= Lin Carter bibliography =

Bibliography of science fiction, fantasy, and nonfiction writer Lin Carter:

== Science fiction ==
=== Tales of the Near Stars ===
- The Star Magicians (1966)
- Tower at the Edge of Time (1968) (Wildside reissue 1999, ISBN 158715093X)
- Tower of the Medusa (1969) (Wildside reissue 2011, ISBN 978-1-4344-3064-9)

=== The History of the Great Imperium ===
- The Man Without a Planet (1966)
- Star Rogue (1970) (Wildside reissue 2008, ISBN 978-1-4344-9805-2 paperback, ISBN 978-1-4344-9806-9 hardcover)
- Outworlder (1971)

=== Hautley Quicksilver ===
- The Thief of Thoth (1968)
- The Purloined Planet (1969)
- "Murder in Space" (1987)

=== The Mysteries of Mars ===
- The Man Who Loved Mars (1973) (Wildside reissue 1999, ISBN 1587150301)
- The Valley Where Time Stood Still (1974) (Wildside reissue 2008, ISBN 978-1-4344-6546-7)
- The City Outside the World (1977) (Wildside reissue 1999, ISBN 1587150670)
- Down to a Sunless Sea (1984) (Wildside reissue 2008, ISBN 978-1-4344-9797-0)

=== Callisto ===
1. Jandar of Callisto (1972)
2. Black Legion of Callisto (1972)
  Callisto Volume 1 (2000 - omnibus including Jandar of Callisto and Black Legion of Callisto)
3. Sky Pirates of Callisto (1973) (Wildside reissue 2008, ISBN 978-1-4344-9803-8 paperback, ISBN 978-1-4344-9804-5 hardcover)
4. Mad Empress of Callisto (1975) (Wildside reissue 2007, ISBN 1434494977)
5. Mind Wizards of Callisto (1975)
6. Lankar of Callisto (1975)
7. Ylana of Callisto (1977)
8. Renegade of Callisto (1978)

=== The Green Star ===
1. Under the Green Star (1972) (Wildside reissue 2002, ISBN 1587156474)
2. When the Green Star Calls (1973) (Wildside reissue 2008, ISBN 978-1-4344-9809-0 trade paperback, ISBN 978-1-4344-9810-6 hardcover)
3. By the Light of the Green Star (DAW Books, 1974) (Wildside reissue 2008, ISBN 978-1-4344-9795-6 paperback, ISBN 978-1-4344-9796-3 hardcover)
4. As the Green Star Rises (1975) (Wildside reissue 2008, ISBN 978-1-4344-6689-1)
5. In the Green Star's Glow (1976) (Wildside reissue 2018, ISBN 978-1-4794-3723-8)

=== Zarkon-Lord of the Unknown ===
1. The Nemesis of Evil (1975) (Wildside reissue 1999, ISBN 1587150573)
2. Invisible Death (1975) (Wildside reissue 1999, ISBN 1587150581)
3. The Volcano Ogre (1976) (Wildside reissue 1999, ISBN 158715059X)
4. The Earth-Shaker (Doubleday, 1982)
5. Horror Wears Blue (Doubleday, 1987)

=== Zanthodon ===
1. Journey to the Underground World (DAW Books, 1979)
2. Zanthodon (DAW Books, 1980)
3. Hurok of the Stone Age (DAW Books, 1981)
4. Darya of the Bronze Age (DAW Books, 1981)
5. Eric of Zanthodon (DAW Books, 1982)
  The Zanthodon MEGAPACK (2014, ISBN 978-1-4794-0450-6) (Wildside omnibus ebook of all five novels)

=== Other novels ===
- Destination: Saturn (1967) (with Donald Wollheim writing as David Grinnell)
- The Flame of Iridar (1967) (Wildside reissue 2018)
- Time War (1974) (Wildside reissue 2018)
- Found Wanting (1985) (Wildside reissue 2008, ISBN 978-1-4344-9799-4 paperback, ISBN 978-1-4344-9800-7 hardcover)

== Fantasy ==
=== Thongor of Valkarth ===
1. Young Thongor, by Lin Carter, Robert M. Price, and Adrian Cole (Wildside Press, 2012) (ISBN 978-1-4344-4101-0)
2. The Wizard of Lemuria (1965; revised/expanded as Thongor and The Wizard of Lemuria (1969)). In his introduction to the revised edition, "A Word from the Author", Carter reveals that the revisions consist of restoring certain passages cut by the editor from the first edition, conforming certain portions of the book to details described in later books of the series, and adding a few thousand words of new material.
3. Thongor of Lemuria (1966; revised/expanded as Thongor and the Dragon City (1970))
4. Thongor Against the Gods (1967)
5. Thongor in the City of Magicians (1968)
6. Thongor at the End of Time (1968)
7. Thongor Fights the Pirates of Tarakus (1970)
8. The Sword of Thongor, by Robert M. Price with some material by Carter (Surinam Turtle Press, 2016)
9. Thongor Conquers the Underground World, by Lin Carter and Robert M. Price (2023)

Note: Carter's literary executor Robert M. Price has written eleven Thongor stories, some based on titles or outlines by Carter, most included in The Sword of Thongor (three also in Young Thongor), and the remaining one in The Mighty Warriors (Ulthar Press, 2018). Three are also available online: "The Creature in the Crypt," "Witch-Queen of Lemuria" and "Mind Lords of Lemuria."

In 1978 an attempt was made to put a Thongor movie in production for release in 1979. It was titled Thongor in the Valley of Demons; however the movie was never produced.

=== Conan ===
- Conan (1967) (with Robert E. Howard and L. Sprague de Camp)
- Conan of the Isles (1968) (with L. Sprague de Camp)
- Conan the Wanderer (1968) (with Robert E. Howard and L. Sprague de Camp) [O/N+ Conan the Adventurer (Howard & de Camp) + Conan the Buccaneer (Carter & de Camp);= The Conan Chronicles 2 (1990)]
- Conan of Cimmeria (1969) (with Robert E. Howard and L. Sprague de Camp) [O/2N+ Conan the Freebooter (Howard & de Camp);= The Conan Chronicles (1989)]
- Conan the Buccaneer (1971) (with L. Sprague de Camp)
- Conan of Aquilonia (1977) (with L. Sprague de Camp)
- Conan the Swordsman (1978) (with L. Sprague de Camp and Björn Nyberg)
- Conan the Liberator (1979) (with L. Sprague de Camp)
- Conan the Barbarian (1982) (with L. Sprague de Camp and Catherine Crook de Camp)
- Sagas of Conan (2004) (with L. Sprague de Camp and Björn Nyberg)

=== The Chronicles of Kylix ===
- The Quest of Kadji (1971) (Wildside reissue 1999, ISBN 1587150867)
- Amalric (unpublished in complete form)
  - "The Higher Heresies of Oolimar" (1973)
  - "The Curious Custom of the Turjan Seraad" (1976)
- The Wizard of Zao (1978)
- Kellory the Warlock (1984) (Wildside reissue 2007, ISBN 978-1-4344-9278-4)

=== Gondwane (World's End) ===
- The Warrior of World's End (1974) (Wildside reissue 2000, ISBN 1587153394)
- The Enchantress of World's End (1975) (Wildside reissue 2000, ISBN 1587153408)
- The Immortal of World's End (1976) (Wildside reissue 2000, ISBN 1587153416)
- The Barbarian of World's End (1977) (Wildside reissue 2000, ISBN 1587153424)
- The Pirate of World's End (1978) (Wildside reissue 2000, ISBN 1587153432)
- Giant of World's End (1969)

=== Terra Magica ===
1. Kesrick (1982) (Wildside reissue 2001, ISBN 1587153130)
2. Dragonrouge (1984) (Wildside reissue 2001, ISBN 1587153149)
3. Mandricardo (1987) (Wildside reissue 2001, ISBN 1587153157)
4. Callipygia (1988) (Wildside reissue 2001, ISBN 1587153165)

=== Tara of the Twilight ===
- Tara of the Twilight (1979)
- "For the Blood is the Life" (1984)
- "The Love of the Sea" (1984)
- "Pale Shadow" (1985)

=== Oz ===
Published posthumously by Tails of the Cowardly Lion and Friends

- The Tired Tailor of Oz (2001)
- The Merry Mountaineer of Oz (collection of four complete Oz novels: The Awful Ogre of Ogodown, High Times on Tip Top Mountain, The Wooden Soldier of Oz, No Joy in Mudville) (2004)

=== "Posthumous collaborations" with Clark Ashton Smith ===
- "The Descent into the Abyss" in Carter's anthology Weird Tales #2. Also in Robert M. Price (ed). The Book of Eibon (Chaosium, 2002). The story is a sort of rewrite of Smith's "The Seven Geases".
- "The Feaster from the Stars". In Crypt of Cthulhu No 26 (Hallowmas 1984). Also in Robert M. Price (ed) The Book of Eibon (Chaosium, 2002). Based on a plot idea by Smith found by Carter in Smith's holograph notes (one not printed in The Black Book of Clark Ashton Smith).
- "The Light from the Pole" in Carter (ed) Weird Tales #1. Also in Robert M. Price (ed) The Book of Eibon (Chaosium, 2002). Based on Smith's Commoriom myth-cycle, utilising an early draft of Smith's "The Coming of the White Worm".
- "The Secret in the Parchment". In Crypt of Cthulhu No 54 (Eastertide 1988). Also in Robert M. Price (ed) The Book of Eibon (Chaosium, 2002). Mingles material derived from Arthur Machen with Smith's Eibonic cyle.
- "The Scroll of Morloc". Fantastic (Oct 1975). Also in Carter's anthologies Year's Best Fantasy Stories No 2 (DAW 1976), pp. 143–157; and Lost Worlds, pp. 11–17. Also in Robert M. Price (ed) The Book of Eibon (Chaosium, 2002).
- "The Stairs in the Crypt". Fantastic 25, No 4 (Aug 1976), pp. 82–89. Also in Carter's anthologies Year's Best Fantasy Stories No 3 (DAW, 1977), pp. 129–40; and Lost Worlds, pp. 18–26and in Robert M. Price (ed) The Book of Eibon (Chaosium, 2002).The title comes from one of the stories said to have been written by Robert Blake in Lovecraft's "The Haunter of the Dark". Carter also pays tribute to such Cthulhu Mythos stories as Henry Kuttner's "The Salem Horror" and E. Hoffmann Price's collaboration with Lovecraft, "Through the Gates of the Silver Key".
- "The Utmost Abomination" Weird Tales Autumn or Fall 1973; also in Mike Ashley (ed), Weird Legacies, pp. 81–91 and in Robert M. Price (ed) The Book of Eibon (Chaosium, 2002).
- "The Vengeance of Yig" in Carter's anthology Weird Tales #4, pp. 275ff.
- "The Winfield Inheritance" in Carter's anthology Weird Tales No 3, pp. 275–311.
- "Zoth-Ommog" in Edward Berglund (ed) The Disciples of Cthulhu Cthulhu Mythos anthology, pp. 141–193. Note: a sequel to this tale has been written by Leigh Blackmore (see Xothic legend cycle).

==== Pastiches of H. P. Lovecraft ====
- "Acolyte of the Flame". In Crypt of Cthulhu No 36 (Yuletide, 1985). Reprint in The Book of Eibon (Chaosium, 2002), edited by Robert M. Price. The latter notes that both the Crypt and Chaosium versions are the "later" version of the story, and that an earlier version exists.
- " The Burrowers Beneath". In Cthulhu Cultus No 6 (1997) Title taken from one of the stories said to have been written by Robert Blake in Lovecraft's The Haunter of the Dark. Not to be confused with Brian Lumley's novel The Burrowers Beneath (see Chthonian (Cthulhu Mythos)) nor with the Robert Price story in Price's anthology The Book of Eibon (Chaosium, 2002).
- "The City of Pillars". First published in Carter's own magazine Kadath (1974). To be reprinted in Crypt of Cthulhu. Purportedly a translation from The Necronomicon.
- "The Descent into the Abyss". In Carter's anthology Weird Tales #2. Also in The Book of Eibon (Chaosium, 2002), edited by Robert M. Price.
- "The Doom of Yakthoob". In The Arkham Collector No 10 (Summer 1971). Purportedly a translation from The Necronomicon.
- "The Double Tower" in Year's Best Fantasy Stories #1 (DAW Books, 1975). Also in The Book of Eibon (Chaosium, 2002), edited by Robert M. Price.
- "Dreams in the House of Weir". In Carter (ed), Weird Tales #4.
- "In the Vale of Pnath" in Gerald Page (ed) Nameless Places. (This story takes its title from Lovecraft, and some of its content from Lovecraft's Dreamlands series, while also featuring CA Smith's Book of Eibon.
- "The Offering" in Crypt of Cthulhu 1, No 7 (Lammas 1982). Based primarily on "Out of the Aeons" and "Bothon" (a story collaboration between H.P. Lovecraft and Henry S. Whitehead).
- "Shaggai". In Dark Things, edited by August Derleth. The title is taken from one of the stories said to have been written by Robert Blake in Lovecraft's "The Haunter of the Dark". Purportedly a chapter from the Book of Eibon.
- "Something in the Moonlight" in Weird Tales #1, edited by Carter himself.
- "The Stone from Mnar: A Fragment from the Necronomicon".Appeared in "Crypt of Cthulhu" #36 and reprinted as purportedly, part of the first 5 sections of the Necronomicon, in Crypt of Cthulhu #70
- "The Thing Under Memphis". In Crypt of Cthulhu 3, No - (WN 22)(Roodmas 1984), 3-5.
- "Them From Outside". In "Crypt of Cthulhu" #23 as "Concerning Them from Outside" and reprinted in Crypt of Cthulhu #70 as purportedly, part of the first 5 sections of the Necronomicon.
- "The Thing in the Pit". In Carter's Lost Worlds. (Purportedly a translation from the Zanthu Tablets).

See also Xothic legend cycle. For further info see Robert M. Price "The Statement of Lin Carter", Crypt of Cthulhu 1, No 2 (Yuletide 1981), 11-19.

==== Pastiches of Lord Dunsany ====
===== Ikranos dreamlands cycle =====
- "The Poet" in The Gorgon, v. 2, no. 4, November 1948.
- "The Kings of Yu-Istam" in Scientifantasy, v. 1, no. 3, Spring 1949.
- "The Castle beyond the World" in The Fanscient, no. 10, Winter 1950.
- "King of the Golden City" in Nekromantikon, v. 1, no. 4, Winter 1950/51.
- "The Quest of Glorian the Troubadour" (unpublished).
- "The Castle in the Clouds" (unpublished).
- "Crysarion of Ith" (unpublished).
- "The Gate of Dreams" (unpublished).
- "The Crystal Key" (unpublished).
- "The Gods of Neol-Shendis" in Amra, v. 2, no. 41, July 1966 (later revised as the leadoff Simrana Cycle tale "The Gods of Niom Parma").
- "Shanizar of the Sea" (unpublished).
- "Shanizar and the City of Glass" (unpublished).
- "Aviathar and the Sword of Swords" (unpublished).

==== Simrana dreamlands cycle ====
- "The Gods of Niom Parma" in Warlocks and Warriors (1970) (revised from the Ikranos tale "The Gods of Neol-Shendis").
- "The Whelming of Oom" in The Young Magicians (1969).
- "Zingazar" in New Worlds for Old (1971).
- "How Sargoth Lay Siege to Zaremm" in Swordsmen and Supermen (1972).
- "The Laughter of Han" in Fantasy Tales, v. 5, no. 9, Spring 1982.
- "The Benevolence of Yib" in Crypt of Cthulhu, no. 51, Hallowmas 1987.
- "How Ghuth Would Have Hunted the Silth" in Crypt of Cthulhu, no. 54, 1988.
- "The Thievery of Yish" in Fantasy Tales, v. 10, no. 1, Autumn 1988.
- "How Doom Came Down at Last on Adrazoon" in Crypt of Cthulhu, no. 57, 1988.
- [Untitled] (complete draft)
- "How Shand Became King of Thieves" (unfinished draft)
- "Dzimadazoul" (unfinished draft)

=== Other novels ===
- Lost World of Time (1969) (Wildside reissue 2008, ISBN 978-1-4344-9801-4 paperback, ISBN 978-1-4344-9802-1 hardcover)
- The Black Star (1973) (Wildside reissue 1999, ISBN 1587150956)

=== Collections ===
- King Kull (1967) (Robert E. Howard)
- Beyond the Gates of Dream (Nordon Publications/Leisure Books, 1969) ISBN 978-0-8439-0519-9 (Wildside reissue 1999, ISBN 1587150786)
- Lost Worlds (DAW Books, 1980) (Wildside reissue 2008, ISBN 978-1-4344-6784-3 trade paperback, ISBN 978-1-4344-6785-0 hardcover)
- The Xothic Legend Cycle: The Complete Mythos Fiction of Lin Carter (Chaosium, 1997)
- Lin Carter's Anton Zarnak, Supernatural Sleuth. Edited by and with intro "The Many Incarnations of Anton Zarnak" by Robert M. Price. (Marietta Publishing, 2000). Collects Carter's three stories of this occult detective character together with stories of Zarnak by other authors including Price, Joseph S. Pulver, Pierre Comtois, C.J. Henderson, John L. French and James Chambers.
- Lin Carter's Simrana Cycle. Edited by Robert M. Price. (Celaeno Press, 2018)

== Poetry ==
- Sandalwood and Jade: Poems of the Exotic and the Strange (St Petersburg, FL:Sign of the Centaur Press, 1951; 100 signed copies).
- Galleon of Dream: Poems of Fantasy and Wonder (St Petersburg, FL: Sign of the Centaur Press, 1953; 200 signed copies)
- A Letter to Judith (New York, 1959; 500 copies).
- Dreams from R'lyeh (Arkham, 1975). Originally announced as Poems. Note: The Sonnet sequence "Dreams from R'lyeh" from this volume has been reprinted in The Xothic Legend Cycle: The Complete Mythos Fiction of Lin Carter

== Hobby games ==
- Royal Armies of the Hyborian Age: A Wargamers' Guide to the Age of Conan (with Scott Bizar). Fantasy Games Unlimited, 1975. Illustrated by Roy Krenkel.
- Flash Gordon & the Warriors of Mongo (with Scott Bizar). Fantasy Games Unlimited, 1977. Illustrated by Alex Raymond.

== Non-fiction ==
- Tolkien: A Look Behind "The Lord of the Rings" (1969) (Ballantine) (Wildside reissue 2008, ISBN 978-1-4344-9807-6 paperback, ISBN 978-1-4344-9808-3 hardcover)
- Lovecraft: A Look Behind the Cthulhu Mythos (1972) (Ballantine)
- Imaginary Worlds: the Art of Fantasy (1973) (Ballantine Adult Fantasy)
- Middle Earth: The World of Tolkien Illustrated (text by Carter, paintings by David Wenzel, 1977)
- "H. P. Lovecraft: The Gods" in August Derleth ed. The Shuttered Room and Other Pieces (1959) (Arkham House)

== Anthologies edited ==
=== Ballantine Adult Fantasy series ===
"Ballantine Adult Fantasy" was inaugurated in April 1969, in words on the front cover of The Mezentian Gate by E. R. Eddison, and in May, with the logo on The Blue Star by Fletcher Pratt, cataloged as #1. Some later volumes also carried the unicorn's head Adult Fantasy logo without numerical assignment to the series.

- Dragons, Elves, and Heroes (1969)
- The Young Magicians (1969)
- Golden Cities, Far (1970)
- New Worlds for Old (1971)
- The Spawn of Cthulhu (1971) French ed. as Les Adorateurs de Cthulhu, Champs-Élysées (Masque fantastique 12), 1979.
- Double Phoenix (1971)
- Discoveries in Fantasy (1972) (Wildside reissue 2008, ISBN 978-1-4344-6549-8)
- Great Short Novels of Adult Fantasy I (1972)
- Great Short Novels of Adult Fantasy Volume II (1972) (Wildside reissue 2008, ISBN 978-1-4344-6636-5)

=== Flashing Swords! ===
- Flashing Swords! #1 (1973)
- Flashing Swords! #2 (1973)
- Flashing Swords! #3: Warriors and Wizards (1976)
- Flashing Swords! #4: Barbarians and Black Magicians (1977)
- Flashing Swords! #5: Demons and Daggers (1977). Dell Books, 191 ISBN 0-440-12590-1

=== Weird Tales ===
- Weird Tales #1 (Zebra Books, 1981)
- Weird Tales #2 (Zebra Books, 1981)
- Weird Tales #3 (Zebra Books, 1981)
- Weird Tales #4 (Zebra Books, 1983)

=== The Year's Best Fantasy Stories ===
- The Year's Best Fantasy Stories (DAW Books, 1975)
- The Year's Best Fantasy Stories: 2 (DAW Books, 1976)
- The Year's Best Fantasy Stories: 3 (DAW Books, 1977)
- The Year's Best Fantasy Stories: 4 (DAW Books, 1978)
- The Year's Best Fantasy Stories: 5 (DAW Books, 1980)
- The Year's Best Fantasy Stories: 6 (DAW Books, 1980)

=== Other anthologies ===
- The Magic of Atlantis (1970)
- Kingdoms of Sorcery (1976)
- Realms of Wizardry (1976)
