= The Warrior of World's End =

1974 novel by Lin Carter

- Cover of the first edition.
- Author: Lin Carter
- Cover artist: Vincent Di Fate
- Language: English
- Series: Gondwane Epic
- Genre: Fantasy
- Publisher: DAW Books
- Publication date: November 1974
- Publication place: United States
- Media type: Print (Paperback)
- Pages: 160
- OCLC: 2129311
- Followed by: The Enchantress of World's End

The Warrior of World's End is a 1974 fantasy novel by American writer Lin Carter, set on a decadent far-future Earth in which all the world's land masses have supposedly drifted back together to form a last supercontinent called Gondwane. The book is chronologically the first in Carter's Gondwane Epic (the culminating novel Giant of World's End having been issued earlier). It was first published in paperback by DAW Books, then reprinted twice through November 1978. A trade paperback edition was published by Wildside Press in January 2001. The book includes a map by the author of the portion of Gondwane in which its story is set.

== Plot summary ==
Gondwane is a crazy-quilt of human and non-human societies divided into "kingdoms, empires, city-states, federations, theocracies, tyrannies, conglomerates, unions, principates and various degenerate savage ... hordes," all built atop the detritus of seven hundred million years of previous civilizations. Over this span "the laws of physics themselves have become peculiar and inconsistent," and science has been largely superseded by magic. The moon of this far-future world appears gigantic, as it is in a slowly decaying orbit that threatens the planet with ultimate destruction. In consequence, the very time period in which the series is set is called "The Eon of the Falling Moon," and the next, future eon will be "the Eon of the Silver Phoenix" and is projected to be mankind's last. In 70 years, the moon will fall, but in some unexpected way.

Phlesco, a "Godmaker," and his pseudowoman spouse Iminix are traveling to the Realm of the Nine Hegemons when they come across the novel's protagonist Ganelon Silvermane, handsome, muscular, and apparently mindless, wandering in the rain. Taking pity on him, the couple takes him in and conveys him to the city of Zermish. There two magicians, the haruspex Slunth and Narelon the Illusionist, diagnose his condition. They discover, contradictorily, that when found he was simultaneously seven hours old and two-hundred million years of age. It turns out that Ganelon is a Construct made by long-extinct Time Gods, who had foreseen a succession of great world crises and created heroes to deal with them. Each is preserved in the Ardelix Time Vault until awakened by the onset of the crisis it is intended he resolve.

Unfortunately Ganelon is ignorant of the nature of his particular crisis, having been woken prematurely by an earthquake. His heroic character soon becomes apparent, however, when he saves Zermish from an invading horde of Indigons. His triumph attracts the malevolent interest of the Queen of Red Magic, prompting Narelon to whisk Ganelon off to his fortress in the Crystal Mountains. From there they flee on a giant bronze robotic Bazonga bird. In their voyage they encounter the Sirix Xarda of Jemmerdy, the slavers of the Air Mines, and the dreaded Airmasters of Sky Island, wielders of a superweapon called the Death Zone (a directable vacuum bubble). The Airmasters are defeated in a climactic battle on Sky Island. A worthy achievement to be sure, but not, it is suspected, the one for which Ganelon is intended. The wanderings will continue.

== Sources ==
Robert M. Price, Carter's literary executor, wrote that "[t]he "World's End" books are compounded of about equal parts of A. E. van Vogt's The Book of Ptath, Jack Vance's The Dying Earth, Clark Ashton Smith's "Zothique" tales, and Carter's own Tower of the Medusa ... with a little Oz thrown in for extra silliness.

Reviewer Andrew Darlington also detected such influences, specifically Smith's "Zothique" and Vance's "Dying Earth," with hints of John Brunner’s Catch a Falling Star and Michael Moorcock’s The Dancers at the End of Time.

== Reception ==
Robert Price formed the opinion that the Gondwane novels were "no good." He writes "They suffer form the same malady that afflicted Amalric (and which ... blaze into fever in The Wizard of Zao and the "Terra Magica" series); the lame and self-consciously cute attempts at humor ... only succeed in hampering and tripping up novels that are straining at their halters to become straight, robust Carter Sword & Sorcery yarns." The "series contain[s] the stuff of vintage Carter fantasy epics, but the books suffer ... from an omnipresent patina of frivolity that continually undermines the reader's suspension of disbelief, and ... from a queer distancing of the narration." He notes that "[o]n the whole, the Gondwane books manifest strangely lax and undisciplined writing ... commit[ting] conceptual and continuity blunders and ... rationalizing the difficulty .. in a contrived manner ... Some gaffes he never seems to notice."

Andrew Darlington characterizes Carter as a "curious writer," a "fan" who "arguably never evolved far beyond that status" and calls the Gondwane books "of variable quality" though "all relatively short and effortlessly readable." Still, in contrast to Price, he finds the series "different, by degrees" from the mass of Carter's works aping the styles or settings of earlier authors, while noting that The Warrior of World’s End "still colonises worlds conjured into being by other writers," Darlington feels the "Gondwane mythos might just be his most original creation." He praises the "wonderfully idiosyncratic adventures" and "thread of playful humour" in Carter's novel, "one entirely in character with the whimsical and fin de siècle capriciousness of the age he’s conjectured." He concludes by rating the book as "among [Carter's] very best."

Gary Gygax lists Lin Carter's World's End series as a possible source of inspiration for players of Dungeons & Dragons in the first edition Dungeon Master's Guide.
