= The Purloined Planet =

1969 novel by Lin Carter

- Cover from first publication, in The; Evil That Men Do/The Purloined Planet
- Author: Lin Carter
- Language: English
- Genre: Science fiction
- Publisher: Belmont Books
- Publication date: 1969
- Publication place: United States
- Media type: Print (paperback)
- Pages: 173
- OCLC: 4429957
- Preceded by: The Thief of Thoth

The Purloined Planet is a science fiction novella by American writer Lin Carter, the second in his Hautley Quicksilver series. It was first published in paperback by Belmont Books in May 1969 together with the unrelated John Brunner novella The Evil That Men Do as the "Belmont Double" anthology, The Evil That Man Do/The Purloined Planet. It was reprinted by Belmont Tower and by Flamingo Books (as the first British edition) in March 1975, The first stand-alone edition was issued as an ebook by Gateway/Orion in December 2019.

== Plot summary ==
Hautley Quicksilver is a legally licensed master thief characterized as "a futuristic James Bond/Simon Templar/Sherlock Holmes, ... suave and debonair, [but] conceited and pompous."

Quicksliver is called to deal with a mysterious crime on the planet Albazar I, a place where crime should be unknown; the inhabitants have neither wealth nor strong passions, lacking therefore anything to steal or any inclination to violence. Only on arrival does he learn the scope of the problem—the entire planet is missing, apparently stolen!

== Relation to other works ==
Hautley Quicksilver appears in one additional Carter work, a science fiction locked-room mystery short story titled "Murder in Space," in Astro-Adventures: Tales of Scientifiction no. 1, January 1987. It "lacked the humorous approach of the original novellas."

According to Robert M. Price, Quicksilver "seems to function within the Galactic Imperium, so these two novellas [The Thief of Thoth and The Purloined Planet] might be considered an adjunct to the Imperium books" (The Man Without a Planet (1966), Star Rogue (1970), and Outworlder (1971).

== Reception ==
Robert M. Price writes that the Hautley Quicksilver books "read like science fiction satire and are genuinely funny, yet they hold reader interest like the action-mysteries they seem to spoof."

The book was also reviewed by Hank Davis in Science Fiction Review, February 1970, and David Pasko in Luna Monthly #9, February 1970, and The Science Fiction Review (Monthly), June 1975.
