= Down to a Sunless Sea =

Down to a Sunless Sea may refer to:

- Down to a Sunless Sea (Graham novel), a 1979 novel by David Graham
- Down to a Sunless Sea (Carter novel), a 1984 novel by Lin Carter
