= Tower at the Edge of Time =

1968 novel by Lin Carter

- Cover from first edition
- Author: Lin Carter
- Language: English
- Series: Tales of the Near Stars
- Genre: Science fiction
- Publisher: Belmont Books
- Publication date: 1968
- Publication place: United States
- Media type: Print (paperback)
- Pages: 141
- OCLC: 3075831
- Preceded by: The Star Magicians
- Followed by: Tower of the Medusa

Tower at the Edge of Time is a science fiction novel by American writer Lin Carter, the second in his Tales of the Near Stars series. It was first published in paperback by Belmont Books in January 1968, with reprints from Tower Books in 1969, its successor Belmont Tower in 1972 and 1977, and Leisure Books in 1982. An ebook edition was issued by Gateway/Orion in May 2020. The book has been translated into German and Italian.

== Plot summary ==
Three villains, an evil ruler, a warrior, and a monk from Yoth-Vembis, seek the Treasure of Time, which lies behind a dimensional gateway in the Temple City of the Dark World of the Time Priests. To unlock the gateway they kidnap Thane, an educated barbarian swordsman who unknowingly hosts an ancient divine force. The party is then projected across the universe to face judgment before a godlike entity which destroys the villains while preserving Thane and his beloved.

== Relation to other works ==
The Tales of the Near Stars series comprises this novel plus The Star Magicians (1966) and Tower of the Medusa (1969), all of which take place after the fall of in the wake of the interstellar Carina Empire. Its collapse has left the civilization of the surviving planets in ruins, with some isolated and others reduced to barbarism. Their cultural diversity has produced an odd mix of advanced technology and seeming sorcery amid the inhabited worlds. Similarities in situation to Carter's History of the Great Imperium series have led critic John Clute to link the other two Near Stars novels to that sequence, though the Imperium books are usually considered to consist solely of three other novels, The Man Without a Planet (1966), Star Rogue (1970), and Outworlder (1971)

== Reception ==
Robert M. Price calls Tower at the Edge of Time "an entertaining and hearty adventure yarn, classic Carter [which] should be read and enjoyed on its own terms; [cautioning] I would not advise reading it on the heels of The Star Magicians, the plot of which it shares in virtually every detail."
