= Belmont Double novels =

Science fiction series

Belmont Doubles are a series of science fiction books published by Belmont Books between 1967 and 1969, mostly in tête-bêche format. A few of the Belmont Double titles were reprinted, and in one instance remixed, by Belmont's successor Belmont Tower in the early 1970s. The series was inspired by the Ace Doubles, published between 1952 and 1973.

== List of Belmont Double titles ==
This list is complete and includes the catalog numbers used by the publisher.

| # | First book | Second book | Publication date | Cat. no. |
|---|---|---|---|---|
| 1 | Lin Carter; The Flame of Iridar | Kris Neville; Peril of the Starmen | May 1967 | B50-759 |
| 2 | Harlan Ellison; Doomsman | Lee Hoffman; Telepower | August 1967 | B50-779 |
| 3 | Kris Neville; Special Delivery | Dave Van Arnam; Star Gladiator | October 1967 | B50-788 |
| 4 | Lin Carter; The Thief of Thoth | Frank Belknap Long... And Others Shall Be Born | January 1968 | B50-809 |
| 5 | William Tenn; A Lamp for Medusa | Dave Van Arnam; The Players of Hell | June 1968 | B60-077 |
| 6 | Robert Bloch; Ladies' Day | Robert Bloch; This Crowded Earth | August 1968 | B60-080 |
| 7 | John Brunner; Father of Lies | Bruce Duncan; Mirror Image | October 1968 | B60-081 |
| 8 | John Brunner; The Evil That Men Do | Lin Carter; The Purloined Planet | May 1969 | B60-1010 |

== List of Belmont Tower Double titles ==
This list may not be complete. It includes the catalog numbers used by the publisher.

| # | First book | Second book | Publication date | Cat. no. |
|---|---|---|---|---|
| 1 | Harlan Ellison; Doomsman | Lin Carter; The Thief of Thoth | July 1972 | 50244 |
| 2 | Robert Bloch; Ladies' Day | Robert Bloch; This Crowded Earth | December 1974 | 50759 |
| 3 | John Brunner; The Evil That Men Do | Lin Carter; The Purloined Planet | March 1975 | 50787 |
