= The Barbarian of World's End =

Fantasy fiction book

- Cover of the first edition.
- Author: Lin Carter
- Illustrator: Jack Gaughan
- Cover artist: John Bierley
- Language: English
- Series: Gondwane Epic
- Genre: Fantasy
- Publisher: DAW Books
- Publication date: 1977
- Publication place: United States
- Media type: Print (Paperback)
- Pages: 188
- ISBN: 0-87997-300-5
- OCLC: 3068737
- Preceded by: The Immortal of World's End
- Followed by: The Pirate of World's End

The Barbarian of World's End is a fantasy by American writer Lin Carter, set on a decadent far-future Earth in which all the world's landmasses have supposedly drifted back together to form a last supercontinent called Gondwane. The book is chronologically the fourth in Carter's Gondwane Epic (the culminating novel Giant of World's End having been issued earlier). It was first published in paperback by DAW Books in May 1977. A trade paperback edition was published by Wildside Press in January 2001 and an ebook edition by Thunderchild Publishing in May 2019. The book includes a map of the portion of Gondwane in which its story is set and "A Glossary of Places Mentioned in the Text" by the author.

== Plot summary ==
Ganelon Silvermane offers himself as hostage to the barbarian Ximchak Horde, the worst band of barbarians to roam the plains. From a captive of the Horde, he rises to heights of heroism greater than ever before, becoming its leader and beginning to assume the full power of his mighty being. He takes his followers beyond the glass-walled Triple City to the Marvellous Mountains carved into gigantic friezes.

== Sources ==
Robert M. Price, Carter's literary executor, wrote that "[t]he "World's End" books are compounded of about equal parts of A. E. van Vogt's The Book of Ptath, Jack Vance's The Dying Earth, Clark Ashton Smith's "Zothique" tales, and Carter's own Tower of the Medusa ... with a little Oz thrown in for extra silliness.

Reviewer Andrew Darlington also detected such influences, specifically Smith's "Zothique" and Vance's "Dying Earth," with hints of John Brunner’s Catch a Falling Star and Michael Moorcock’s The Dancers at the End of Time).

== Reception ==
Robert Price formed the opinion that the Gondwane novels were "no good." He writes "They suffer form the same malady that afflicted Amalric (and which ... blaze into fever in The Wizard of Zao and the "Terra Magica" series); the lame and self-consciously cute attempts at humor ... only succeed in hampering and tripping up novels that are straining at their halters to become straight, robust Carter Sword & Sorcery yarns. Giant and Barbarian almost manage it, but not quite."" The "series contain[s] the stuff of vintage Carter fantasy epics, but the books suffer ... from an omnipresent patina of frivolity that continually undermines the reader's suspension of disbelief, and ... from a queer distancing of the narration." He notes that "[o]n the whole, the Gondwane books manifest strangely lax and undisciplined writing ... commit[ting] conceptual and continuity blunders and ... rationalizing the difficulty .. in a contrived manner ... Some gaffes he never seems to notice."

Andrew Darlington characterizes Carter as a "curious writer," a "fan" who "arguably never evolved far beyond that status" and calls the Gondwane books "of variable quality" though "all relatively short and effortlessly readable." Still, in contrast to Price, he finds the series "different, by degrees" from the mass of Carter's works aping the styles or settings of earlier authors, and feels the "Gondwane mythos might just be his most original creation."

Gary Gygax lists Lin Carter's World's End series as a possible source of inspiration for players of Dungeons & Dragons in the first edition Dungeon Master's Guide.
