= The Thief of Thoth =

1968 novel by Lin Carter

- Cover from first publication, in The; Thief of Thoth/... And Others Shall Be Born
- Author: Lin Carter
- Cover artist: Jerome Podwil
- Language: English
- Genre: Science fiction
- Publisher: Belmont Books
- Publication date: 1968
- Publication place: United States
- Media type: Print (paperback)
- Pages: 172
- OCLC: 1812301
- Followed by: The Purloined Planet

The Thief of Thoth is a science fiction novella by American writer Lin Carter, the first in his Hautley Quicksilver series. It was first published in paperback by Belmont Books in January 1968 together with the unrelated Frank Belknap Long novella ... And Others Shall Be Born as the "Belmont Double" anthology, The Thief of Thoth/... And Others Shall Be Born. It was reprinted by Belmont Tower in March 1975 together with the unrelated Harlan Ellison novella Doomsman as the "Belmont Double" anthology, Doomsman/The Thief of Thoth. It also appeared in the Wildside Press ebook anthology The Science Fiction Crime Megapack in April 2017. The first stand-alone edition was issued as an ebook by Gateway/Orion in May 2020. The work has been translated into Norwegian.

== Plot summary ==
Hautley Quicksilver is a legally licensed master thief characterized as "a futuristic James Bond/Simon Templar/Sherlock Holmes, ... suave and debonair, [but] conceited and pompous."

Wealthy from hazardous and often criminal commissions, Quicksilver owns a castle home on his own private planetoid. Yet he still accepts clients, such as the three who separately approach him to steal the jeweled crown of the long dead reptile people of the planet Thoth, a crown now possessed and guarded in an underground labyrinth by cultist members of Thoth's current human population. Intrigued, Quicksilver sets out on a long and involved quest, visiting the Thieves' Planet to consult the one man to have survived an encounter with the cultists, then the backwater planet Earth, and finally Thoth itself. He ultimately discovers that the crown everyone seeks contains the secrets for weaponry that can dominate the universe, a threat best forestalled by leaving it to the cultists.

== Relation to other works ==
According to Robert M. Price, Quicksilver "seems to function within the Galactic Imperium, so these two novellas [The Thief of Thoth and The Purloined Planet] might be considered an adjunct to the Imperium books" (The Man Without a Planet (1966), Star Rogue (1970), and Outworlder (1971).

== Reception ==
Robert M. Price writes that the Hautley Quicksilver books "read like science fiction satire and are genuinely funny, yet they hold reader interest like the action-mysteries they seem to spoof."
