= The City Outside the World =

1977 novel by Lin Carter

- Cover of first edition
- Author: Lin Carter
- Cover artist: Ken Barr
- Language: English
- Series: The Mysteries of Mars
- Genre: Science fantasy
- Publisher: Berkley Medallion
- Publication date: 1977
- Publication place: United States
- Media type: Print (paperback)
- Pages: viii, 215
- ISBN: 0-425-03549-2
- OCLC: 962099295
- LC Class: PS3553.A7823 C58 1977
- Preceded by: The Valley Where Time Stood Still
- Followed by: Down to a Sunless Sea

The City Outside the World is a science fantasy novel by American writer Lin Carter, the third in his Edgar Rice Burroughs- and Leigh Brackett-inspired series The Mysteries of Mars. It was first published in paperback by Berkley Medallion in October 1977 and in reissued in trade paperback by Wildside Press in December 1999. The first hardcover edition was published by Wildside Press in February 2011.

== Plot summary ==
Mars, a world with a culture ages older than that of Earth, is a dying world, and has been in decline for eons. By the twenty-second century it has become a colony of the younger civilization of Earth, its natives oppressed by the rapacious Colonial Authority.

In Yeolarn, a city divided into Terran and Martian sectors, the Terran Ryker is on the lam from the CA and natives alike. He finds himself attracted to the native dancer Valarda, by whom he is enticed into a local slum. They fall afoul of a mob, who treat Valarda as a hated pariah; Ryker helps her elude them, and with the native boy Kiki they join a caravan departing for the northern desert to further shake their pursuers.

Later Valarda and Kiki disappear, along with an antique amulet in Ryker's possession. He trails the thieves to the ruins of Khuu and the Martian "sphinx", an ancient monument in the form of the insect-like Pteraton; Valarda's enemies also follow. The amulet proves the key to the structure, unlocking a time portal into a prehistoric era. Ryker, Valarda and Kiki are hurled into this past together with their hunters and the captive Terran scientist Herzog.

Beyond the portal is Zhiam, the original city whose ruins would one day become Khuu. It is the last refuge of the legendary lost tenth tribe of Mars, Valarda and Kiki's people. Branded devil-worshipping heretics by the nine other nations, it was almost exterminated in the Zhaggua Jihad in ages past. Valarda, the lost tribe's high priestess and last of its rulers, had ventured back into the world to retrieve the key that could betray their hiding place, only to be found out. Now that outsiders have breached the tribe's peaceful retreat, the age-old conflict breaks out anew.

The situation is resolved when the lost tribe's "devil" deity, a benevolent energy being called Zhagguaziu, the Child-of-Stars, intervenes to defeat and expel the intruders. To safeguard its worshippers it seals off the gateway between the prehistoric refuge and modern Mars permanently. It gives its blessing to Ryker and Valarda's mutual passion and instructs them to establish a new dynasty. The implication is that all the modern Martians will be their descendants.

== Chronology ==
This story was the fourth published in the series, after "The Martian El Dorado of Parker Whitley," but in terms of events it comes third, following The Valley Where Time Stood Still. In both instances, it is followed by Down to a Sunless Sea.

== Reception ==
Den Valdron, assessing the series in ERBzine, rates the book together with The Valley Where Time Stood Still as "stand[ing] between" The Man Who Loved Mars and Down to a Sunless Sea, which he considers the best and least interesting of the series, "but each has their [sic] particular strengths." Over all, he feels "[t]here’s something a little extra in his Martian novels that puts them at the upper registers of Carter’s work," and "commend[s] them to the reader."

J. G. Huckenpohler, also writing in ERBzine, rated the series "among my favorites" of Carter's stories, "show[ing] more originality" than Carter's Zanthodon and Callisto books. Nonetheless, he "found them to be uneven," growing "increasingly repetitious, the last two [including "City"] especially." It shares what he identifies as the sequence's standard plot: "[a] Terran outlaw, an older Dok-i-tar, a Martian sidekick, originally an enemy, and a Martian girl find a lost city known only to the oldest legends of the Martians, unlock its secrets, and either remain as its rulers or escape to begin a new life."
