= The Valley Where Time Stood Still =

1974 novel by Lin Carter

- Cover of first edition
- Author: Lin Carter
- Cover artist: John Cayea
- Language: English
- Series: The Mysteries of Mars
- Genre: Science fantasy
- Publisher: Doubleday
- Publication date: 1974
- Publication place: United States
- Media type: Print (Hardcover)
- Pages: 179
- ISBN: 0-385-04232-9
- OCLC: 00994730
- Dewey Decimal: 813.54
- LC Class: PS3553.A7823
- Preceded by: The Martian El Dorado of Parker Whitley
- Followed by: The City Outside the World

The Valley Where Time Stood Still is a science fantasy novel by American writer Lin Carter, the second in his Edgar Rice Burroughs- and Leigh Brackett-inspired series The Mysteries of Mars. It was first published in hardcover by Doubleday in December 1974 and in paperback by Popular Library in February 1976. It was reissued by Wildside Press in April 2008.

== Plot summary ==
Mars, a world with a culture ages older than that of Earth, is a dying world, and has been in decline for eons. By the twenty-second century it had become a colony of the younger civilization of Earth, its natives oppressed by the rapacious Colonial Authority.

Encountering each other in the Martian wastes, Terran outcast McCord and Martian warrior Thaklar engage in a wary truce and partnership for the sake of survival. Afterwards they are taken captive by the bandit chief Chastar and pressed into service of an expedition he has taken over. His other captives, the brother-and-sister Swedish archeological team of Karl and Inga Nordgen, have been searching for the legendary valley of Ophar, land of eternal youth, where life on Mars supposedly began; Chastar hopes to gain its treasures for himself.

The party ultimately finds the valley, a prehistoric paradise whose true nature is masked by a protective illusion. There the group fragments, each member falling victim to the valley's uncanny and seemingly judgmental power, a radiation that alters all who enter it in accord with their inner natures. McCord and Thaklar are relatively unchanged, while the victimized Inga and hard-bitten Zerild, a renegade dancer allied with the bandits, recover their innocence. The evil Chastar and abusive Karl, however, are regressed into monsters.

Freed from their captors, the Terran and Martian protagonists leave the valley and go their separate ways, McCord paired with Inga and Thaklar with Zerild.

== Chronology ==
In both publication and chronological order, this is the second story in the series; it was published between The Man Who Loved Mars and "The Martian El Dorado of Parker Whitley," but in terms of events it follows the latter and precedes The City Outside the World.

== Reception ==
H. W. Hall in Library Journal writes "[t]he road to the valley is an adventurous one, and the 'Valley Where Life Was Born' holds its own adventures and secrets. A satisfying, enjoyable fantasy."

Den Valdron, assessing the series in ERBzine, rates the book together with The City Outside the World as "stand[ing] between" The Man Who Loved Mars and Down to a Sunless Sea, which he considers the best and least interesting of the series, "but each has their [sic] particular strengths." Over all, he feels "[t]here's something a little extra in his Martian novels that puts them at the upper registers of Carter's work," and "commend[s] them to the reader."

J. G. Huckenpohler, also writing in ERBzine, rated the series "among my favorites" of Carter's stories, "show[ing] more originality" than Carter's Zanthodon and Callisto books. Nonetheless, he "found them to be uneven," growing "increasingly repetitious, the last two especially." While Valley escapes Huckenpohler's damnation of the later books, it shares what he identifies as the sequence's standard plot: "[a] Terran outlaw, an older Dok-i-tar, a Martian sidekick, originally an enemy, and a Martian girl find a lost city known only to the oldest legends of the Martians, unlock its secrets, and either remain as its rulers or escape to begin a new life."

The novel was also reviewed by Frederick Patten in Delap's F & SF Review, June 1976.
