= Found Wanting =

1985 novel by Lin Carter

- Cover from first edition
- Author: Lin Carter
- Cover artist: Tim Jacobus
- Language: English
- Genre: Science fiction
- Publisher: DAW Books
- Publication date: 1985
- Publication place: United States
- Media type: Print (paperback)
- Pages: 220
- ISBN: 0-88677-050-5
- OCLC: 12176261
- Dewey Decimal: 813.54
- LC Class: PS3553.A7823

Found Wanting is a science fiction novel by American writer Lin Carter. It was first published in paperback by DAW Books in June 1985, and reissued in hardcover and trade paperback by Wildside Press in February 2008. An ebook edition was issued by Gateway/Orion in March 2020.

== Plot summary ==
Kyon, an amnesiac gardener, wanders through the future domed city of Urbs in search of identity and purpose, experiencing it and its androgynous, pre-pubescent inhabitants as a series of wonders and terrors. Ultimately, Urbs is revealed as the last refuge of humanity on an environmentally devastated Earth, curated and maintained in a sort of stasis by benevolent reptilian aliens until the planet has been made habitable again. In a replay of the Garden of Eden story, Kyon and another of the inhabitants have been tested for worthiness and selected to achieve adulthood and begin the process of repopulating the regenerated Earth.

To indicate the androgyny of Urb's inhabitants, the author avoids the use of gendered pronouns throughout the novel, aside from a few slip-ups; the cover blurbs of the original edition spoils the conceit by referring to the main character as male.

== Reception ==
Robert M. Price feels the book "seems to wander pointlessly for much of its length, recounting mildly interesting oddities like a gallery of 3-D pictures in which several people have taken up residence ... most of [which] seems to misfire." He finds that "the final tour-de-force is quite clever and explains ... the tone of the book up to that point, [but is] not sure it justifies it."
