= Invisible Death =

1975 novel by Lin Carter

- Cover of first edition
- Author: Lin Carter
- Cover artist: Tim Lewis
- Language: English
- Series: Zarkon series
- Genre: Science fiction
- Publisher: Doubleday
- Publication date: 1975
- Publication place: United States
- Media type: Print (hardcover)
- Pages: xii, 173
- ISBN: 0-385-08768-3
- Preceded by: The Nemesis of Evil
- Followed by: The Volcano Ogre

Invisible Death is a science fiction novel by American writer Lin Carter, the second in his "Zarkon, Lord of the Unknown" series. It was first published in hardcover by Doubleday in November 1975, with a paperback edition following from Popular Library in July 1978. It was reissued by Wildside Press in December 1999. An ebook edition was issued by Thunderchild Publishing in September 2017.

== Summary ==
Rich, powerful and wealthy members of society are being struck down, one after another, without a clue as to how. Only Prince Zarkon and his Omega Crew can hope to resolve the mystery and end the terror, which turns out to be perpetrated by the Grim Reaper, a supervillain who broadcasts death over the radio to the millionaires who won't pay his price.

== Reception ==
Robert M. Price characterizes the Zarkon series as "five delightful novels ... Lin Carter's loving homage to Doc Savage and his creator Lester Dent." They celebrate "'the gloriously fourth-rate,' the pulps, radio, comics, and movies he loved as a kid." He notes that "[t]he novels manage quite successfully to walk the tightrope between salute and parody," and "the humor never seems to impede or undermine the action." While "[i]t is not difficult to pick out a flaw here and there" and the series is "not entirely free from Carter's later-career sloppiness ... on the whole these books are vastly superior to much of what else he was writing during the same period. The Zarkon novels all command a crisp, snappy prose, sometimes reminiscent of Lester Dent's."

The book was also reviewed by W. N. MacPherson in The Science Fiction Review Monthly, December 1975.
