= Time War (novel) =

1974 novel by Lin Carter

- Cover from first edition
- Author: Lin Carter
- Cover artist: Frank Frazetta
- Language: English
- Genre: Science fiction
- Publisher: Dell Books
- Publication date: 1974
- Publication place: United States
- Media type: Print (paperback)
- Pages: 160
- OCLC: 3075809

Time War is a science fiction novel by American writer Lin Carter. It was first published in paperback by Dell Books in November 1974. It was reissued in trade paperback by Wildside Press in March 2018. It also appeared in Staying in Place: An Anthology of Stories to Pass the Time, issued as an ebook by Wildside Press in June 2020. The first British edition was issued as an ebook by Gateway/Orion in October 2019. The book has also appeared in German translation.

== Plot summary ==
Electronic scientist and industrialist John Lux believes himself an ordinary twentieth century man, until, in a sudden attack, he discovers he has the unsuspected ability to teleport himself to safety. He soon learns that he is a pawn in a time war, targeted for destruction by forces from a decadent and doomed civilization 200,000 years in the future. In an adventure through time and alternate possibilities, only he might be able save the future, and only if he learns how to use his dormant superhuman powers.

According to the "Author's Note" at the end of the book, the novel was intended as a pastiche of the works of A. E. van Vogt.
