= Irving Greenfield =

American professor and author (1929–2020)

Irving A. Greenfield
- Born: February 22, 1929; Brooklyn, New York
- Died: April 1, 2020 (aged 91)
- Occupation: Writer
- Writing career
- Genres: historical fantasy, science fiction
- Notable works: Ancient of Days, Tagget, Only the Dead Speak Russian

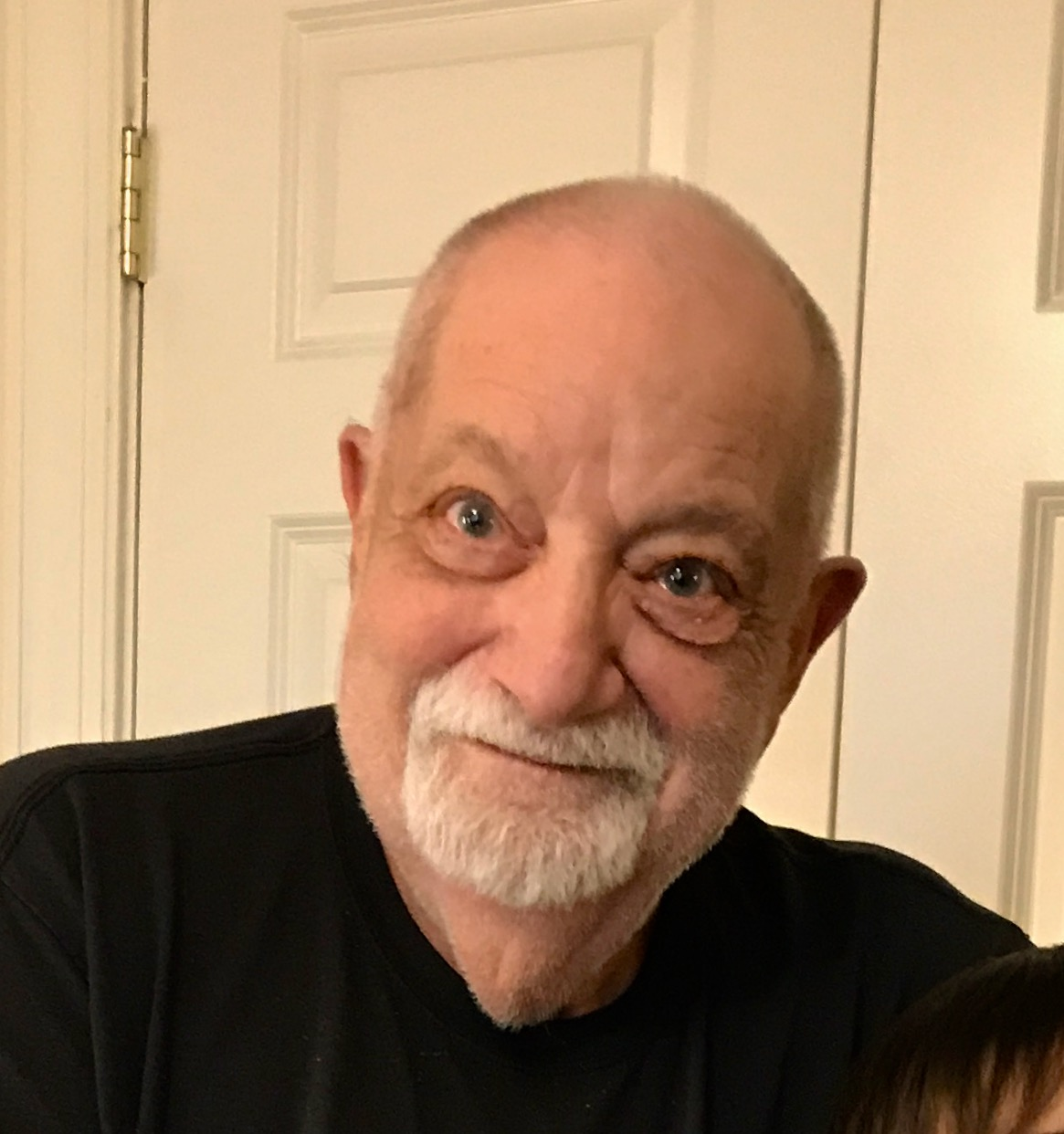

Irving A. Greenfield (1929–2020) was a humanities professor and the prolific author of over 300 novels. He is best known as the writer of Ancient of Days and Only the Dead Speak Russian.

== Biography ==
Dr. Irving Greenfield was born in Brooklyn, New York on February 22, 1929. Graduating from Brooklyn College in 1950, Greenfield spent two years in the Merchant Marine and served during the Korean War in the combat infantry. He was later awarded a PhD for his work in fiction.

For 18 years, Greenfield taught as an Associate Professor (Adjunct) at Wagner College in the Humanities Department. Greenfield subsequently taught at the Discovery Institute at the College of Staten Island.

Dr. Greenfield was married to Anita G. Mittag. They had 2 sons: Richard (1955) and Nathan (1958).

== Creative work ==
Dr. Irving Greenfield's work has appeared in a variety of media. Greenfield's short stories have appeared in several publications, including Amsterdam Quarterly, The Vignette Review, A Thousand and One Stories, Maudlin House, Hippocampus Magazine, Electron Magazine, Chicago Literati, The Stone Canoe (electronic edition), The Stone Hobo, Contraposition, The Furious Gazelle, Festival Writer, Shadowgraph, Way Too Fantasy, Prime Mincer, Lavender Wolves Literary Journal, eFiction Mag, Foliate Oak Literary Magazine, The Note, Sleet Magazine, Barking Sycamores, Writing for Tomorrow, The Raven's Perch, Brawler, Runaway Parade, and Amarillo Bay.

Universal International adapted his novel Tagget into a 1991 film for TV starring Daniel J. Travanti. Greenfield has additionally published one-act and full-length plays, to much critical acclaim. His one-act play, "Billy," was one of five nominated winners of the Yukon Pacific Play Award, and also won a Nova Award for the most original play on CTV. Greenfield'a video play, "Camp #2, Bucharest," won a Nova Award for the best drama of 1998 on Community Access TV. Finally, his novel, Ancient of Days, was on the New York Post's bestseller list for six weeks, though his masterpiece is typically considered to be his novel, Only the Dead Speak Russian.

== Bibliography ==
This listing is incomplete.

=== Mainstream fiction ===
- The U.F.O. Report (1967)
- Ichabod Rides Again (1972)
- The Sexplorer (1972)
- Making U Hoo (1973)
- Encountering (1973)
- The Glow of Morning (1973)
- A Flame On The Wind (1975)
- Doesn't Everyone (1977)
- Who Knows (1977)
- Fort Bliss (1977)
- Barracuda (1978)
- High Terror (1978)
- Tagget (1979)
- Agent Out of Place (1982)
- No Better World (1982)
- The Fate of an Eagle (1989)
- Over the Brink (1990)
- Beneath the Snow (1993)
- Rush to Judgement (1995)
- Only the Dead Speak Russian (2001)
- And Then You Die (2001)
- Judah (2002)
- Snow Giants Dancing (2012)
- Beyond Valor (2013)
- MacKenna's Piece (2015)

=== Western fiction ===
==== Thomas Carey Western Thrillers ====
1. The Carey Blood (1972)
2. Carey's Vengeance (1972)
3. The Carey Gun (1974)

=== Military fiction ===
==== Navy ====
1. Battle Stations (1988, as by Roger Jewett)
2. Carrier War (1989, as by Roger Jewett)
3. On Station (1989, as by Roger Jewett)

=== Romance ===
- The Terrified Target (1966, as by Alicia Grace)
- Head of Medusa (1967, as by Alicia Grace)
- Hour Of Evil (1967, as by Alicia Grace)
- Enchanted Circle (1968, as by Alicia Grace)
- Clovecrest (1969, as by Alicia Grace)
- Mass For A Dead Witch (1970, as by Alicia Grace)
- House of the Darkest Death (1971, as by Alicia Grace)
- The House at Swansea (1972, as by Alicia Grace)
- The Terrified Heart (1973, as by Alicia Grace)
- Hawksbill Manor (1974, as by Alicia Grace)
- Wharf Sinister (1976, as by Alicia Grace)

=== Speculative fiction ===
==== Depth Force Series ====
1. Depth Force (1984)
2. Death Dive (1984)
3. Bloody Seas (1985)
4. Battle Stations (1985)
5. Torpedo Tomb (1986)
6. Sea of Flames (1986)
7. Deep Kill (1986)
8. Suicide Run (1987)
9. Death Cruise (1988)
10. Ice Island (1988)
11. Harbor of Doom (1989)
12. Warmonger (1989)
13. Deep Rescue (1990)
14. Torpedo Treasure (1991)
15. Hot Zone (1992)
16. Rig War (1992)

==== Depth Force Thrillers ====
1. Project Discovery (1988)

==== Other speculative fiction novels ====
- The Waters of Death (1967)
- Mirror Image (1968, as by Bruce Duncan)
- The Others (1969)
- Succubus: A Novel of Erotic Possession (1970)
- The Ancient of Days (1973)
- A Play of Darkness (1974)
- The Stars Will Judge (1974; reprinted as Star Trial (1977))
- Aton (1975)
- To Savor the Past (1975)
- The Face of Him (1976)
- Julius Caesar Is Alive and Well (1977)
- The Gods' Temptress (1978)
- The Fate of an Eagle (1990)
- Over the Brink (1990)

=== Collections ===
- Flying Into Tomorrow (2006)

==== Short fiction ====
- "On Being Haunted" (2014)

=== Drama ===
- Billy
- Camp #2, Bucharest (1998)
