= Giant of World's End =

1969 novel by Lin Carter

- first edition of Giant of World's End
- Author: Lin Carter
- Cover artist: Jeff Jones
- Language: English
- Series: Gondwane Epic
- Genre: Fantasy novel
- Publisher: Belmont Books
- Publication date: 1969
- Publication place: United States
- Media type: Print (Paperback)
- Pages: 141 pp
- OCLC: 03061443
- LC Class: PS3553.A7823 G5x 1969
- Preceded by: The Pirate of World's End

Giant of World's End is a fantasy novel written by Lin Carter set on a decadent far-future Earth in which all the world's land masses have supposedly drifted back together to form a last supercontinent called Gondwane. The book is chronologically the last in Carter's Gondwane Epic, five prequel novels set earlier in time being issued later. It was first published in paperback by Belmont Books in February 1969. The first British edition was issued in paperback by Five Star in 1972. The book has been translated into Polish.

== Plot summary ==
Gondwane is a crazy-quilt of human and non-human societies divided into myriads of states and tribes, all built atop the detritus of seven hundred million years of previous civilizations. Over this span the laws of physics have changed, and science been largely superseded by magic. The present era, "The Eon of the Falling Moon", looks to be this far-future world's last, as the Moon has long been in a slowly decaying orbit that now threatens the planet with imminent destruction.

The gigantic hero Ganelon Silvermane is a Construct made by long-extinct Time Gods, who had foreseen a succession of great world crises and created heroes to deal with them. Each is preserved in the Ardelix Time Vault until awakened by the onset of the crisis it is intended he resolve. Ganelon himself is the one designated to save the world from its own satellite, though how he is to do so is problematic; as he was awoken prematurely by an earthquake, before the crucial knowledge of his precise role could be instilled.

Aided by the magician Zolobion and the warrior maid Arzeela, who loves him unrequitedly (he was built for heroics, not romance) Ganelon sets out from the land of the great Stone Face to seek the means of mankind's salvation. Ultimately, they locate the necessary device, only to discover that it can only be operated at the cost of the user's life. This the hero is willing to do, as his sole reason for being is to save humanity. But Arzeela, unable to bear the thought of his death, takes his place in the device, dying in his stead.

The Moon is destroyed, leaving a silvery ring of debris around the Earth in its place and the world to survive into a new era, "The Eon of the Silver Phoenix". Ganelon, however, is left distraught and bereft of purpose. Mourning his lost companion and unable to understand the feelings that led to her self-sacrifice, he makes it his new goal to discover the nature of love.

== Sources ==
Robert M. Price, Carter's literary executor, wrote that "[t]he "World's End" books are compounded of about equal parts of A. E. van Vogt's The Book of Ptath, Jack Vance's The Dying Earth, Clark Ashton Smith's "Zothique" tales, and Carter's own Tower of the Medusa ... with a little Oz thrown in for extra silliness.

== Prospective sequels ==
According to Robert M. Price, Giant was originally envisioned as the first volume in a trilogy. "The others would have been The Wizard of World's End, focusing on [the] sorcerer Zelobion, and The Amazon of World's End, featuring [the] warrior-maid Arzeela." He later abandoned the plan in favor of writing a series of prequels, making Giant "the ending rather than the beginning of the projected saga."

== Reception ==
Robert Price formed the opinion that the Gondwane novels were "no good." He writes "They suffer form the same malady that afflicted Amalric (and which ... blaze into fever in The Wizard of Zao and the 'Terra Magica' series); the lame and self-consciously cute attempts at humor ... only succeed in hampering and tripping up novels that are straining at their halters to become straight, robust Carter Sword & Sorcery yarns. Giant and Barbarian almost manage it, but not quite." The "series contain[s] the stuff of vintage Carter fantasy epics, but the books suffer ... from an omnipresent patina of frivolity that continually undermines the reader's suspension of disbelief, and ... from a queer distancing of the narration." He notes that "[o]n the whole, the Gondwane books manifest strangely lax and undisciplined writing ... commit[ting] conceptual and continuity blunders and ... rationalizing the difficulty .. in a contrived manner ... Some gaffes he never seems to notice."

The book was also reviewed by Richard Brisson in Luna Monthly no. 1, June 1969, and by Brian Earl Brown and Wayne Warfield in Phantasy Digest no. 1, 1976.
