= The Nemesis of Evil =

1975 novel by Lin Carter

- Cover of first edition
- Author: Lin Carter
- Cover artist: Tim Lewis
- Language: English
- Series: Zarkon series
- Genre: Science fiction
- Publisher: Doubleday
- Publication date: 1975
- Publication place: United States
- Media type: Print (hardcover)
- Pages: xiv, 172
- ISBN: 0-385-00583-0
- Followed by: Invisible Death

The Nemesis of Evil is a science fiction novel by American writer Lin Carter, the first in his "Zarkon, Lord of the Unknown" series. It was first published in hardcover by Doubleday in 1975, with a paperback edition following from Popular Library in March 1978. It was reissued by Wildside Press in 1999. An ebook edition was issued by Thunderchild Publishing in August 2017.

== Summary ==
Zarkon, the Ultimate Man, is sent back to the present from the future to prevent the otherwise inevitable triumph of evil over mankind. After saving and becoming the prince of the small Balkan nation of Novenia, he uses his amassed fortune to assemble a team of Omega Men to combat the arch criminals who would otherwise conquer the world. He battles Lucifer, leader of the fraudulent Brotherhood of Lemuria, who is actually a scientific genius named Dr. Zandor Sinesto. Elvira, with her "lucious, well-formed lips" and heaving bosom provides romantic interest.

== Reception ==
Robert M. Price characterizes the Zarkon series as "five delightful novels ... Lin Carter's loving homage to Doc Savage and his creator Lester Dent." They celebrate "'the gloriously fourth-rate,' the pulps, radio, comics, and movies he loved as a kid." He notes that "[t]he novels manage quite successfully to walk the tightrope between salute and parody," and "the humor never seems to impede or undermine the action." While "[i]t is not difficult to pick out a flaw here and there" and the series is "not entirely free from Carter's later-career sloppiness ... on the whole these books are vastly superior to much of what else he was writing during the same period. The Zarkon novels all command a crisp, snappy prose, sometimes reminiscent of Lester Dent's."

Marguerite Burgess in Library Journal writes "You want this spoof of the Doc Savage stories to work, but sadly it does not." Calling it a "comic book sans pictures," she rates it as "[n]ot recommended for library purchase" though without utterly dismissing it. "There is a place for this undemanding, basically good-humored genre: the newsstand."

The book was also reviewed by Don Yee in The Science Fiction Review, August 1975, James K. Burk in Delap's F & SF Review, October 1975, and Algis Budrys in The Magazine of Fantasy and Science Fiction, March 1976.
