= Tara of the Twilight =

1979 novel by Lin Carter

- Cover of the first edition.
- Author: Lin Carter
- Cover artist: Gino D'Achille
- Language: English
- Genre: Fantasy
- Publisher: Zebra Books
- Publication date: 1979
- Publication place: United States
- Media type: Print (Paperback)
- Pages: 288
- ISBN: 0-89083-516-0
- OCLC: 11420119
- LC Class: PS3553.A7823

Tara of the Twilight is a fantasy novel by American writer Lin Carter. It was first published in paperback by Zebra Books in October 1979. The first British edition was published as an ebook by Gateway/Orion in April 2020.

According to Carter's introductory note, Tara of the Twilight represents his attempt to combine the genre of sword and sorcery with pornographic fantasy. Based on the unresolved state of the plot, he evidently projected at least one sequel, and three Tara short stories ("For the Blood is the Life", "The Love of the Sea" and "Pale Shadow") were published in the mid-1980s that presumably would have formed the basis for such a volume. A collected edition with the original novel plus the three short stories was published as a chapbook by Sabre Press in September, 2025.

== Plot summary ==
Tara, a foundling, has been raised as the ward of Chanthu the sorcerer to be a War Maid, a member of an order of virgin swordswomen. At sixteen she is sent on a quest into the Twilight, a dim, dangerous and mysterious realm full of violence and magic, to discover the mystery of her origins. Her friend and protector Khaldur, a highly intelligent lion-like carnivore, accompanies her.

Unfortunately for Tara (the goddess of her order being quite strict on the virginity requirement), the Twilight proves to be a hotbed of decadence and perversion. Her quest devolves a series of captivities and escapes, in which she is in turn separated from and reunited with her feline guardian. She is successively enslaved by lecherous inhabitants of the city of Paltossa, the Northern Barbarians, the sorceresses of the Witch Wood, and the sorcerer Sarkon and his three Womanthing minions.

During the course of her adventures Tara picks up additional companions, including the bisexual girl Evalla, the Lion Warrior Thund, and the teenage boy Zorak, all of whom provide opportunities for sex play between adventures. Throughout all, she somehow manages to maintain a technical virginity, primarily because her various antagonists seem too depraved to consider ordinary intercourse, while her male companions are either too honorable, too inhibited, or too distracted by the bisexual Evalla.

The novel ends with the quest unfinished, and the mysteries of Tara's heritage and destiny unresolved, with the travelers flying onward to new adventures in their magical air-gondola.

== Sources ==
- Robertson, Michelle. "Tara of the Twilight and Phallocentrism in Modern Fantasy." Article in Apostle of Letters: A Critical Evaluation of the Works of Lin Carter, edited by Stephen J. Servello. Wild Cat Books, 2006, pp. 123–139.
