= Galleon of Dream =

1953 collection of poems by Lin Carter

- Cover
- Author: Lin Carter
- Illustrator: Lin Carter
- Cover artist: Lin Carter
- Language: English
- Genre: poetry
- Publisher: The Sign of the Centaur
- Publication date: 1953
- Publication place: United States
- Media type: Print
- Pages: 24
- OCLC: 52064669
- Preceded by: Sandalwood and Jade
- Followed by: A Letter to Judith

Galleon of Dream: Poems of Fantasy and Wonder is a poetry collection written and illustrated by Lin Carter. The book was released in paperback by The Sign of the Centaur in 1953. in a limited edition of 200 copies. The book is dedicated to Doris Margaret Derrick, "friend and teacher."

== Background ==
Carter intended the book as a companion to his earlier verse collection Sandalwood and Jade, which, like it, contained lyrical verses of a "fantastic nature." Disclaiming innovation in his poetry, and disdaining "the confusing, uneven and unreadable verse-forms in which modern poetry is torturing its public," he lists his inspirations as Percy Bysshe Shelley, Alfred, Lord Tennyson, John Masefield, Lord Byron, the anonymous author of The Song of Solomon and the pseudonymous author of The Kasidah of Hadji Abdu el Yezdi, Edmund Spenser, Bilhana, George Sterling, Lilith Lorraine, Rudyard Kipling, and Robert Louis Stevenson.

== Summary ==
The collection consists of thirty poems, lavishly illustrated, together with a foreword by the author.

== Contents ==
- "Foreword"
- "credits"
- "dedication"
- "Contents"
- "Galleon of Dream"
- "Nightmare"
- "Dark Elixer" (from Sky Hook #7, Sum. 1949)
- "Changeling" (from Poemzine #1, Nov. 1948)
- "Futility" (from Loki #2, Sum. 1948, Palmetto & Pine Literary Supplement #2, Win. 1948)
- "If I were King of Kooriball" (from Palmetto & Pine Literary Supplement #2, Win. 1948)
- "In The Days of King Arthur"
- "Golden Fleece"
- "Fiddler's Green"
- "Hashish and Sandalwood"
- "Magic Carpet"
- "Wish"
- "Beside the Shalimar" (from Starlanes #9, Spr. 1953)
- "Shadow-Song: Inspired by Abraham Merritt's 'Creep, Shadow'" (from The Time Machine #1, 1948, Kotan #1, Sep. 1948)
- "Cathay: Impressions of The Orient"
- "Treasure Island" (from Starlanes #10, Sum. 1953)
- "Story-book Seas" (from Cataclysm v.2 #3, Nov. 1952)
- "The Yellow-brick Road to Oz"
- "Fairyland"
- "City in The Sea" (from Mezrab #4, Spr. 1951_
- "Nocturne" (from Loki #2, Sum. 1948)
- "Vagabond's Song"
- "Oft Have I Visioned Eastern Lands"
- "collectors corner"
- "Ivanhoe"
- "Song of the Crusades"
- "The Wind in the Rigging" (later reprinted in Dreams from R'lyeh, 1975)
- "The Horns of Elfland: Variation Upon a Theme by Tennyson"
- "the star-storm"
- "Tradewind"
