= Mandricardo (novel) =

1987 novel by Lin Carter

- Cover of first edition
- Author: Lin Carter
- Cover artist: Walter Velez
- Language: English
- Series: Terra Magica
- Genre: Fantasy
- Publisher: DAW Books
- Publication date: 1987
- Publication place: United States
- Media type: Print (Paperback)
- Pages: 223
- ISBN: 0-88677-180-3
- OCLC: 15092465
- Dewey Decimal: 813.54 .C2465m
- LC Class: PS3553.A7823 M36 1987
- Preceded by: Dragonrouge
- Followed by: Callipygia

Mandricardo : New Adventures in Terra Magica is a fantasy novel by American writer Lin Carter, the third in his series about the fictional "Flat Earth" of Terra Magica. It was first published in paperback by DAW Books in January 1987. A trade paperback edition was published by Wildside Press in 2001, with an ebook edition following from Gateway/Orion in March 2020.

== Plot summary ==
The novel's setting of Terra Magica is "the world as imagined by Dark Age European geographers and bestiary-writers," envisioned as one that "actually exists as a world parallel to our own. There magic works, hippogryphs and mantichores roam free, the earth is flat, paynims worship Termagant, and there is no Western Hemisphere."

The story features two characters introduced in previous volumes, Mandricardo of Tartary, namesake of his purported ancestor from Carolingian legend, and his lady love, the Amazon Callipygia. The bickering duo resumes their quest through Terra Magica in adventures involving a magic carpet, a troll's ring, a salamandre and undina, the wicked enchanter Gorgonzola and his assistant Limburger, and such other worthies as Akhdar the Green, Ithuriel, and various princesses, nabobs and demons.

Again, chapter notes at the end of the book reference the sources in earlier fantasy literature of various creatures and character and place names used by the author.

== Sources ==
Carter "admits to having got the idea for the [Terra Magica series] from 'Thackeray's delightful treatise, The Rose and the Ring, a splendid spoof of fairy tales,'" with "nods to other fantasy classics as well," including Baum's The Wonderful Wizard of Oz, Cabell's The High Place, Beckford's Vathek, and Vance's The Dying Earth.

== Reception ==
Robert M. Price, writes "[a]ll the faults of [Carter's] Gondwane and Green Star books are collected here. The humor is broader and more ham-handed than ever. ... Or at least it's supposed to be. ... I suspect that most [readers] will find it growing a bit thin before arriving at the end of several volumes of it." While conceding the series is intended as a parody or spoof, he notes "[t]here are some things, many things, from which [such] does not exempt a writer," including repetitiveness, failure to think things through in advance, poor continuity that "credit[s] exploits from ... previous book[s] to the wrong character," and an "intrusively and self-consciously cute" authorial voice. Price also observes that the protagonists, supposedly warriors, "scarcely ever lift a sword;" indeed, "[t]here is almost no fighting, only a series of perils and escapes, an endless chain of rescues by magicians, fairy godmothers, flying carpets, wishing rings, etc."

Lynn F. Williams in Fantasy Review, characterizing the book (and series) as "burlesque sword and sorcery adventure," notes its appearance with the observation that "Carter has now produced a third volume ... Why, the Lord only knows." While conceding there is nothing "inherently wrong with [such] a lighthearted adventure tale," she scores the author for his "archly cute style" ("unbearably heavy-handed and un-funny"), and addiction to words like "tummy" and character names like Gorgonzola and Limburger. "However, Carter's worst crime is that he makes Mandricardo talk in a dreadful 'tally-ho, you blighter' style and then has the nerve to blame it on the influence of T. H. White." She concludes that "[t]his book should have been marketed as a juvenile. I doubt that anyone past the third grade will be able to stand it."
