= The Star Magicians =

1966 novel by Lin Carter

- Cover from first publication, in The; Off-Worlders/The Star Magicians
- Author: Lin Carter
- Cover artist: Jack Gaughan
- Language: English
- Series: Tales of the Near Stars
- Genre: Science fiction
- Publisher: Ace Books
- Publication date: 1966
- Publication place: United States
- Media type: Print (paperback)
- Pages: 124
- OCLC: 5543959
- Followed by: Tower at the Edge of Time

The Star Magicians is a science fiction novel by American writer Lin Carter, the first in his Tales of the Near Stars series. It was first published in paperback by Ace Books in August 1966 together with the unrelated John Baxter novel The Off-Worlders as the "Ace Double" anthology, The Off-Worlders/The Star Magicians. The first stand-alone edition was issued by British publisher Gateway/Orion as an ebook in December 2019.

== Plot summary ==
A prologue relates the breakup of the Carina stellar empire, beset on its borders by the barbarian Star Rovers and sinking into a dark age. One world preserves civilizations and resists the Rovers—Parlion, whose inhabitants, called the White Wizards, are deemed magicians by the inhabitants of other star systems.

The plot follows Drask of the Rim Stars, Warlord of the Star Rovers, initially encountered observing gladiatorial death struggles on a conquered world as he fondles a female slave, princess of the defeated realm. One combatant, the condemned minstrel Perion of North Hollis, excels in the arena, and Drask pardons him, inviting him to feast with the Rovers. Perion saves the warlord from a knife attack by the princess. Thwarted, she commits suicide, and the Rovers continue their feast.

Conversation turns to the subject of their principal enemy, the White Wizard Calastor, whose hidden identity, command of forgotten science, and many devoted followers make him a formidable threat. Drask selects a new plaything, the dancing girl Lurn, who also tries to stab him. Investigation reveals her to be a priestess of another of Drask's enemies, an apparently cosmic entity known as the Green Goddess of Malkh.

Evading the Rovers' clutches, Lurn later resurfaces in the company of Perion, who is now revealed as Calastor; the two escape by teleporting to the latter's spacecraft. Perion/Calastor worries over the progress of Drask's conquests, which threaten the planet the Wizards are grooming as the springboard of a revived galactic empire.

A confrontation ensues on Xulthoom, a haunted world of ancient ruins, perpetual mist, and madness. There Calastor's mechinations make the Rovers to hear voices, turning them against each other and driving them crazy. Even Drask is not immune, though the voice he hears is none of Calastor's doing, but that of the Green Goddess, threatening him with dire consequence unless he goes back to the Rim Stars.

But Drask only retreats from Xulthoom to move on to his next target world, the very one the Wizards want to save. Calastor calls in help from Parlion, and the assembled White Wizards conjure up space dragons to turn away the Star Rovers. The barbarians' shaman Abdekiel realizes the dragons are an illusion, and the ruse fails. Frantic, Calastor and his allies teleport themselves to Drask's flagship. In the final conflict, the Wizards disarm the crew through their mental powers while Calastor engages Drask in a desperate swordfight.

Then the Green Goddess intervenes. She destroys the Star Rover fleet and isolates the principal combatants. Drask is condemned, while Calastor and Lurn are preserved for a brighter fate, to wed and rule over the world that will birth the new empire.

== Relation to other works ==
The Tales of the Near Stars series comprises this novel plus Tower at the Edge of Time (1968) and Tower of the Medusa (1969), all of which take place after the fall of in the wake of the interstellar Carina Empire. Its collapse has left the civilization of the surviving planets in ruins, with some isolated and others reduced to barbarism. Their cultural diversity has produced an odd mix of advanced technology and seeming sorcery amid the inhabited worlds. Similarities in situation to Carter's History of the Great Imperium series have led critic John Clute to link this book and Tower of the Medusa to that sequence, though the Imperium books are usually considered to consist solely of three other novels, The Man Without a Planet (1966), Star Rogue (1970), and Outworlder (1971)

== Reception ==
John Clute, briefly assessing Carter's science fiction corpus, notes that this sequence "adheres moderately closely to sf protocols and to the 'feel' of sf."

Cora Buhlert, reviewing the book for Galactic Journey, feels "Carter was aiming [to recreate] Isaac Asimov's Foundation as [if] written by Robert E. Howard. However, Carter has the skill of neither Asimov nor Howard and so the result is just a mess." She regards the novel as "terrible," "certainly the worst book I have ever reviewed for Galactic Journey," with a "hackneyed" plot, and "tortured prose," "so purple that it almost crosses over into ultraviolet." She excoriates Carter's information dumping via the "clunky" prologue and dialogues between the characters, and calls the character Abdekiel "an offensive Asian stereotype." She is somewhat more charitable in regard to the setting, calling the planet Xulthoom "a fascinating setting" with a "spooky atmosphere" that "even [Carter] manages to convey." She characterizes the climactic swordfight as "remarkably well described," and appreciates how the deus ex machina ending "scene [is] strikingly illustrated by Jack Gaughan on the cover." She concludes "this novel has one redeeming feature: it is at least entertainingly terrible. In fact, the book is utterly hilarious. ... If The Star Magicians were a parody, it would be absolutely brilliant. But unfortunately, it's supposed to be a serious space opera adventure."
