= Dave Van Arnam =

American author (born 1935)

- Born: July 31, 1935; Columbus, Ohio, U.S.
- Died: August 3, 2002 (aged 67); Albany, California, U.S.
- Occupation: Author
- Writing career
- Genre: science fiction

David Gerald Van Arnam (1935–2002) was an American science fiction fan and author. He wrote as Dave Van Arnam and David G. Van Arnam.

== Biography ==
Van Arnam was born July 31, 1935 in Columbus, Ohio, the son of Gerald Pierce and Ethel Alice (Biehl) Van Arnam. His parents were public school teachers in Mansfield, Ohio. The Van Arnams were living in St. Petersburg, Florida in March, 1950. On March 10, 1950, they took ship from New York to Europe on a trip abroad projected for one year, though in fact they returned October 3, 1950. In 1952 they were again residing in St. Petersberg. Van Arnam served in the U.S. Army from October 28, 1958 – August 10, 1960.

He married fellow science fiction fan Cindy Heap on April 1, 1967. She was born Cynthia Anne Cramer on October 14, 1942, and had formerly been married to fan George Heap. Their daughter Wendy Fawn Van Arnam was born October 6, 1967. The Van Arnams were granted a divorce on May 25, 1973, in Pinellas County, Florida. Later, Van Arnam married Della Marianne Delaney on May 30, 1980, in Reno, Nevada.

Van Arnam died August 3, 2002, in Albany, California, and was buried in Section 10, Site 1431, San Joaquin Valley National Cemetery, Gustine, California. His widow Marianne died November 30, 2012.

== Literary career ==
Van Arnam was a prominent science fiction fan from the early 1960s, a member of a number of different fan organizations and amateur press associations, and publisher of and contributor to a large number of fanzines and apazines. During that time he was "in a very active circle of New Yorkers who included a thoroughly mixed group of fans, pros, and fans-turned-pros ... the wall of separation between fan and pro [being] very thin and permeable" according to Richard A. Lupoff, another member of that circle. In Lupoff's recollection, the group also included James Blish, Algis Budrys, Terry Carr, Lin Carter, Lee Hoffman, Larry Shaw, Ted White, and Donald A. Wollheim. Van Arnham wrote the bulk of The Reader's Guide to Barsoom and Amtor (1963), a famous early literary exploration of the works of Edgar Rice Burroughs. He and Ted White were co-chairmen of the 1967 Worldcon (NyCon 3) held August 31-September 4, 1967 in New York City.

His career as a professional author began with a novelization from Lost in Space, co-written with "Ron Archer" (Ted White) in 1967, and he wrote a number of other novels in the late 1960s and early 1970s, one again written with Ted White. He stopped publishing after 1972. All of Van Arnam's novels were revived in the twenty-first century, starting with Sideslip (Ramble House, 2008) and ending with Lost in Space (TV Classics Press, 2018); in between, Wildside Press reissued the remainder in 2014.

== Bibliography ==
=== Zantain series ===
- The Players of Hell (Belmont Books, 1968)
- Wizard of Storms (Belmont Books, 1970)

=== Jamnar/Star Barbarian ===
- Star Barbarian (Lancer Books, 1969)
- Lord of Blood (Lancer Books, 1970)

=== Other novels ===
- Lost in Space (Pyramid Books, 1967, with Ted White, as Ron Archer)
- Star Gladiator (Belmont Books, 1967)
- Sideslip (Pyramid Books, 1968, with Ted White)
- Starmind (Ballantine Books, 1969)
- Greyland (Belmont Tower, 1972)

=== Nonfiction ===
- The Reader's Guide to Barsoom and Amtor (Richard Lupoff, 1963, as by David G. Van Arnam and others (Richard A. Lupoff, Larry Ivie, and Donald A. Wollheim)
