= The Flame of Iridar =

1967 novella by Lin Carter

- Cover from first publication, in The; Flame of Iridar / Peril of the Starmen
- Author: Lin Carter
- Language: English
- Genre: Science fantasy
- Publisher: Belmont Books
- Publication date: 1967
- Publication place: United States
- Media type: Print (paperback)
- Pages: 172
- OCLC: 02156964

The Flame of Iridar is a science fantasy novella by American writer Lin Carter set on an ancient, inhabited Mars. It was first published in paperback by Belmont Books in May 1967 together with the unrelated Kris Neville novella Peril of the Starmen as the "Belmont Double" anthology, The Flame of Iridar/Peril of the Starmen. The anthology was reissued in trade paperback by Wildside Press in August 2018. A chapbook of the Carter work alone, constituting its first stand-alone edition, was published by Sabre Press in 2019. The first British edition was issued in ebook by Gateway/Orion in January 2020.

== Plot summary ==
On the planet Mars, ten million years ago, the pirate prince Chandar, rightfully king of the island kingdom of Orm, is freed from imprisonment in the city of Shiangkor by the sinister Sarkond the Enchanter. While Sarkond ostensibly serves King Niamnon, the villain who slew Chandar's father and usurped his throne, the magician secretly has his own agenda. He plans to use Chandar's royal blood to power a talisman granting entry to Iophar, the legendary land of magic, where he hopes to gain the power to become tyrant over all Mars.

Together with Chandar's pirate companion Bram and Sarkon's assistant Mnadis the Witch, The ill-sorted pair succeed in entering Iophar. They are brought for judgment before Llys, queen and high priestess to its benevolent guardian god, and the god itself, the Flame of Iridar, a sentient vortex of living fire deriving from the sun. Sarkon's malevolence is revealed and he is slain, but then Mnadis reveals her true colors; as Llys serves the Flame, so too is she the servant of its evil counterpart, the Dark Flame.

A cosmic conflict between the two energy beings ensues, with the fate of the Solar System at stake. It culminates back in Shiangkor, where, with the aid of Chandar and his enchanted axe, the Flame triumphs. Restored to his throne, Chandar commences the consolidation of Mars's various kingdoms under his own rule.

== Sources ==
According to Robert M. Price, the novella's version of prehistoric Mars likely derived from that of Leigh Brackett in The Sword of Rhiannon, and the godlike Flame from the similar Oyarsa-spirit of C. S. Lewis's Out of the Silent Planet.

== Relation to other works ==
Carter contemplated a sequel in which Chandar's son Prince Thar was to quest for a talisman called the Sword of Psamathis. While never written, this story is referenced in his later Thongor of Lemuria novel Thongor at the End of Time, in the hero's "vision[s] of heroic doings throughout time and space," one of which shows Thar succeeding in this mission. The Thongor series also essentially borrowed the character, featuring another Prince Thar as Thongor's son rather than Chandar's. As with the original, Carter also planned but failed to write sequels featuring this Thar.

Carter's later "Mysteries of Mars" series, while set in the future rather than the distant past, "seems to presuppose The Flame of Iridar, though it is in no sense a sequel to it."

== Reception ==
Robert M. Price finds the novella of interest as "a precursor to, [and] rehearsal for, the Thongor series," feeling that "had Carter submitted the [draft] to Donald Wolheim at Ace Books, Chandar would have beaten Thongor into print instead of following him by two years." He considers it "a great leap beyond" the author's earlier, unpublished works.
