= David Graham (author) =

British crime fiction author

David Graham was the pen name of Evan (or Wilbur) Wright (1919–1994), a British crime fiction author who is mainly remembered for his post-apocalyptic novel, Down to a Sunless Sea.

== RAF career ==
Wilbur Wright was an RAF pilot in World War II. He served with the RAF as a fighter pilot during World War 2, and subsequently as a flying instructor. He later worked as a technical author for a hovercraft company.

He claimed to have encountered the ghost of a downed gunner in 1941. He self-published an account of this in 1993.

== Bibliography ==
=== Novels ===
==== As David Graham ====
- Down to a Sunless Sea (1979)
- Sidewall (1983)
- Seven Years to Sunset (1985)

==== As Wilbur Wright ====
- Carter's Castle (1983)
- Now Centurion (1991)

=== Non-fiction ===
- Time: Gateway to immortality. Southampton: Wrightway Publishing. (1993)
