= Down to a Sunless Sea (Graham novel) =

1979 novel by David Graham

- First edition
- Author: David Graham
- Language: English
- Genre: Science fiction novel
- Publisher: Robert Hale Ltd.
- Publication date: 1979 (UK)
- Publication place: United Kingdom
- Media type: Print (Hardcover)
- Pages: 320
- ISBN: 0-7091-7836-0
- OCLC: 13700130
- LC Class: PR6057.R233 D6x 1979

David Graham's Down to a Sunless Sea (1979) is a post-apocalyptic novel about a planeload of people during and after a short nuclear war, set in a near-future world where the USA is critically short of oil. The title of the book is taken from a line of the poem Kubla Khan by Samuel Taylor Coleridge.

Lin Carter published (1984) a fantasy novel with the same title (ISBN 978-1-4344-9797-0), also derived from the same Coleridge poem.

== Plot summary ==
The story is told in the first person by Jonah Scott, a British pilot for the fictional airline Air Britain who has arrived in New York City on his regular flight from London. The United States has collapsed after using up nearly all of its oil reserves and the collapse of the dollar.

During the night, Jonah and the apartment superintendent and guard, John Capel, must fight off armed burglars disguised as military police looking for food that Jonah and Senior Flight Attendant Kate Monahan brought with them. Capel is wounded but Kate demonstrates her basic medical skills in cleaning and dressing the wound. Jonah offers to help Capel and a newly orphaned girlfriend, Nikki, of one of his crew travel illegally to London aboard his aircraft, in order to escape the anarchy that has befallen America.

Shortly after takeoff from New York, Jonah is informed that Israel has attacked Beirut, Damascus, and Cairo with nuclear weapons in retaliation for their radioactive poisoning of Tel Aviv's water supply.

Israel's strike triggers a worldwide nuclear holocaust while the plane is en route to London, the Soviet Union and China attacking America and its allies. Four Soviet diplomats on board try to hijack the plane, only to be killed.

Unable to continue to Europe due to the fact that it has suffered nuclear attack, or return to also-attacked New York, the crew attempt to find a place to land their plane. They are granted landing rights at Funchal, but its airport is destroyed by the collision of an El Al flight and a desperate pilot disobeying instructions.

Jonah and his crew wonder whether to crash land on an island in the Azores chain with the help of Juan, a local resident who has contacted them via amateur radio. Jonah sights a NATO airfield, Lajes Field, which is mostly intact. Jonah and the nuclear scientists who are on board deduce that the Soviets needed Lajes intact and accordingly attacked it with a short-lived neutron bomb to occupy it. Jonah lands the plane at Lajes.

Although safe for now, rising levels of fallout from Europe require that they evacuate, and they decide to fly to Antarctica. They are not sure how many passengers they can bring and how many supplies they will need to bring. Jonah and the SAS soldiers on board manage to re-activate the base radar and use the teletype machines to make contact with a sheltered-in-place British naval officer in the Falkland Islands who is able to break cover and confirm with the McMurdo Antarctic base the existence of sufficient provisions, plus a nuclear reactor for warmth. He dies quickly.

A Soviet Antonov freighter aircraft lands at Lajes. Initially suspected of being a Soviet landing party to secure the crucial mid-Atlantic air force base, it turns out to be carrying two female Soviet Air Force crew and a large number of civilian refugees. Next morning both aircraft, fully fueled plus carrying as much extra fuel as possible, fly to Antarctica. When the Antonov cannot make the necessary altitude to overfly the worldwide belt of hot radiation (with the weight of cargo, passengers, and fuel), fifty Soviet volunteers sacrifice themselves by jumping from the plane.

Soon after the characters arrive at McMurdo, it is realised that the tilt of the Earth on its axis is being affected by the numerous nuclear explosions. There are two different endings of Down To A Sunless Sea which suggest either a radioactive death for all the survivors with a theological twist, or minus the polar advance of radiation, a chance for the almost one thousand survivors to rebuild the world.

== Movie ==
A film adaptation was reportedly in development in 2015, according to IMDb and IFTN. In the movie, an Airbus A380 with 600 passengers on a flight from Los Angeles to Tokyo is in-flight when nuclear war breaks out. The movie will possibly star Morgan Freeman.
