= Eric of Zanthodon =

1982 novel by Lin Carter

- Cover of first edition
- Author: Lin Carter
- Illustrator: Josh Kirby
- Cover artist: Josh Kirby
- Language: English
- Series: Zanthodon
- Genre: Science fiction
- Publisher: DAW Books
- Publication date: 1982
- Publication place: United States
- Media type: Print (Paperback)
- Pages: 176
- ISBN: 0-87997-731-0
- OCLC: 8682037
- Preceded by: Darya of the Bronze Age

Eric of Zanthodon is a science fiction novel by American writer Lin Carter, the fifth and last in his series about the fictional "Hollow Earth" land of Zanthodon. It was first published in paperback by DAW Books in May 1982, with an ebook edition following from Gateway/Orion in October 2018. It was also gathered together with the other volumes in the series into the omnibus ebook collection The Zanthodon Megapack (Wildside Press, 2014).

== Plot summary ==
Zanthodon is envisioned as an immense circular cavern five hundred miles wide, one hundred miles beneath the Sahara Desert, a refugium preserving various prehistoric faunas and antique human cultures that have found their way into it throughout the ages.

The story follows the improving fortunes of surface world explorer Eric Carstairs and his Zanthonian love interest Darya. It ends with them leaders of their own tribe, augmented by such other exiles from the surface as Niema and Zuma of the African Aziru tribe and World War II survivors Von Kohler, Bog and Schmidt, and heirs apparent to the leadership of Thandar and Sothar. They are now married and blessed with a young son, Gar.

== Reception ==
Robert M. Price finds the book and series "not without their charming moments," but also sees in them "clear evidence of Lin Carter's increasing carelessness as a writer," exhibiting "an increasing tendency toward self-contradiction and incoherent conception—a greater sloppiness coupled with an exhaustion of imagination."

Steve Servello, writing in Erbzine, calls the novel "the weakest in an extremely fine series," not a poor one but "anticlimactic," thinking the previous book "would have made an appropriate conclusion to the Underground World saga, save for a few loose ends." While these are resolved in Eric of Zanthodon, he deems "176 pages ... about 100 too many for this purpose."
