= Darya of the Bronze Age =

1981 novel by Lin Carter

- Cover of first edition
- Author: Lin Carter
- Illustrator: Josh Kirby
- Cover artist: Josh Kirby
- Language: English
- Series: Zanthodon
- Genre: Science fiction
- Publisher: DAW Books
- Publication date: 1981
- Publication place: United States
- Media type: Print (Paperback)
- Pages: 173
- ISBN: 0-87997-655-1
- OCLC: 08107150
- LC Class: PS3553.A7823 D3 1981
- Preceded by: Hurok of the Stone Age
- Followed by: Eric of Zanthodon

Darya of the Bronze Age is a science fiction novel by American writer Lin Carter, the fourth in his series about the fictional "Hollow Earth" land of Zanthodon. It was first published in paperback by DAW Books in September 1981, with an ebook edition following from Gateway/Orion in October 2018. It was also gathered together with the other volumes in the series into the omnibus ebook collection The Zanthodon Megapack (Wildside Press, 2014).

== Plot summary ==
Zanthodon is envisioned as an immense circular cavern five hundred miles wide, one hundred miles beneath the Sahara Desert, a refugium preserving various prehistoric faunas and antique human cultures that have found their way into it throughout the ages.

The story's events occur at the same time as those of the previous book, but follows the adventures of series heroine Darya, who has been separated from the other main characters. Having been kidnapped again by the corsair Kairadine, Prince of El-Cazar, a fortified island on the Northern Seas. Darya is ultimately saved when her father King Garth of Sothar leads their people in an invasion of El Cazar. Returning to the mainland of Zanthodon, they link up with King Tharn's Thandarians in the wake of their defeat of the combined forces of the corsairs and the Minoans of Zaar. Darya and her lover, explorer Eric Carstairs, are reunited, while the disarmed pirates and Zaarians are dispatched back to their own realms. Kairadine, true to character, abducts the Zaarian empress Zarys on the way.

== Reception ==
Robert M. Price finds the book and series "not without their charming moments," but also sees in them "clear evidence of Lin Carter's increasing carelessness as a writer," exhibiting "an increasing tendency toward self-contradiction and incoherent conception—a greater sloppiness coupled with an exhaustion of imagination."

Steve Servello, writing in Erbzine, is "a bit disappointed" in the book for some "lack of consistency" and "un-Burroughs-like sexuality," and views the climactic battle as "won far too easily in a contrived manner."

The novel was also reviewed by Charles Platt in The Patchin Review no. 3, January 1982.
