= Kesrick =

1982 novel by Lin Carter

- Cover of first edition
- Author: Lin Carter
- Cover artist: Keith Stillwagon
- Language: English
- Series: Terra Magica
- Genre: Fantasy
- Publisher: DAW Books
- Publication date: 1982
- Publication place: United States
- Media type: Print (Paperback)
- Pages: 176
- ISBN: 0-87997-779-5
- OCLC: 09024226
- Dewey Decimal: 813.54 .C246k
- LC Class: PS3553.A7823 K48 1982
- Followed by: Dragonrouge

Kesrick: An Adult Fantasy is a fantasy novel by American writer Lin Carter, the first in his series about the fictional "Flat Earth" of Terra Magica. It was first published in paperback by DAW Books in November 1982. A trade paperback edition was published by Wildside Press in February 2001, with an ebook edition following from Gateway/Orion in March 2020. It has also been translated into Italian.

== Plot summary ==
The novel's setting of Terra Magica is "the world as imagined by Dark Age European geographers and bestiary-writers," envisioned as one that "actually exists as a world parallel to our own. There magic works, hippogryphs and mantichores roam free, the earth is flat, paynims worship Termagant, and there is no Western Hemisphere."

The warrior Sir Kesrick of Dragonrouge seeks the purloined pommel stone of the sword Dastagard, which entails finding a wizard who intends to kill him in order to forestall this fate. His journey ranges widely through Terra Magica, and on his quest he encounters various menaces and perils while accumulating a number of allies and companions.

Chapter notes at the end of the book reference the sources in earlier fantasy literature of various creatures and character and place names used by the author.

== Sources ==
Carter "admits to having got the idea for the [Terra Magica series] from 'Thackeray's delightful treatise, The Rose and the Ring, a splendid spoof of fairy tales,'" with "nods to other fantasy classics as well," including Baum's The Wonderful Wizard of Oz, Cabell's The High Place, Beckford's Vathek, and Vance's The Dying Earth.

== Reception ==
Don Strachan in the Los Angeles Times finds the book's quest tale "gloriously overwritten," with "[t]he playful tone of its mock heroics prevent[ing] us from taking them too seriously." He highlights Terra Magica's "world teeming with ensorcelled blades and enchanted gardens, fair princesses who 'scorn any proffer of raiment,' brisket-of-sea-serpent dinners and fortuitous chance occurrences 'which are the delight, as they are often the salvation of the authors of mere fiction.'"

Robert M. Price, viewing such features more negatively, feels "[a]ll the faults of [Carter's] Gondwane and Green Star books are collected here. The humor is broader and more ham-handed than ever. ... Or at least it's supposed to be. ... I suspect that most [readers] will find it growing a bit thin before arriving at the end of several volumes of it." While conceding the series is intended as a parody or spoof, he notes "[t]here are some things, many things, from which [such] does not exempt a writer," including repetitiveness, failure to think things through in advance, poor continuity that "credit[s] exploits from ... previous book[s] to the wrong character," and an "intrusively and self-consciously cute" authorial voice. Price also observes that the protagonists, supposedly warriors, "scarcely ever lift a sword;" indeed, "[t]here is almost no fighting, only a series of perils and escapes, an endless chain of rescues by magicians, fairy godmothers, flying carpets, wishing rings, etc."
