= Callipygia =

1988 novel by Lin Carter

- Cover of first edition
- Author: Lin Carter
- Cover artist: Walter Velez
- Language: English
- Series: Terra Magica
- Genre: Fantasy
- Publisher: DAW Books
- Publication date: 1988
- Publication place: United States
- Media type: Print (Paperback)
- Pages: 252
- ISBN: 0-88677-262-1
- OCLC: 17528374
- Dewey Decimal: 813.54 .C246c
- LC Class: PR6039.O32 C34 1988
- Preceded by: Mandricardo

Callipygia: Further Adventures in Terra Magica is a fantasy novel by American writer Lin Carter, the fourth and last in his series about the fictional "Flat Earth" of Terra Magica. It was first published in paperback by DAW Books in February 1988. A trade paperback edition was published by Wildside Press in 2002, with an ebook edition following from Gateway/Orion in January 2020.

== Plot summary ==
The novel's setting of Terra Magica is "the world as imagined by Dark Age European geographers and bestiary-writers," envisioned as one that "actually exists as a world parallel to our own. There magic works, hippogryphs and mantichores roam free, the earth is flat, paynims worship Termagant, and there is no Western Hemisphere."

Bickering lovers Callipygia the Amazon and Prince Mandricardo of Tartary (descendant of the famous one) continue their quest through Terra Magica, seeking their way home to their happily ever after amid the perils of the fabled lands they traverse. Finding themselves trapped on a flying island none have ever escaped, they are launched into new adventures into far-distant realms, involving magic, menace, a wishing ring and an ogre's wrath.

Again, chapter notes at the end of the book reference the sources in earlier fantasy literature of various creatures and character and place names used by the author.

== Sources ==
Carter "admits to having got the idea for the [Terra Magica series] from 'Thackeray's delightful treatise, The Rose and the Ring, a splendid spoof of fairy tales,'" with "nods to other fantasy classics as well," including Baum's The Wonderful Wizard of Oz, Cabell's The High Place, Beckford's Vathek, and Vance's The Dying Earth.

== Reception ==
Robert M. Price, writes "[a]ll the faults of [Carter's] Gondwane and Green Star books are collected here. The humor is broader and more ham-handed than ever. ... Or at least it's supposed to be. ... I suspect that most [readers] will find it growing a bit thin before arriving at the end of several volumes of it." While conceding the series is intended as a parody or spoof, he notes "[t]here are some things, many things, from which [such] does not exempt a writer," including repetitiveness, failure to think things through in advance, poor continuity that "credit[s] exploits from ... previous book[s] to the wrong character," and an "intrusively and self-consciously cute" authorial voice. Price also observes that the protagonists, supposedly warriors, "scarcely ever lift a sword;" indeed, "[t]here is almost no fighting, only a series of perils and escapes, an endless chain of rescues by magicians, fairy godmothers, flying carpets, wishing rings, etc."
