= Journey to the Underground World =

1979 science fantasy novel by Lin Carter

- Cover of first edition
- Author: Lin Carter
- Cover artist: Josh Kirby
- Language: English
- Series: Zanthodon
- Genre: Science fiction
- Publisher: DAW Books
- Publication date: 1979
- Publication place: United States
- Media type: Print (Paperback)
- Pages: 175
- ISBN: 0-87997-499-0
- OCLC: 05875197
- LC Class: PS3553.A7823 J68 1979
- Followed by: Zanthodon

Journey to the Underground World is a science fiction novel by American writer Lin Carter, the first in his series about the fictional "Hollow Earth" land of Zanthodon. It was first published in paperback by DAW Books in November 1979, with an ebook edition following from Gateway/Orion in August 2018. It was also gathered together with the other volumes in the series into the omnibus ebook collection The Zanthodon Megapack (Wildside Press, 2014).

== Plot summary ==
Zanthodon is envisioned as an immense circular cavern five hundred miles wide, one hundred miles beneath the Sahara Desert, a refugium preserving various prehistoric faunas and antique human cultures that have found their way into it throughout the ages.

When Professor Percival P. Potter, who has discovered an entrance to Zanthodon, is saved by adventurer Eric Carstairs from thugs in Port Said, Egypt, the two team up to explore the legendary realm. Traveling by helicopter, they descend into the subterranean world through a volcanic tunnel, only to crash when they reach their destination. They are now effectively marooned in Zanthodon.

After witnessing a conflict between a triceratops and a mammoth they are captured and enslaved by Neanderthals together with a number of native humans. These include Darya, daughter of a tribal king, Jorn, a hunter, and Fumio, a villainous chieftain. Eric leads a slave revolt, freeing the others, but is himself retaken. On the plus side, he saves the life of Hurok, one of his captors, thus befriending him. Meanwhile, Potter and the rest of the freed captives are attacked by corsairs.

The author provides as an appendix "A Stone Age Glossary" at the end of the book, enumerating the various prehistoric animals used, together with their supposed native names.

== Sources ==
Previous fictional underground and lost worlds are referenced by the characters in the book, including those of Jules Verne (Journey to the Center of the Earth), Edgar Rice Burroughs (Pellucidar), Arthur Conan Doyle (The Lost World), and even King Kong (Skull Island), highlighting the author's literary debt to these precursors.

== Reception ==
Robert M. Price characterizes the book and series as a homage to Burroughs's inner world novels; noting that "Zanthodon is first and foremost Pellucidar," with Carstairs "simply David Innes reincarnated," and Potter "a sillier version of inventor Abner Perry." But he finds their characters "well-drawn," finding Carstairs's "narrative voice well fits his characterization as a hard-bitten soldier-of-fortune." and Potter "a bit of a fraud, but with obvious erudition, a kind of academic jack-of-all-trades [who] knows whatever you need to know in a tight spot." The "hard-boiled quality ... alas, begins to fade as the action gets underway ... [y]et this is not simply a matter of Carter's inability to sustain a richer narrative texture [but] is inherent in the subject matter; if Raymond Chandler sent Philip Marlow to Pellucidar, he wouldn't be narrating it like he does The Long Goodbye." Price regards as "especially effective the idea that Potter initially theorizes the existence of Zanthodon from comparing various eastern myths of the netherworld ... often located to the west," supposing "they preserved the memory of an actual underground world filled with fearsome dangers[.]" Nonetheless, "[t]hough the Zanthodon books are not without their charming moments," Price also finds in them "clear evidence of Lin Carter's increasing carelessness as a writer," exhibiting "an increasing tendency toward self-contradiction and incoherent conception—a greater sloppiness coupled with an exhaustion of imagination."
