= The Volcano Ogre =

1976 novel by Lin Carter

- Cover of first edition
- Author: Lin Carter
- Cover artist: Tim Lewis
- Language: English
- Series: Zarkon series
- Genre: Science fiction
- Publisher: Doubleday
- Publication date: 1976
- Publication place: United States
- Media type: Print (hardcover)
- Pages: xii, 177
- ISBN: 0-385-08807-8
- Preceded by: Invisible Death
- Followed by: The Earth-Shaker

The Volcano Ogre is a science fiction novel by American writer Lin Carter, the third his "Zarkon, Lord of the Unknown" series. It was first published in hardcover by Doubleday in 1976, with a paperback edition following from Popular Library in November 1978. It was reissued by Wildside Press in 1999. An ebook edition was issued by Thunderchild Publishing in October 2017.

== Summary ==
Prince Zarkon and his Omega Crew investigate a legendary island monster on the South Pacific atoll of Rangatoa, a flaming creature that rises from the mouth of a living volcano to spread terror and death. To learn the truth about the menace, they must descend into its fiery lair deep within the bowels of the Earth.

== Reception ==
Robert M. Price characterizes the Zarkon series as "five delightful novels ... Lin Carter's loving homage to Doc Savage and his creator Lester Dent." They celebrate "'the gloriously fourth-rate,' the pulps, radio, comics, and movies he loved as a kid." He notes that "[t]he novels manage quite successfully to walk the tightrope between salute and parody," and "the humor never seems to impede or undermine the action." While "[i]t is not difficult to pick out a flaw here and there" and the series is "not entirely free from Carter's later-career sloppiness ... on the whole these books are vastly superior to much of what else he was writing during the same period. The Zarkon novels all command a crisp, snappy prose, sometimes reminiscent of Lester Dent's."

The book was also reviewed by Don D'Ammassa in Delap's F & SF Review, August 1976, and Frederick Patten in Science Fiction & Fantasy Book Review, May 1979.

== Relationship to other works ==
The setting of the atoll of Rangatoa was lifted by the author from the 1933 Doc Savage novel Pirate of the Pacific. Carter's introduction claims the lava-devil is an actual regional legend, but cites as authority the fictional work Polynesian Mythology by Harold Hadley Copeland (protagonist of his own Cthulhu Mythos story "The Dweller in the Tomb."
