= Sandalwood and Jade =

1951 collection of poems by Lin Carter

- Cover
- Author: Lin Carter
- Illustrator: Lin Carter
- Cover artist: Lin Carter
- Language: English
- Genre: poetry
- Publisher: The Sign of the Centaur
- Publication date: 1951
- Publication place: United States
- Media type: Print
- Pages: 24
- OCLC: 52064646
- Followed by: Galleon of Dream

Sandalwood and Jade: Poems of the Exotic and the Strange is a poetry collection written and illustrated by Lin Carter. The book was released in paperback by The Sign of the Centaur in 1951. in a limited edition of 100 copies.

== Background ==
Carter lists his inspirations as Robert E. Howard, Clark Ashton Smith, John Milton, Percy Bysshe Shelley, John Keats, Samuel Taylor Coleridge, Oscar Wilde, Li Po, Tu Fu, Po Chu-I, Hafiz, Omar Khayyam, Chaures, Charles Baudelaire, Edgar Allan Poe, and Don Blanding.

== Summary ==
The collection consists of thirty poems, illustrated and with a foreword by the author. A one page credits section follows the last poem.

== Contents ==
- "Foreword"
- "Contents"
- "Couplet"
- "Pirate Gold"
- "The Star-Gazer"
- "The Night Kings"
- "Mars" (from Spaceteer #2, Mar./Apr. 1948)
- "The Arabian Nights"
- "Beyond the Gates of Dream"
- "The Wizard Isle" (from Challenge #1, Sum. 1950)
- "Of the Princess Liv-Shang"
- "The Gods Looked Down"
- "The Lotus-Eater" (from The Fanscient #12, Sum. 1950)
- "The Splendor in a Dream"
- "The Fantast" (from Gorgon v.2, no.3, Mar. 1949)
- "To Lord Dunsany"
- "Pan" (from Dream Quest #6, Jul. 1948)
- "Shard" (from Loki #1, Spr. 1948, and Palmetto and Pine Literary Supplement #1, 1947)
- "Walker on the Wind" (from The St. Petersburg Times, Apr. 1948)
- "Nightwind" (from Triton #4, 1949)
- "When Solomon Was King"
- "The Jungle-Song"
- "Babylon"
- "The Song of Laine the Dreamer" (from Scientififantasy, 1949)
- "Kooribaal" (from Scientifantasy #4, Sum. 1949)
- "To a Chinese Maiden"
- "The Book of Djinns"
- "Once in Fabled Grandeur"
- "Wanderlust"
- "In an Oriental Twilight"
- "Song of the Sorcerer" (from Challenge #2, Fall 1950)
- "The Golden City" (from Loki #1, Spr. 1948, and Palmetto and Pine Literary Supplement #2, 1948)
- "A Publishing History"

== Recognition ==
"Walker on the Wind" was the winner of the '48 Elizabeth Buchtenkirk Award. "Nightwind" and "The Golden City" were winners of 1948 St. Petersburg Poetry League Awards.
