= Hurok of the Stone Age =

1981 novel by Lin Carter

- Cover of first edition
- Author: Lin Carter
- Illustrator: Josh Kirby
- Cover artist: Josh Kirby
- Language: English
- Series: Zanthodon
- Genre: Science fiction
- Publisher: DAW Books
- Publication date: 1981
- Publication place: United States
- Media type: Print (Paperback)
- Pages: 192
- ISBN: 0-87997-597-0
- OCLC: 07338926
- LC Class: PS3553.A7823 H87 1981
- Preceded by: Zanthodon
- Followed by: Darya of the Bronze Age

Hurok of the Stone Age is a science fiction novel by American writer Lin Carter, the third in his series about the fictional "Hollow Earth" land of Zanthodon. It was first published in paperback by DAW Books in February 1981, with an ebook edition following from Gateway/Orion in October 2018. It was also gathered together with the other volumes in the series into the omnibus ebook collection The Zanthodon Megapack (Wildside Press, 2014).

== Plot summary ==
Zanthodon is envisioned as an immense circular cavern five hundred miles wide, one hundred miles beneath the Sahara Desert, a refugium preserving various prehistoric faunas and antique human cultures that have found their way into it throughout the ages.

The story follows the adventures of several of the series's protagonists, who were split up at the end of the previous book. Eric Carstairs and Professor Potter, the explorers from the surface world, have been taken captive by the Tyrannosaurus-worshipping Minoans of the Scarlet City of Zaar on the Lugar-Jad, a mountain-girded inland sea. Carstairs's Neanderthal comrade Hurok and the native warrior Garth of Sothar search for them and the latter's daughter Yualla. Meanwhile, Tharn seeks heroine Darya after both were carried off by Thakdols. Much of the action takes place in Zaar, whose seductive empress Zarys displaces an unhealthy interest in Eric. In the end all, thanks to Hurok, are rescued aside from Darya, last seen imprisoned on a ship bound for the Barbary Pirate Haven of El Cazar.

== Reception ==
Rosemary Herbert in Library Journal writes that the novel "carries on Carter's reputation for clean-cut thrillers" and that "[t]he three or more story lines of this work are braided well, [though] Carter's use of a telepathic circlet cheapens the heroism."

Robert M. Price finds the book and series "not without their charming moments," but also sees in them "clear evidence of Lin Carter's increasing carelessness as a writer," exhibiting "an increasing tendency toward self-contradiction and incoherent conception—a greater sloppiness coupled with an exhaustion of imagination."
