= Swordsmen and Supermen =

American anonymously edited anthology

- Cover of Swordsmen and Supermen
- Author: Robert E. Howard and others
- Cover artist: Virgil Finlay
- Language: English
- Series: Time-Lost series
- Genre: Fantasy
- Publisher: Centaur Press
- Publication date: 1972
- Publication place: United States
- Media type: Print (paperback)
- Pages: 120
- ISBN: 0-87818-007-9
- OCLC: 12820329

Swordsmen and Supermen is an American anonymously edited anthology of fantasy stories by Robert E. Howard and others, with a cover by Virgil Finlay. It was first published in paperback by Centaur Press in February 1972. The anonymous editor has been identified by bibliographers Jack L. Chalker and Mark Owings and by critic Roger C. Schlobin as the publisher, Donald M. Grant.

The book collects five novelettes and short stories by various fantasy authors, with a general introductory note and introductory notes on the authors and stories prefacing each story. The stories are "swashbuckling fantastic yarns" both from the pulp era of the 1920s and 1930s and the period in which the book was published.

== Contents ==
- "Meet Cap'n Kidd" (Robert E. Howard)
- "The Death of a Hero" (Jean d'Esme)
- "Wings of Y'vrn" (Darrel Crombie)
- "The Slave of Marathon" (Arthur D. Howden Smith)
- "How Sargoth Lay Siege to Zaremm" (Lin Carter)

== Reception ==
The anthology has been characterized by critic Roger C. Schlobin as "an outstanding group of five new and reprinted examples of sword and sorcery." He considers "the Crombie tale, concerning a questing shape-changer ... a particular treat."
