= Zanthodon =

1980 novel by Lin Carter

- Cover of first edition
- Author: Lin Carter
- Illustrator: Thomas Kidd
- Cover artist: Thomas Kidd
- Language: English
- Series: Zanthodon
- Genre: Science fiction
- Publisher: DAW Books
- Publication date: 1979
- Publication place: United States
- Media type: Print (Paperback)
- Pages: 188
- ISBN: 0-87997-543-1
- OCLC: 06706071
- LC Class: PS3553.A7823 Z12 1980
- Preceded by: Journey to the Underground World
- Followed by: Hurok of the Stone Age

Zanthodon is a science fiction novel by American writer Lin Carter, the second in his series about the fictional "Hollow Earth" land of Zanthodon. It was first published in paperback by DAW Books in June 1980, with an ebook edition following from Gateway/Orion in October 2018. It was also gathered together with the other volumes in the series into the omnibus ebook collection The Zanthodon Megapack (Wildside Press, 2014).

== Plot summary ==
Zanthodon is envisioned as an immense circular cavern five hundred miles wide, one hundred miles beneath the Sahara Desert, a refugium preserving various prehistoric faunas and antique human cultures that have found their way into it throughout the ages.

As the novel opens, protagonist Eric Carstairs, Professor Potter, and their Zanthodonian companions have been separated, and must separately face the menaces of Kairadine Redbeard, corsair captain of the Red Witch, the dwarfish Gorpaks, the Gorpaks' leech-like masters the Sluagghs, and the Neanderthal Drugars. Overcoming these various antagonists, the heroes are reunited in the end only to be taken captive by the Minoans of Zar, while Achmed the Moor makes off with Eric's love interest Darya.

The author provides as an afterword "The People of Zanthodon" at the end of the book, enumerating the various characters and groups appearing therein.

== Sources ==
Previous fictional underground and lost worlds are referenced by the characters in the preceding book, Journey to the Underground World, including those of Jules Verne (Journey to the Center of the Earth), Edgar Rice Burroughs (Pellucidar), Arthur Conan Doyle (The Lost World), and even King Kong (Skull Island), highlighting the author's literary debt to these precursors.

== Reception ==
Robert M. Price finds the book and series "not without their charming moments," but also sees in them "clear evidence of Lin Carter's increasing carelessness as a writer," exhibiting "an increasing tendency toward self-contradiction and incoherent conception—a greater sloppiness coupled with an exhaustion of imagination."
