= The Man Who Loved Mars =

1973 novel by Lin Carter

- Cover of first edition
- Author: Lin Carter
- Cover artist: Paul Lehr
- Language: English
- Series: The Mysteries of Mars
- Genre: Science fantasy
- Publisher: Fawcett Gold Medal
- Publication date: 1973
- Publication place: United States
- Media type: Print (Paperback)
- Pages: 157
- OCLC: 872633717
- Dewey Decimal: 813.54 23
- LC Class: PS3553 .A7823
- Preceded by: Down to a Sunless Sea

The Man Who Loved Mars is a science fantasy novel by American writer Lin Carter, the first in his Edgar Rice Burroughs- and Leigh Brackett-inspired series The Mysteries of Mars. It was first published in paperback by Fawcett Gold Medal in March 1973. The first British edition was published in hardcover by White Lion in August of the same year. It was reissued by Wildside Press in December 1999. The novel has also been translated into German.

In writing the series, Carter deliberately depicted a Mars very different from that shown in increasingly detailed scientific research of Mars during the 20th Century; specifically, that scientists doubt that any kind of life can be found there. This makes the series more of a fantasy than a science fiction.

== Plot summary ==
Mars, a world with a culture ages older than that of Earth, is a dying world, and has been in decline for eons. By the twenty-second century it has become a colony of the younger civilization of Earth, its natives oppressed by the rapacious Colonial Authority. Some of the newcomers are sympathetic to the natives, however, notably Ivo Tengren, who befriended the last of the titular high kings of Mars before the latter's demise. Inheriting from him both the crown and the responsibility to champion its people, Ivo led a doomed revolt against the CA, only to see it crushed and his Martian lover murdered. He himself has been deported back to Earth for his temerity and forbidden ever to return to Mars.

In exile, Tengren spends his days idly in drink and dreams until one Dr. Josip Keresny approaches him. Keresny plans an expedition to locate the lost Martian city of Ilionis, legendary "Gateway to the Gods," and offers Ivo illicit passage back to the Red Planet in return for serving as guide and placating the Martians. Hopeless and passive, Ivo is not the man he once was; nonetheless, he leaps at the chance.

The expedition proceeds, though tensions arise as Tengren develops an attraction to Keresny's granddaughter Ilsa and a hostile rivalry with pilot Konstantin Bolgov. The party also faces hostility from the Martians, who tolerate it only on account of their "king," even as they retain suspicions of him due to the debacle he led them through and his status as an Earthman. Eventually Ilionis is found. It indeed proves a gateway, to a vast system of caverns and relics of an alien technology older than anything remembered by the Martians.

Ultimately the cave system leads the explorers to the resting place of the Timeless Ones, a trio of alien survivors of the destroyed planet whose remains are now the asteroid belt. Awakened, they reveal themselves as the beings who guided the ancestors of both Martians and Earthlings on the path to sentience.

Bolgov, secretly an agent of the CA, attempts to destroy the aliens lest they free the Martians, but is thwarted. The Timeless Ones then pronounce sentence on the ruling Earthlings; for their crimes, all must leave Mars. Their vast mental powers give them the means to enforce this edict. The detached Tengren is satisfied with the outcome until he realizes the sentence includes him, at which point he belatedly speaks up for the more benignly inclined humans. The Timeless Ones grant the exception, giving him and Ilsa the right to remain and help rebuild Martian society.

== Chronology ==
This story was the first published in the series, preceding The Valley Where Time Stood Still, but in terms of events it comes last, following Down to a Sunless Sea.

== Reception ==
Lester Del Rey writes "This is by all odds the best showcase of Carter's writing I have seen. For this type of story, his people move naturally. The color he evolves for his world is traditional, but he has made it very much his own. And the book hangs together. It's Carter's best to date, in my opinion, and I heartily recommend it."

Den Valdron, assessing the series in ERBzine, calls the book "[t]he best of the series," and its protagonist "fascinating ... a thoughtful but true successor to John Carter." He feels "[t]here’s something a little extra in his Martian novels that puts them at the upper registers of Carter’s work," and "commend[s] them to the reader."

J. G. Huckenpohler, also writing in ERBzine, rated the series "among my favorites" of Carter's stories, considering this book "the best of the lot" in the series, and the series as a whole to "show more originality" than Carter's Zanthodon and Callisto books.
