= Down to a Sunless Sea (Carter novel) =

1984 novel by Lin Carter

- Cover of first edition
- Author: Lin Carter
- Cover artist: Ken W. Kelly
- Language: English
- Series: The Mysteries of Mars
- Genre: Science fantasy
- Publisher: DAW Books
- Publication date: 1984
- Publication place: United States
- Media type: Print (paperback)
- Pages: 174
- ISBN: 0-87997-937-2
- OCLC: 11049582
- Dewey Decimal: 813.54
- LC Class: PS3553.A7823D68 1984
- Preceded by: The City Outside the World
- Followed by: The Man Who Loved Mars

Down to a Sunless Sea is a science fantasy novel by American writer Lin Carter, the fourth in his Edgar Rice Burroughs- and Leigh Brackett-inspired series The Mysteries of Mars. It was first published in paperback by DAW Books in June 1984 and reissued in hardcover and trade paperback by Wildside Press in February 2008.

The title of the book is taken from a line of the poem Kubla Khan by Samuel Taylor Coleridge. David Graham wrote a post-apocalyptic novel with the same title (ISBN 0-7091-7836-0), also derived from the same Coleridge poem.

== Plot summary ==
Mars, a world with a culture ages older than that of Earth, is a dying world, and has been in decline for eons. By the twenty-second century it has become a colony of the younger civilization of Earth, its natives oppressed by the rapacious Colonial Authority.

In a ruined city, Terran outlaw and prospector Jim Brant discovers two native women who have been staked out and left to die for the offense of loving each other. He frees the couple, named Zuarra and Suoli. Their affection has not survived the experience, as Suoli betrayed cowardice when left to their fate, in contrast to the stoic Zuarra.

The ill-sorted trio soon encounters other wanderers in the waste, Terran archeologist Will Harbin and his native guide Agila, a strong figure to whom the dependent Suoli soon attaches herself. This brings new complications, as Agila is a fugitive from the bandit chief Tuan, from whom he stole an ancient disc engraved with a treasure map.

The combined party follows the map to a cave containing a stairwell descending into unknown depths. Exploring to see where it leads, they discover a huge cavern containing an underground sea. They have been trailed, however, by Tuan's bandits, who capture them and propose to burn Agila alive. The operation is interrupted by children riding giant dragonflies, which carry everyone away to their base, the floating raft-city of Zhar.

The Zharians are a nation of innocents, primitive but possessed of strong psychic powers. Agila and Suoli, taking advantage of their hosts' seeming weakness, attempt to rob the sea people's prince Azuri, whom they end up killing. Shocked and offended, the remaining Zharians demonstrate their power by psychically suffocating the two and compelling the rest of the outsiders to reconcile and return to the surface.

Back in the Martian wastes, Brant's party and Tuan's bandits all part ways. Brant and Zuarra, now an item, intend to wed.

== Chronology ==
This story was the fifth published in the series, after The City Outside the World, but in terms of events it comes fourth, between The City Outside the World and The Man Who Loved Mars.

== Reception ==
Den Valdron, assessing the series in ERBzine, rates the book as the least interesting of the series, "but each has their [sic] particular strengths." Over all, he feels "[t]here’s something a little extra in his Martian novels that puts them at the upper registers of Carter’s work," and "commend[s] them to the reader."

J. G. Huckenpohler, also writing in ERBzine, rated the series "among my favorites" of Carter's stories, "show[ing] more originality" than Carter's Zanthodon and Callisto books. Nonetheless, he "found them to be uneven," growing "increasingly repetitious, the last two [including "Sea"] especially." He considers it "the weakest and most derivative of the four [novels], drawing plot elements from Verne, Burroughs, and Brackett, among others," but credits it "for blending them in an imaginative way." It shares what he identifies as the sequence's standard plot: "[a] Terran outlaw, an older Dok-i-tar, a Martian sidekick, originally an enemy, and a Martian girl find a lost city known only to the oldest legends of the Martians, unlock its secrets, and either remain as its rulers or escape to begin a new life."

The novel was also reviewed by Don D'Ammassa in Science Fiction Chronicle no. 60, September 1984, and William M. Schuyler, Jr. in Fantasy Review, October 1984.
