= Outworlder =

1971 novel by Lin Carter

- Cover from first edition
- Author: Lin Carter
- Cover artist: Behan
- Language: English
- Series: History of the Great Imperium
- Genre: Science fiction
- Publisher: Lancer Books
- Publication date: 1971
- Publication place: United States
- Media type: Print (paperback)
- Pages: 176
- OCLC: 3061707
- Preceded by: Star Rogue

Outworlder is a science fiction novel by American writer Lin Carter, the third in his History of the Great Imperium series. It was first published in paperback by Lancer Books in January 1971. The first British edition was issued by Gateway/Orion (as an ebook) in December 2019. The book has also appeared in German translation.

== Plot summary ==
Reluctant protagonist Morgan, an exile from the Imperium, finds himself drawn into a seemingly magical quest to save a planet from a dire threat from the dark magicians of Bargelix.

== Relation to other works ==
Carter projected his History of the Great Imperium as a series of eight to twelve stand-alone novels collectively covering thousands of years of an invented future history of the galaxy. Of these, only three, The Man Without a Planet (1966), Star Rogue (1970), and Outworlder (1971) were published, though critic John Clute includes two additional Carter science fiction novels, The Star Magicians (1966) and Tower of the Medusa (1969) in the series. According to a note by the author in the back of the present volume, while issued last, is chronologically the earliest of the three published works, preceding The Man Without a Planet.

== Reception ==
John Clute, briefly assessing Carter's science fiction corpus, notes that his "History of the Great Imperium sequence ... adheres moderately closely to sf protocols and to the 'feel' of sf."

The novel was reviewed by Fred Patten in Locus no. 87, June 25, 1971, and Chris Lowder in Shadow, September 1971.
