= Star Rogue =

1970 novel by Lin Carter

- Cover from first edition
- Author: Lin Carter
- Language: English
- Series: History of the Great Imperium
- Genre: Science fiction
- Publisher: Lancer Books
- Publication date: 1970
- Publication place: United States
- Media type: Print (paperback)
- Pages: 190
- OCLC: 3075841
- Preceded by: The Man Without a Planet
- Followed by: Outworlder

Star Rogue is a science fiction novel by American writer Lin Carter, the second in his History of the Great Imperium series. It was first published in paperback by Lancer Books in 1970, and was reissued in hardcover and trade paperback by Wildside Press in February 2008. The first British edition was issued by Gateway/Orion (as an ebook) in January 2020. The book has also appeared in German translation.

== Plot summary ==
Star Rogue is set in the Year 4114 of the Great Imperium (A.D. 7177). It follows Saul Everest, an immortal who has served as the Imperium's secret guardian throughout the ages, having set up the secret society known as Citadel for that purpose. When hints of a disturbance at the edge of the galaxy reach him, he emerges from seclusion to address it. He soon realizes that despite the steps he has taken to conceal the existence of both himself and Citadel, some unknown foe is hunting him and seeking to infiltrate the society. His mission takes him through action-filled adventures on strange worlds and starship battles in space as he works to unravel the mystery.

== Relation to other works ==
Carter projected his History of the Great Imperium as a series of eight to twelve stand-alone novels collectively covering thousands of years of an invented future history of the galaxy. Of these, only three, The Man Without a Planet (1966), Star Rogue (1970), and Outworlder (1971) were published, though critic John Clute includes two additional Carter science fiction novels, The Star Magicians (1966) and Tower of the Medusa (1969) in the series.

== Reception ==
John Clute, briefly assessing Carter's science fiction corpus, notes that his "History of the Great Imperium sequence ... adheres moderately closely to sf protocols and to the 'feel' of sf."

The novel was reviewed by Charles N. Brown in Locus no. 64, Sep. 30, 1970, James R. Newton in Son of the WSFA Journal no. 24, 1971, and Penny Tesarek in Paperback Fantastic, Volume 1: Science Fiction in 2022.
