= The Man Without a Planet =

1966 novel by Lin Carter

- Cover from first publication, in The; Man Without a Planet/Time to Live
- Author: Lin Carter
- Cover artist: Peter Michael
- Language: English
- Series: History of the Great Imperium
- Genre: Science fiction
- Publisher: Ace Books
- Publication date: 1966
- Publication place: United States
- Media type: Print (paperback)
- Pages: 113
- OCLC: 6215401
- Dewey Decimal: 813.6
- LC Class: PS3553.A7823
- Followed by: Star Rogue

The Man Without a Planet is a science fiction novel by American writer Lin Carter, the first in his History of the Great Imperium series. It was first published in paperback by Ace Books in December 1966 together with the unrelated John Rackham novel Time to Live as the "Ace Double" anthology, The Man Without a Planet/Time to Live. The anthology was reissued in trade paperback by Wildside Press in August 2018. The Carter work has since appeared in stand-alone editions from Moewig (in German translation) in January 1985 and Gateway/Orion (as an ebook) in May 2020.

== Plot summary ==
The Man Without a Planet is set in the Year 407 of the Great Imperium (A.D. 3468), "in the fifth year of the empery of Arban IV, of the House of Tridian." Raul Linton, late space navy commander and hero of the Third Imperial War, wanders the Inner Cluster of stars, disillusioned and seeking a new purpose. He is shadowed by Pertinax "the Snake," a spy of the Imperium Government convinced Linton is a traitor. Meanwhile Sharl of the Yellow Eyes seeks to recruit Linton into a scheme to restore the exiled Queen Innald of Valadon to her throne, which may make him a traitor in truth.

== Relation to other works ==
Carter projected his History of the Great Imperium as a series of eight to twelve stand-alone novels collectively covering thousands of years of an invented future history of the galaxy. Of these, only three, The Man Without a Planet (1966), Star Rogue (1970), and Outworlder (1971) were published, though critic John Clute includes two additional Carter science fiction novels, The Star Magicians (1966) and Tower of the Medusa (1969) in the series.

== Reception ==
John Clute, briefly assessing Carter's science fiction corpus, notes that his "History of the Great Imperium sequence ... adheres moderately closely to sf protocols and to the 'feel' of sf."
