= The Book of Ptath =

1943 novel by A.E. van Vogt

- Dust-jacket from the first edition
- Author: A. E. van Vogt
- Illustrator: A. J. Donnell
- Cover artist: A. J. Donnell
- Language: English
- Genre: Science fiction,Fantasy
- Publisher: Fantasy Press
- Publication date: 1947
- Publication place: United States
- Media type: Print (Hardback)
- Pages: 221
- OCLC: 1289935

The Book of Ptath is a science fiction (or perhaps fantasy) novel by Canadian-American writer A. E. van Vogt. It was first published in book form in 1947 by Fantasy Press in an edition of 3,021 copies. The novel was originally serialized in the magazine Unknown in October 1943. The book has also appeared under the titles Two Hundred Million A.D. and Ptath.

== Plot summary ==
Ptath is a god from Earth's far future when the landmasses have rejoined to form a single super-continent, now called Gonwonlane. Ptath ruled this planetary nation with his two goddess-wives; all of them having divine powers, his fueled by the prayers of women, the goddesses's from Ptath himself.

Before the start of the novel, Ptath had chosen to journey back in time and incarnate as a series of mortals from Earth's history. While he is absent, one of his goddess-wives tries to usurp his power by imprisoning the other goddess-wife and forbidding women from praying, thus removing Ptath from his power source while keeping her own. She contrives to bring Ptath back to Gonwonlane before the completion of his journey, without his powers, and kill him. But he returns to Gonwonlane in his immortal body but with the mind of his most recent incarnation – a just deceased 20th century tank commander.

From Ptath's point of view, he was killed in his tank and then immediately woke up (naked, walking down a road) in the far future.

The story follows Ptath as he rescues his other wife, learns about his immortal body, mental powers, and makes war against his evil wife.

== Reception ==
Lin Carter ranked The Book of Ptath as van Vogt's "single best novel" and tried to convince him to write a sequel. R. D. Mullen, however, dismissed the novel, saying he saw no reason to include it in an SF library.

It is included as Number 62 in Michael Moorcock and James Cawthorn's Fantasy: The 100 Best Books.

== Sources ==
- Chalker, Jack L.; Mark Owings (1998). The Science-Fantasy Publishers: A Bibliographic History, 1923-1998. Westminster, MD and Baltimore: Mirage Press, Ltd. p. 235.
- Clute, John; Peter Nicholls (1995). The Encyclopedia of Science Fiction. New York: St. Martin's Griffin. p. 1269. ISBN 0-312-13486-X.
- Tuck, Donald H. (1978). The Encyclopedia of Science Fiction and Fantasy. Chicago: Advent. p. 431. ISBN 0-911682-22-8.
