= The Wizard of Zao =

1978 novel by Lin Carter

- cover of The Wizard of Zao
- Author: Lin Carter
- Cover artist: Carl Lundgren
- Language: English
- Series: The Chronicles of Kylix
- Genre: Sword and sorcery fantasy
- Publisher: DAW Books
- Publication date: 1978
- Publication place: United States
- Media type: Print (Paperback)
- Pages: 176
- ISBN: 0-87997-383-8
- Preceded by: The Quest of Kadji
- Followed by: Kellory the Warlock

The Wizard of Zao is a fantasy novel by American writer Lin Carter, the second book of the Chronicles of Kylix series. It was first published in paperback by DAW Books in June 1978.

== Plot ==
Each volume of the Chronicles of Kylix is set on a different world in the magical solar system of the fictional star Kylix in the constellation of the Unicorn. The system consists of the five planets Zao, Olymbris, Thoorana, Zephrondus and Gulzund. The Wizard of Zao takes place on Zao.

Oolb Votz, the titular wonder-working wizard, fat, green and full of himself, makes an unlikely hero, but nonetheless has a humorous romp of a quest he must undertake. He is accompanied on his journey by the 15-year-old Wild Girl Ooo, his newly purchased chela, who assists him as servant, apprentice and concubine. Strange beasts and stranger people are encountered along the way. The true identity of the wizard, a mystery in itself, is revealed in a surprise ending. The narrative is spiced with authorial asides and footnotes.

== Reception ==
Robert M. Price, while noting that The Wizard of Zao was "Carter's favorite among his own novels," judges the book "ingenious, but badly written, ... As in the sloppy Gondwane books, Carter lamely explains away various inconsistencies, or he claims to be guessing the answers, as if he, too, is merely a reader of his sources and cannot be any more consistent than they. [But w]hat is really unforgivable is the way Carter just chucks out all his critical canons for literary 'world-making' as set forth in Imaginary Worlds. Sword & Sorcery is supposed to be set in a pre-industrial era, yet here is Oolb Votz talking about 'enzymes' and 'blowing fuses.' ... Our narrator, too, is free in his comparisons of various things to a 'locomotive' or a 'dive bomber.' ... Perhaps he reasoned that the rules were different in a fantasy burlesque, but I cannot think him correct. If it's all right to have Chianti and locomotives, why bother setting the story on a fantasy world in the first place?"
