= Tower of the Medusa =

1969 novel by Lin Carter

- Cover from first publication, in Kar; Kaballa/Tower of the Medusa
- Author: Lin Carter
- Cover artist: Jeff Jones
- Language: English
- Series: Tales of the Near Stars
- Genre: Science fiction
- Publisher: Ace Books
- Publication date: 1969
- Publication place: United States
- Media type: Print (paperback)
- Pages: 106
- ISBN: 0-441-42900-9
- OCLC: 1702207
- Preceded by: Tower at the Edge of Time

Tower of the Medusa is a sword and planet science fiction novel by American writer Lin Carter, the third in his Tales of the Near Stars series. It was first published in paperback by Ace Books in November 1969 together with the unrelated George H. Smith novel Kar Kaballa as the "Ace Double" anthology, Kar Kaballa/Tower of the Medusa. The first stand-alone edition was issued in trade paperback and ebook by Wildside Press in February 2011. The first British edition was issued as an ebook by Gateway/Orion in November 2018.

== Plot summary ==
In the far future, when science has become indistinguishable from magic, Kirin, a thief dealing in precious relics, is forced to land on an alien world. After an attack by death dwarfs he finds himself involved in a quest to steal a magical gem from the Tower of the Medusa, crawling with guards and lethal traps, and reputedly impregnable. In an adventure replete with chases and battles, Kirin and his confederates must overcome the evil Witch Queen, a beautiful sorceress. Taken prisoner and held in her palace, he is aided by a captivating slave. After more fast paced action, events culminate in a battle highlighted by the intervention of ancient gods.

== Relation to other works ==
The Tales of the Near Stars series comprises this novel plus The Star Magicians (1966) and Tower at the Edge of Time (1968), all of which take place in the wake of the fall of the interstellar Carina Empire. Its collapse has left the civilization of the surviving planets in ruins, with some isolated and others reduced to barbarism. Their cultural diversity has produced an odd mix of advanced technology and seeming sorcery amid the inhabited worlds. Similarities in situation to Carter's History of the Great Imperium series have led critic John Clute to link this book and The Star Magicians to that sequence, though the Imperium books are usually considered to consist solely of three other novels, The Man Without a Planet (1966), Star Rogue (1970), and Outworlder (1971)

== Reception ==
The book was reviewed by Anthony R. Lewis in Locus no. 44, Dec. 17, 1969, and Paul Walker in Science Fiction Review, Jan. 1971.
