= Science Fiction Quarterly =

US pulp science fiction magazine

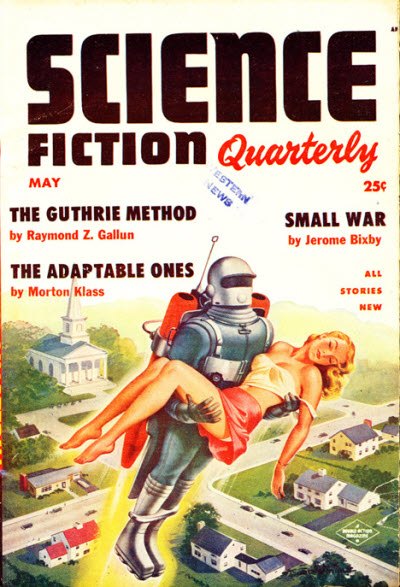
Cover of Science Fiction Quarterly, May 1954

Science Fiction Quarterly was an American pulp science fiction magazine that was published from 1940 to 1943 and again from 1951 to 1958. Charles Hornig served as editor for the first two issues; Robert A. W. Lowndes edited the remainder. Science Fiction Quarterly was launched by publisher Louis Silberkleit during a boom in science fiction magazines at the end of the 1930s. Silberkleit launched two other science fiction titles (Science Fiction and Future Fiction) at about the same time: all three ceased publication before the end of World War II, falling prey to slow sales and paper shortages. In 1950 and 1951, as the market improved, Silberkleit relaunched Future Fiction and Science Fiction Quarterly. By the time Science Fiction Quarterly ceased publication in 1958, it was the last surviving science fiction pulp magazine, all other survivors having changed to different formats.

Science Fiction Quarterly's policy was to reprint a novel in each issue as the lead story, and Silberkleit was able to obtain reprint rights to two early science fiction novels and several of Ray Cummings' books. Both Hornig and Lowndes were given minuscule budgets, and Hornig in particular had trouble finding good material to print. Lowndes did somewhat better, as he was able to call on his friends in the Futurians, a group of aspiring writers that included Isaac Asimov, James Blish, and Donald Wollheim. The second incarnation of the magazine also had a policy of running a lead novel, though in practice the lead stories were often well short of novel length. Among the better-known stories published by the magazine were "Second Dawn", by Arthur C. Clarke; "The Last Question", by Isaac Asimov; and "Common Time", by James Blish.

== Publishing history ==
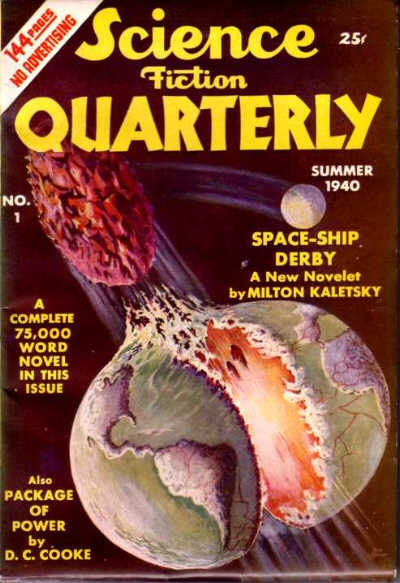
The first issue, dated Summer 1940; cover art by Jack Binder

Although science fiction (sf) had been published before the 1920s, it did not begin to coalesce into a separately marketed genre until the appearance in 1926 of Amazing Stories, a pulp magazine published by Hugo Gernsback. By the end of the 1930s, the field was booming. Louis Silberkleit, a publisher who had once worked for Gernsback, launched a pulp magazine in March 1939 titled Science Fiction, under his Blue Ribbon Magazines imprint. For an editor, Gernsback recommended Charles Hornig, who had edited Wonder Stories for Gernsback from 1933 to 1936. Silberkleit took the recommendation, and Hornig was hired in October 1938. Hornig had no office; he worked from home, coming into the office as needed to drop off manuscripts and dummy materials, and pick up typeset materials to proof. He was given broad freedom to select what he wanted to publish, since Silberkleit's chief editor, Abner J. Sundell, knew little about sf and did not get involved in running the magazine.

To spread his costs over more magazines, Silberkleit soon decided to launch two additional titles. In November 1939 the first issue of Future Fiction appeared; it was followed in July 1940 by Science Fiction Quarterly. Hornig was editor for all three of the magazines. In October 1940, Hornig, who was a pacifist, received his military call-up. He decided to move to California and register as a conscientious objector; he continued to edit the magazines from the west coast, but Silberkleit was unhappy with the arrangement. Silberkleit allowed Hornig to retain his post as editor of Science Fiction, and offered the editorship of the other two titles to Sam Moskowitz. Moskowitz declined, saying afterwards that he "would never strike at a man's job", (Note: Ashley says that Moskowitz declined "because of his friendship with Hornig", but Davin says that the two men were not friends.) but Donald Wollheim, a member of a group of aspiring writers called the Futurians, heard about the offer. Wollheim told Robert W. Lowndes, another member of the Futurians, about the opening, and urged him to write to Silberkleit. Lowndes later recalled Wollheim's idea: "In the letter, I'd suggest that it might be a good idea to add a science fiction title to the list, offering my services as editor at a slightly lower price than Hornig was being paid, and also find fault with all the other sf titles presently out, but particularly with Hornig's". Lowndes relates that Silberkleit took the bait and hired him in November 1940; Hornig recalls the separation as being by mutual consent because of his move to California. Lowndes subsequently agreed that this was likely to be the real reason Silberkleit replaced Hornig.

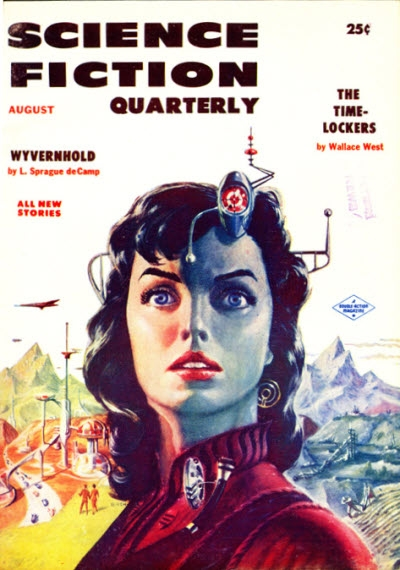
The August 1956 issue of Science Fiction Quarterly; cover art by Ed Emshwiller

The first issues Lowndes was responsible for were the Spring 1941 issue of Science Fiction Quarterly and the April 1941 issue of Future Fiction. Initially Silberkleit kept tighter control on Lowndes' editorial selections than he had over Hornig, vetoing five of the seven stories Lowndes proposed for the April 1941 Future, but by the August 1941 issue, Lowndes later recalled, Silberkleit "was satisfied that I knew what I was doing, and [...] didn't need to oversee any story I had accepted".

In 1950 Silberkleit revived Future Fiction, and the following year he brought back Science Fiction Quarterly, with the first issue of the new series dated May 1951. A new magazine, Dynamic Science Fiction, followed in 1952. All three were edited by Lowndes and all were in pulp format. Sales were satisfactory, but Silberkleit decided to experiment with the digest format, which was starting to become more popular. By the end of 1955 he had cancelled Dynamic Science Fiction, switched Future Fiction to digest format, and relaunched Science Fiction as a digest under a new title, Science Fiction Stories. Only Science Fiction Quarterly was left in pulp format—Silberkleit felt that a quarterly digest would not be as successful as a quarterly pulp. The pulps were dying off, and when Other Worlds switched to digest format in 1956, Science Fiction Quarterly became the only remaining sf magazine still being published as a pulp. In 1957 American News Company, one of the biggest magazine distributors, was liquidated, and the resulting changes in the national magazine distribution network, along with poor sales, finally killed Science Fiction Quarterly. The last issue was dated February 1958.

== Contents and reception ==
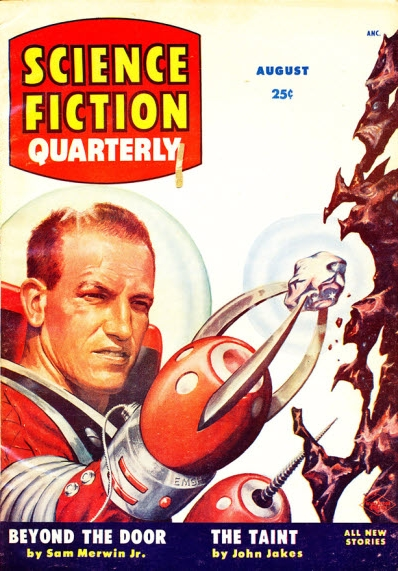
The August 1955 issue; cover art by Ed Emshwiller

Silberkleit's magazines were given very limited budgets. Hornig worked with Julius Schwartz, a literary agent who was a friend of his; this gave him access to stories by the writers Schwartz represented, but Schwartz would not allow his authors' real names to be used unless they were paid at least one cent per word. Hornig could not afford to pay the one cent rate for everything he bought, so he paid half a cent a word for much of what he acquired through Schwartz, and ran those stories under pseudonyms. Unsurprisingly, given the low rates, the stories sent to Hornig had usually already been rejected by the better-paying markets. The result was mediocre fiction, even from the better known writers that Hornig was able to attract. The magazines paid on publication, rather than acceptance, and this slower payment also discouraged some authors from submitting material.

Science Fiction Quarterly was intended by Silberkleit to include a full-length novel in each issue. Silberkleit obtained permission from Hugo Gernsback to reprint two novels from Science Wonder Quarterly: The Moon Conquerors by R.H. Romans, and The Shot Into Infinity by Otto Willi Gail. Although these stories were somewhat dated, they were better quality than the fiction Hornig was able to obtain for his other magazines. When Lowndes took over, the policy of including a novel in every issue continued, and Silberkleit again obtained reprint rights to fill some of these slots, this time with Ray Cummings, five of whose novels would appear in Science Fiction Quarterly over the next two years, starting with Tarrano the Conqueror in the Summer 1941 issue. Lowndes bought many stories from the Futurians to fill the remaining space in the magazine. These were of variable quality, but overall Science Fiction Quarterly improved once Lowndes took control, and the fiction was as good as or better than the stories to be found in many of the contemporary magazines.

When the magazine was revived, the stated policy was still to publish lead novels and fill the remaining space with short stories, but in fact, with few exceptions, the lead fiction was not of novel length. There were no more reprints, as there had been for the first series. Lowndes was unable to pay his writers rates that were competitive with the magazines that were leading the field, but he was an able editor and produced a magazine of reasonable quality every quarter. The Futurians still occasionally appeared in Science Fiction Quarterly, but Lowndes also attracted some of the newer writers, such as Poul Anderson, William Tenn, and Arthur C. Clarke. Clarke's "Second Dawn", which appeared in the August 1951 issue, is among the better stories Lowndes was able to obtain; he also published Isaac Asimov's "The Last Question" in the November 1956 issue, and James Blish's "Common Time", in August 1953. Lowndes was also able to acquire some good quality nonfiction for the magazine, including a series of articles by James Blish on science in sf, and articles on science fiction by Thomas D. Clareson and L. Sprague de Camp. Blish, writing as William Atheling, Jr., commented in 1953 that Lowndes was doing a "surprisingly good job" with all of Silberkleit's science fiction magazines, despite the low rates and the slow payment to authors.

== Bibliographic details ==
	Winter	Spring	Summer	Fall	Winter
1940			1		
1941	2	3	4		5
1942		6	7	8	9
1943		10			
Issues of Science Fiction Quarterly from 1940 to 1943, showing issue numbers, and indicating editors: Hornig (blue, first two issues), and Lowndes (yellow, remaining eight issues). Note that issue 5 was dated "Winter 1941/42".

Charles Hornig was the editor of the first two issues of the first incarnation of Science Fiction Quarterly; Robert W. Lowndes edited all the subsequent issues. The magazine was printed in pulp format throughout both series. The price was 25 cents throughout the first run, for 144 pages; the second series began at 25 cents, but the price increased to 35 cents for the August 1957 issue. The page count for the second series was 128 pages for much of the run, but from the November 1953 issue to the May 1957 issue it was 96 pages. The publisher for the first issue was Double Action Magazines, with offices in Holyoke, Massachusetts; thereafter the publisher was Columbia Publications for both versions of the magazine. Both Double Action and Columbia were owned by Louis Silberkleit.

	Jan	Feb	Mar	Apr	May	Jun	Jul	Aug	Sep	Oct	Nov	Dec
1951					1/1			1/2			1/3	
1952		1/4			1/5			1/6			2/1	
1953		2/2			2/3			2/4			2/5	
1954		2/6			3/1			3/2			3/3	
1955		3/4			3/5			3/6			4/1	
1956		4/2			4/3			4/4			4/5	
1957		4/6			5/1			5/2			5/3	
1958		5/4										
Issues of Science Fiction Quarterly from 1951 to 1958, showing volume and issue numbers. Lowndes was editor throughout this run.

There were three British reprints of the first series, all published by Gerald Swan. The Summer 1940 issue was reprinted twice. It appeared first (with cuts) as Yankee Science Fiction, issue 3, in February 1942, and then again, uncut, as a paperback, titled The Moon Conquerors, in 1943. The Winter 1941/42 issue was also reprinted in 1943, titled Into the Fourth Dimension and Other Stories.

Ten issues of the second series were reprinted in the U.K. by Thorpe & Porter. The issues, which were cut from the U.S. editions, appeared between February 1952 and August 1955, and corresponded to 10 of the first 13 issues, from May 1951 to May 1954. The omitted issues were November 1951, May 1952, and August 1953. The order of publication was not the same as for the US editions: the sequence was May 51/August 51/February 52/November 52/August 52/May 53/February 54/November 53/February 53/May 54. The first issue was 132 pages; the count was reduced to 130 pages for the second issue, then to 100 pages for two issues, and to 98 pages thereafter. The price was 2/- (10p) for the first two issues, and 1/- (5p) for the remaining eight issues. (Note: Note that Ashley says all ten issues were 128 pages and 1/- in price. The figures given here are from the ISFDB listings which are sourced to a reliable index of the magazine.)

There are no anthologies of stories drawn solely from Science Fiction Quarterly. However, in the 1960s Ivan Howard edited several anthologies for Silberkleit's publishing imprint, Belmont Books, with contents drawn solely from Silberkleit's magazines. One of these, Rare Science Fiction (1963), included three stories from Science Fiction Quarterly.

== Sources ==
- Ashley, Mike (1976) [First printing 1975]. The History of the Science Fiction Magazine: Vol. 2: 1936–1945. Chicago: Henry Regnery Company. ISBN 0-8092-8002-7.
- Ashley, Mike (1985a). "Future Fiction". In Tymn, Marshall B.; Ashley, Mike (eds.). Science Fiction, Fantasy, and Weird Fiction Magazines. Westport CT: Greenwood Press. pp. 277–284. ISBN 0-313-21221-X.
- Ashley, Mike (1985b). "Science Fiction Quarterly". In Tymn, Marshall B.; Ashley, Mike (eds.). Science Fiction, Fantasy, and Weird Fiction Magazines. Westport CT: Greenwood Press. pp. 545–550. ISBN 0-313-21221-X.
- Ashley, Mike (2000). The Time Machines:The Story of the Science-Fiction Pulp Magazines from the beginning to 1950. Liverpool: Liverpool University Press. ISBN 0-85323-865-0.
- Ashley, Mike (2005). Transformations:The Story of the Science-Fiction Magazines from 1950 to 1970. Liverpool: Liverpool University Press. ISBN 0-85323-779-4.
- Ashley, Mike; Thompson, Raymond H. (1985). "Science Fiction". In Tymn, Marshall B.; Ashley, Mike (eds.). Science Fiction, Fantasy, and Weird Fiction Magazines. Westport CT: Greenwood Press. pp. 511–519. ISBN 0-313-21221-X.
- Atheling, William Jr. (1967) [First printing 1964]. The Issue at Hand. Chicago: Advent: Publishers.
- Davin, Eric Leif (1999). Pioneers of Wonder: Conversations with the Founders of Science Fiction. Amherst NY: Prometheus Books. ISBN 1-57392-702-3.
- del Rey, Lester (1979). The World of Science Fiction: 1926–1976: The History of a Subculture. New York: Del Rey Books. ISBN 0-345-25452-X.
- Edwards, Malcolm; Nicholls, Peter (1993). "SF magazines". In Clute, John; Nicholls, Peter (eds.). The Encyclopedia of Science Fiction. New York: St. Martin's Press, Inc. pp. 1066–1071. ISBN 0-312-09618-6.
- Knight, Damon (1977). The Futurians. New York: John Day.
- Rhoades, Shirrel (2008). A Complete History of American Comic Books. New York: Peter Lang.
