= Dynamic Science Fiction =

US pulp science fiction magazine

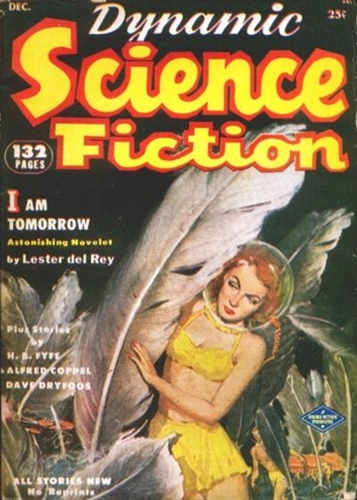
Front cover of the December 1952 issue; art by A. Leslie Ross.

Dynamic Science Fiction was an American pulp magazine which published six issues from December 1952 to January 1954. It was a companion to Future Science Fiction, and like that magazine was edited by Robert W. Lowndes and published by Columbia Publications. Stories that appeared in its pages include "The Duplicated Man" by Lowndes and James Blish, and "The Possessed" by Arthur C. Clarke. It was launched at the end of the pulp era, and when publisher Louis Silberkleit converted Future to a digest format in 1954, he decided not to do the same with Dynamic, simply cancelling the magazine.

== Publishing history and contents ==
Although science fiction had been published in the United States before the 1920s, it did not begin to coalesce into a separately marketed genre until the appearance in 1926 of Amazing Stories, a pulp magazine published by Hugo Gernsback. By the end of the 1930s, the field was booming. Between early 1939 and mid-1940 publisher Louis Silberkleit launched three sf pulp magazines: Science Fiction, Future Fiction, and Science Fiction Quarterly. All three had ceased publication by the end of World War II, killed by a combination of falling sales and wartime paper shortages. In 1950 and 1951, Silberkleit revived Future Fiction, and Science Fiction Quarterly, and the following year, he launched Dynamic Science Fiction, with the first issue dated November 1952. All three of the magazines were edited by Robert W. Lowndes, who had also edited most of the earlier issues for Silberkleit. In mid-1953, Silberkleit cut rates and slowed down payments to contributors as a result of falling circulation. By this time, Silberkleit was experimenting with the digest format for Science Fiction Stories, and he soon cancelled Dynamic Science Fiction, leaving only Science Fiction Quarterly in pulp format.

Silberkleit initially paid reasonably good rates, and Lowndes was able to obtain some good quality material. Some of the stories include Arthur C. Clarke's "The Possessed" (March 1953); Lester del Rey's "I Am Tomorrow" (December 1952), and James Blish and Lowndes' novel The Duplicated Man (August 1953, with Lowndes' name concealed by a pseudonym, "Michael Sherman"). Lowndes also published nonfiction, including two long critical essays by James E. Gunn, "The Philosophy of Science Fiction" (serialized in the March and June 1953 issues), and "The Plot Forms of Science Fiction" (serialized in the October 1953 and January 1954 issues). These four articles formed Gunn's Master of Arts thesis; (Note: According to science fiction historian Mike Ashley, this is the only time a pulp magazine ever published a Master of Arts thesis.) Gunn subsequently became a prominent science fiction critic.

== Bibliographic details ==
	Jan	Feb	Mar	Apr	May	Jun	Jul	Aug	Sep	Oct	Nov	Dec
1952												1/1
1953			1/2			1/3		1/4		1/5		
1954	1/6											
Issues of Dynamic Science Fiction from 1952 to 1954, showing volume and issue numbers. Lowndes was editor throughout.

Robert W. Lowndes was the editor of all six issues of Dynamic Science Fiction, which remained in pulp format throughout its run. It was priced at 25 cents throughout, and was 128 pages for the first four issues, and 96 pages for the last two.

Three issues were reprinted in the U.K. by Thorpe & Porter, of Leicester. These were dated January, June and November 1954, and were pulp format. They were priced at 1/- and were 96 pages. They correspond to the U.S. issues from June 1953, December 1952, and January 1954, respectively.

There are no anthologies of stories drawn solely from Dynamic Science Fiction, but in the 1960s, Ivan Howard edited several anthologies for Silberkleit's publishing imprint, Belmont Books, with contents drawn solely from Silberkleit's magazines. These included:

- Howard, Ivan, ed. (1963). Way Out. New York: Belmont Books. Six of the seven stories are from Dynamic Science Fiction, mostly from the first issue.
- Howard, Ivan, ed. (1963). Novelets of Science Fiction. New York: Belmont Books. Four of the eight stories are from Dynamic Science Fiction.

== Sources ==
- Ashley, Mike (1985). "Dynamic Science Fiction". In Tymn, Marshall B.; Ashley, Mike (eds.). Science Fiction, Fantasy, and Weird Fiction Magazines. Westport CT: Greenwood Press. pp. 196–98. ISBN 0-313-21221-X.
- Ashley, Mike (2005). Transformations:The Story of the Science-Fiction Magazines from 1950 to 1970. Liverpool: Liverpool University Press. ISBN 0-85323-779-4.
- Edwards, Malcolm; Nicholls, Peter (1993). "SF magazines". In Clute, John; Nicholls, Peter (eds.). The Encyclopedia of Science Fiction. New York: St. Martin's Press, Inc. pp. 1066–71. ISBN 0-312-09618-6.
- Rhoades, Shirrel (2008). A Complete History of American Comic Books. New York: Peter Lang.
