= Beyond the Gates =

Beyond the Gates may refer to:

== Music ==
- Beyond the Gates (Possessed album), 1986
- Beyond the Gates (Joacim Cans album), 2004
- Beyond the Gates (music festival), an extreme metal festival held annually in August in Bergen, Norway

== Film and television ==
- The Walls of Malapaga (alternate English title: Beyond the Gates), a 1949 Franco-Italian film
- Shooting Dogs (U.S. title: Beyond the Gates), a 2005 film about the 1994 Rwandan Genocide
- Beyond the Gates (2016 film), a 2016 American horror film
- Beyond the Gates (TV series), an American daytime soap opera
- Beyond the Gates, also Beyond the Gates of Splendor, a 2002 documentary film about Operation Auca

== See also ==
- Beyond the Gates of Dream, a collection of short stories by Lin Carter
