= The Duplicated Man =

1953 novel by James Blish

First book edition (1959) Cover art by Ed Emshwiller

The Duplicated Man is a science fiction novel which was one of the first fictional works about cloning. It was co-written by James Blish and Robert Lowndes. The Duplicated Man was first published in the August 1953 edition of Dynamic Science Fiction and in book form, in 1959 by Avalon Books.

== Plot summary ==
At war with Venus for decades, the Earth's military authority stood its ground. Missiles kept raining down on Earth with unpredictable regularity. Nobody knew where the next missile would hit. But conventional wisdom dictated that every attack be met with a counter-attack.

However, a pacifist peace party sought to have a truce declared with Venus. Paul Danton, a member of a subversive political party, who believed in peace so be his answer to make peace was considered.

It was a peculiar stroke of luck that he found a human duplication machine. It was an old machine, and it didn't work reliably after the first five copies were made. But if he could just duplicate the right world leaders, essentially make extra copies of them, maybe he would have a chance bringing peace to Earth and Venus.

== Reception ==
Floyd C. Gale of Galaxy Science Fiction rated The Duplicated Man three and a half stars out of five: "Deviousness of plotting and many thumbnail character sketches enliven the book".

== See also ==
- Venus in fiction
