= The Liberation of Earth =

1953 short story by William Tenn

- Short story by William Tenn
- Country: United States
- Language: English
- Genre: Science fiction

Publication
- Published in: Future Science Fiction
- Publication type: Periodical
- Publisher: Columbia Publications, Inc.
- Media type: Print (Magazine)
- Publication date: May 1953

"The Liberation of Earth" is a science fiction short story by American author William Tenn, written in 1950, first published in 1953, and reprinted several times in various anthologies, including 1955 collection Of all Possible Worlds and 1967 anthology The Starlit Corridor. The story, which Tenn described as having been inspired by the Korean War, describes Earth becoming a battleground between two powerful alien races who repeatedly "liberate" it from each other.

== Plot summary ==
Several centuries in the future, a parent passes down the story of Earth's history to their children while they struggle to "suck air".

The story begins with aliens arriving in an enormous spaceship and setting up base in southern France. When it is discovered their language bears some resemblance to Bengali, humanity is able to talk to them. The aliens call themselves the "Dendi" and are a member of the benevolent Galactic Federation. They have come to Earth to set up a communications relay as part of the galactic war with the evil "Troxxt". The Dendi are otherwise uncommunicative, except at one point when they tell humans to abandon the area of Washington, DC, where they set up a huge building which is later learned to be a recreation hall.

The Troxxt arrive and a battle breaks out, killing one-tenth of humanity before the Dendi flee into space; Marseille is destroyed by rocket exhaust. The Troxxt land and take what appear to be hostages, but later return having been trained as interpreters. They explain that the Dendi are tyrants and that the Galactic Federation is a lie. The Troxxt are the leaders of the carbon-based-lifeform resistance against the silicon-based Dendi, and invite humanity to join them in their great crusade to free protoplasmic life. After killing any human who collaborated with the Dendi (which includes most high-ranking government officials), they work thousands to death in industrial projects.

The Dendi return and reliberate Earth after a long battle. Australia and Venus are destroyed in the process, the latter which event alters Earth's orbit. The Dendi explain that the real war is between vertebrates and the evil worm-like Troxxt, asking how humanity could be so easily taken in by invertebrate propaganda? The Dendi execute everyone who collaborated with the Troxxt.

Several more re-reliberations ensue, during which more explanations are given, more collaborators are killed, the climate and atmosphere are severely damaged by alien weapons, and so much of the Northern Hemisphere is destroyed that Earth becomes "pear-shaped". Eventually what remains is a cinder of a planet in an elliptical orbit, slowly losing air, abandoned by both Troxxt and Dendi as it is no longer safe enough for their soldiers.

The remaining humans now live in a primitive, desperate state, eating weeds, drinking from puddles and desperately trying to inhale the remaining air. However, they appear proud of their simple lives and their role in the Great War. The parent ends their tale with a traditional adage, that "we can say with pardonable pride that we have been about as thoroughly liberated as it is possible for a race and a planet to be!"

== Critical response ==
Nick Gevers described "The Liberation of Earth" as "great", and Locus columnist Rich Horton called it "one of 1953's best shorts". In 1986, it was included in the anthology Isaac Asimov Presents The Great SF Stories 15 as one of the best science fiction short stories of 1953. It was also reprinted in the 2016 anthology The Big Book of Science Fiction. Editors Ann and Jeff VanderMeer state that it is "considered one of the classic science fiction stories of all time."

== Sources ==
- Tenn, William. Immodest Proposals: The Complete Science Fiction of William Tenn, Volume 1. New England Science Fiction Association, 2001. ISBN 1-886778-19-1.
