= Future Science Fiction and Science Fiction Stories =

Two related US pulp science fiction magazines

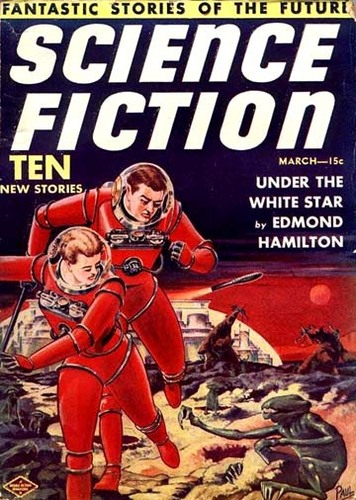
Cover of the first issue of Science Fiction, dated March 1939. The artwork is by Frank R. Paul

Future Science Fiction and Science Fiction Stories were two American science fiction magazines that were published under various names between 1939 and 1943 and again from 1950 to 1960. Both publications were edited by Charles Hornig for the first few issues; Robert W. Lowndes took over in late 1941 and remained editor until the end. The initial launch of the magazines came as part of a boom in science fiction pulp magazine publishing at the end of the 1930s. In 1941 the two magazines were combined into one, titled Future Fiction combined with Science Fiction, but in 1943 wartime paper shortages ended the magazine's run, as Louis Silberkleit, the publisher, decided to focus his resources on his mystery and western magazine titles. In 1950, with the market improving again, Silberkleit relaunched Future Fiction, still in the pulp format. In the mid-1950s he also relaunched Science Fiction, this time under the title Science Fiction Stories. Silberkleit kept both magazines on very slim budgets throughout the 1950s. In 1960 both titles ceased publication when their distributor suddenly dropped all of Silberkleit's titles.

The fiction was generally unremarkable, with few memorable stories being published, particularly in the earlier versions of the magazines. Lowndes spent much effort to set a friendly and engaging tone in both magazines, with letter columns and reader departments that interested fans. He was more successful than Hornig in obtaining good stories, partly because he had good relationships with several well-known and emerging writers. Among the better-known stories he published were "The Liberation of Earth" by William Tenn, and "If I Forget Thee, Oh Earth" by Arthur C. Clarke.

== Publishing history ==
Science Fiction
	Jan	Feb	Mar	Apr	May	Jun	Jul	Aug	Sep	Oct	Nov	Dec
1939			1/1			1/2		1/3		1/4		1/5
1940			1/6			2/1				2/2		
1941	2/3		2/4			2/5			2/6			
Issues of Science Fiction from 1939 to 1941, showing volume/issue number. Charles Hornig was editor throughout.

Although science fiction (sf) had been published before the 1920s, it did not begin to coalesce into a separately marketed genre until the appearance in 1926 of Amazing Stories, a pulp magazine published by Hugo Gernsback. By the end of the 1930s the field was booming. One of Gernsback's employees, Louis Silberkleit, became a publisher in his own right in 1934 when he founded the Winford Publishing Company. Towards the end of the 1930s Silberkleit decided to launch an sf pulp magazine under his Blue Ribbon Magazines imprint; the title he chose was Science Fiction. Gernsback recommended Charles Hornig to Silberkleit for the post of editor; Hornig had previously edited Wonder Stories for Gernsback from 1933 to 1936. Silberkleit took the recommendation and Hornig was hired in October 1938. Hornig had no office; he worked from home, coming into the office as needed to drop off manuscripts and dummy materials, and pick up typeset materials to proof. He was given broad freedom to select what he wanted to publish; he reported to Silberkleit's chief editor, Abner J. Sundell, but Sundell knew little about sf and did not get involved with running the magazine. The first issue was dated March 1939. The schedule was intended to be bimonthly, but it began to slip immediately, with the second issue dated June 1939.

Future Fiction and Future Fiction combined with Science Fiction
	Jan	Feb	Mar	Apr	May	Jun	Jul	Aug	Sep	Oct	Nov	Dec
1939											1/1	
1940			1/2				1/3				1/4	
1941				1/5				1/6		2/1		2/2
1942		2/3		2/4		2/5		2/6		3/1		3/2
1943		3/3		3/4			3/5					
Issues of Future Fiction from 1939 to 1943, showing volume/issue number, and indicating editors: Hornig (blue, 1939 – November 1940), and Lowndes (yellow, April 1941 – July 1943). Note that the last two issues were actually titled Science Fiction Stories.

To spread his costs over more magazines, Silberkleit soon decided to launch two additional titles. When he had worked for Gernsback, Silberkleit had suggested "Future Fiction" as a possible title for the magazine Gernsback was planning to launch. Gernsback eventually chose "Amazing Stories" instead, and Silberkleit now decided to use his original suggestion for one of the new magazines. In November 1939 the first issue of Future Fiction appeared; it was followed in July 1940 by Science Fiction Quarterly. Hornig was editor for all three magazines. In October 1940, Hornig received his military draft notice; he was a pacifist, and decided to move to California and register as a conscientious objector. He continued to edit the magazines from the west coast, but Silberkleit was unhappy with the arrangement. Silberkleit allowed Hornig to retain his post as editor of Science Fiction, and offered the editorship of the other two titles to Sam Moskowitz. Moskowitz declined, saying afterwards "I would never strike at a man's job", (Note: Ashley says that Moskowitz declined "because of his friendship with Hornig", but Davin says that the two men were not friends.) but Donald Wollheim heard of the offer and prompted Robert W. Lowndes to write to Silberkleit. Lowndes later recalled Wollheim's idea: "In the letter, I'd suggest that it might be a good idea to add a science fiction title to the list, offering my services as editor at a slightly lower price than Hornig was being paid, and also find fault with all the other sf titles presently out, but particularly with Hornig's". Lowndes relates that Silberkleit took the bait and hired him in November 1940; Hornig recalls the separation as being by mutual consent because of his move to California. Lowndes subsequently agreed that this was likely to be the real reason Silberkleit replaced Hornig. The first issues Lowndes was responsible for were the Spring 1941 issue of Science Fiction Quarterly and the April 1941 issue of Future Fiction. He completed the preparations for the last issue of Science Fiction, dated September 1941, but he used material that Hornig had already selected for the magazine, with minor exceptions. The changes included the replacement of Fantasy Times, a fan department by James Taurasi, with Futurian Times, a similar department from a rival group of fans, the Futurians, to which Lowndes belonged. (Note: Lowndes later regretted his partisanship, commenting that he should "have just made a few corrections in Taurasi's somewhat sloppy writing and run the sheet he prepared".) Initially Silberkleit kept tighter control on Lowndes' editorial selections than he had on Hornig's, vetoing five of the seven stories Lowndes proposed for the April 1941 Future, but by the August 1941 issue, Lowndes later recalled, Silberkleit "was satisfied that I knew what I was doing, and ... didn't need to oversee any story I had accepted".

Science Fiction was not selling well, and later that year Silberkleit merged it with Future Fiction, under the title Future Combined with Science Fiction. The last independent issue of Science Fiction was dated September 1941, and the first merged issue was dated October 1941. The final two issues of the combined magazine, dated April and June 1943, were, confusingly, titled Science Fiction Stories; this was an attempt to improve sales by reminding readers of Science Fiction, but before sales figures could be tallied to determine the impact of the title change, Silberkleit made the decision to cease publication. The June 1943 issue was the last for some years: Silberkleit was forced to cut some of his titles because of wartime paper shortages, and he decided to retain his western and detective magazines instead.

=== Revival in the 1950s ===
Future Fiction
		Spring			Summer			Fall			Winter	
	Jan	Feb	Mar	Apr	May	Jun	Jul	Aug	Sep	Oct	Nov	Dec
1950					1/1		1/2		1/3		1/4	
1951	1/5		1/6		2/1		2/2		2/3		2/4	
1952	2/5		2/6		3/1		3/2		3/3		3/4	
1953	3/5		3/6		4/1		4/2		4/3		4/4	
1954	4/5		4/6			5/1		5/2		5/3		
1955											28	
1956		29			30						31	
1957		32			33			34				
1958		35		36		37		38		39		40
1959		41		42		43		44		45		46
1960		47		48								
Issues of Future Science Fiction from 1950 to 1960, showing volume/issue numbers. Lowndes was editor throughout. Underlining indicates that an issue was titled as a quarterly (e.g. "Fall 1957") rather than as a monthly. Note that issues 28, 29, and 30 were not dated on the masthead; the dates given are approximate.

In 1950, Silberkleit brought back Future, under the title Future Combined with Science Fiction Stories; this allowed Silberkleit to keep the rights to both the titles. The first issue was dated May/June 1950. In January 1952 the title changed to just Future Science Fiction Stories. Payment rates at that time were one to three cents per word. In the summer of 1953, with Future still in pulp format, Silberkleit issued a single digest-sized magazine with no number and no date, under the title Science Fiction Stories. Another issue with the same format and title followed in the spring of 1954, also unnumbered. Silberkleit decided that the digest format was partly responsible for the good sales of these experimental issues, so he changed the format of Future from pulp to digest. The first issue in the new format was dated January 1955, and in response to reader feedback the title was changed to Science Fiction Stories. The volume numbering was continued from the existing Future volume numbering, despite the fact that the title was taken from Science Fiction, the earlier magazine. Complicating matters, Silberkleit decided later in 1955 that the market could support both titles, so he revived Future again. Since Science Fiction Stories was using the volume numbering from the previous pulp-format incarnation of Future, Silberkleit switched to an issue number format, with no volume. The first issue was numbered 28, counting forward from the May/June 1950 issue as 1.

Science Fiction Stories
	Jan	Feb	Mar	Apr	May	Jun	Jul	Aug	Sep	Oct	Nov	Dec
1955	5/4		5/5		5/6		6/1		6/2		6/3	
1956	6/4		6/5		6/6		7/1		7/2		7/3	
1957	7/4		7/5		7/6		8/1		8/2		8/3	
1958	8/4		8/5		8/6	8/7	9/1	9/2	9/3		9/4	
1959	9/5	9/6	10/1		10/2		10/3		10/4		10/5	
1960	10/6		11/1		11/2							
Issues of Science Fiction Stories, not including the two experimental issues from 1953 and 1954. Lowndes was editor throughout.

Both Science Fiction Stories and Future Fiction were able to maintain a fairly regular schedule through the rest of the 1950s. Science Fiction Stories was bimonthly throughout, except for a brief period from mid-1958 to early 1959 when it patchily adhered to a monthly schedule. Future Fiction began with three undated issues, then switched to a quarterly schedule in 1956, and finally to a regular bimonthly schedule from the start of 1958.

With the September 1955 issue, the title graphic of Science Fiction Stories was modified so that the cover read The Original Science Fiction Stories. This was intended to make it clear that the magazine was a continuation of the 1939 version of Science Fiction, but it led to additional confusion, with some readers believing that this was an entirely new magazine. Lowndes addressed the confusion in the letter column of Science Fiction Stories, saying

I am often asked whether Future SF October 1954 Volume 5 Number 3 should be followed by Volume 5 Number 4 (Science Fiction Stories January 1955) or by Future SF No. 28. To this I reply that you may have it either way, or in this instance, both ways! Really, I don't see why science fictionists, who can absorb alternate time tracks etc. with the utmost aplomb, should be confused.

In 1960 Silberkleit's distributor stopped carrying his magazines, and both titles ceased publication, with no notice given in their final issues that this was the end. The last issues were the April 1960 Future Science Fiction and the May 1960 Science Fiction Stories. James Taurasi acquired rights to the Science Fiction Stories title from Silberkleit and produced three semi-professional issues in 1961, 1962, and 1963, but the venture was not successful enough for Taurasi to continue.

== Contents and reception ==
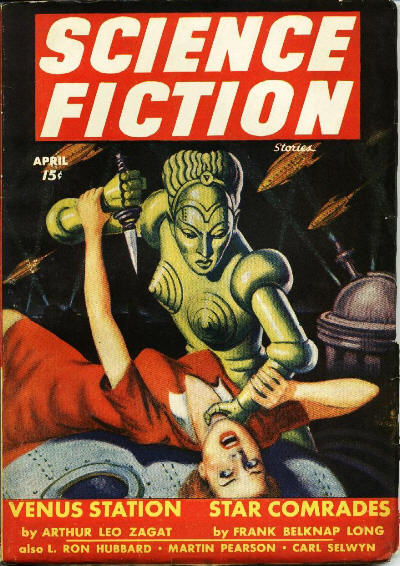
Cover of the April 1943 issue of Future Fiction, usually indexed under that title although this issue is titled Science Fiction Stories. The artwork is by Milton Luros.

The first issue of Science Fiction showed the continuing influence of Hugo Gernsback in the American science fiction magazine field: in addition to an editor who had worked for him, the magazine featured a guest editorial by Gernsback, and the cover was painted by Frank R. Paul, a stalwart of the Gernsback days—in fact, all 12 of Science Fiction's covers for the first series were painted by Paul. Both Future Fiction and Science Fiction began life with very limited budgets. Hornig worked with Julius Schwartz, a literary agent who was a friend of his; this gave him access to stories by the writers Schwartz represented, but Schwartz would not allow his authors' real names to be used unless they were paid at least one cent per word. Hornig could not afford to pay the one cent rate for everything he bought, so he paid half a cent a word for much of what he acquired through Schwartz, and ran those stories under pseudonyms. Unsurprisingly, given the low rates, the stories sent to Hornig had usually already been rejected by the better-paying markets. The result was mediocre fiction, even from the better-known writers that Hornig was able to attract. The magazines paid on publication, rather than acceptance, and this slower payment also discouraged some authors from submitting material.

A letter from Ray Bradbury, who was a friend of Hornig's, was published in the second issue of Science Fiction, encouraging Hornig to publish sophisticated stories; in response, Hornig wrote "I'm trying to give the magazine an appeal to mature minds", but sf historian Mike Ashley comments that "this never became evident". Hornig's comment was probably intended as a criticism of Raymond Palmer's editorial approach at Amazing Stories and Fantastic Adventures, but Ashley points out that the authors Hornig relied on, concealed behind pseudonyms, were generally the same authors that were selling to Palmer. The first issue of Future included stories by M.M. Kaplan, J. Harvey Haggard, and Miles J. Breuer, all of whom had been more active some years earlier, and Ashley suggests that Hornig may have obtained some of the many stories that Palmer threw out when he became editor of Amazing Stories in 1938.

When Future was relaunched in early 1950, the sf magazine field was not particularly crowded, and Lowndes was able to attract moderately good stories from writers who were either well-known or on their way up in the field. The first issue included stories by James Blish, Lester del Rey and Murray Leinster; other authors featured in the early issues included Fritz Leiber, Judith Merril, H. Beam Piper, and L. Sprague de Camp. Some of the better-known stories Lowndes published in the early 1950s were "And There Was Light" by del Rey, "If I Forget Thee, Oh Earth" by Arthur C. Clarke, and "The Liberation of Earth" by William Tenn, which Damon Knight described as "the funniest story [Tenn has] ever written". He also bought work by some of the women writers active in the 1950s, including several early stories by Carol Emshwiller. Lowndes knew many successful writers in the field, and was able to call on them for stories, but the expanding sf magazine market of the mid-1950s meant that the best material was spread thinly. To attract readers, Lowndes established a friendly and personal style for the magazine, with letter columns and departments aimed at science fiction fans. Blish, writing as William Atheling, Jr., commented in 1953 that Lowndes was doing a "surprisingly good job" with Future, despite the low rates and the slow payment to authors.

The trial issues of Science Fiction Stories in 1953 and 1954 were competent but unremarkable, with stories by some popular writers, such as Poul Anderson, Algis Budrys, and Philip K. Dick. Once Science Fiction Stories became established in 1955, Future was relegated to the junior role, and Science Fiction Stories tended to publish the better stories of the two. During the period when Science Fiction Stories was monthly, it carried serialized novels, including de Camp's The Tower of Zanid and Ward Moore and Robert Bradford's Caduceus Wild. It also published "Genius Loci", described by Ashley as one of Thomas N. Scortia's best short stories. Some well-received stories did appear in Future towards the end of the decade, including "Vulcan's Hammer", an early novella version of Philip K. Dick's novel of the same name; Clifford D. Simak's "Worlds Without End"; and Judith Merril's "Homecalling", reprinted in the 1960s in SF Impulse, whose editor, Kyril Bonfiglioli, commented "I don't believe I have ever read a more successful attempt to imagine an utterly alien way of thought." Lowndes did what he could to provide interesting non-fiction departments: a book review column was started in the early 1950s, and the end of the decade saw a series of science articles written by Isaac Asimov, and critical articles on science fiction history, written by Lowndes himself. R.A. Lafferty's first story appeared in Science Fiction Stories in the January 1960 issue, shortly before the magazine was closed down. The budget for both magazines, never very great, shrank even further towards the end, so that Lowndes had to fill space with reprints and re-use old illustrations to avoid paying for new stories and artwork.

== Bibliographic details ==
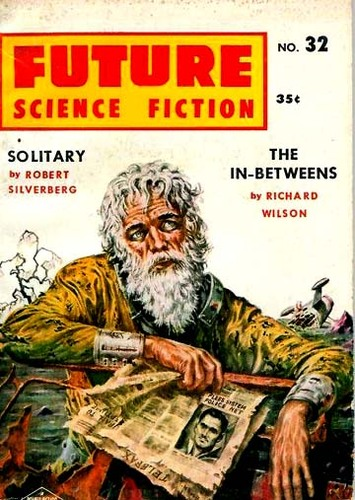
Cover of the March 1957 issue of Future Science Fiction. The artwork is by Emsh.

Charles Hornig was the editor of all 12 issues of the first incarnation of Science Fiction, and of the first five issues of Future Fiction. Robert W. Lowndes was the editor of all subsequent issues of both titles. Both Future and Science Fiction began as pulp magazines; the 1953 experimental issue of Science Fiction Stories saw a change to digest format for that title, and Future followed suit in late 1955 with issue 28. Both titles were initially priced at 15 cents. Future raised its price to 20 cents for the July 1943 issue, the last of its first run, but dropped to 15 cents again when it was relaunched in 1950. With the November 1950 issue the price went back to 20 cents, and it rose to 25 cents with the January 1953 issue and 35 cents in June 1954. When Science Fiction Stories reappeared in 1953, it was priced at 35 cents, and stayed at that price throughout the remainder of its run.

Science Fiction began in March 1939 at 132 pages. Future Fiction was 112 pages when it was launched in November of that year, and shortly afterwards, March 1940, Science Fiction dropped to 116 pages. The combined magazine, Future Combined with Science Fiction, retained Future's page count of 112; when Future was relaunched, still as a pulp, in 1950, the page count had dropped again, to 96. Both Future and Science Fiction Stories were 128 pages long when they changed to digest format; Future remained at that length, but Science Fiction Stories switched to 144 pages for nine issues, from January 1956 to May 1957.

The sequence of title changes for the two magazines is summarized below. For Science Fiction: (Note: See the individual issues. For convenience, an online index is available at "Future/Future Combined with Science Fiction – Issue Grid". Al von Ruff.)

Start month	End month	Title	Number of issues
Mar-39	Sep-41	Science Fiction	12
1953	May-60	Science Fiction Stories	38

Note that although the cover read "The Original Science Fiction Stories" for much of the second run, the title was always "Science Fiction Stories", though some reference books index the magazine under "O". For Future:

Start month	End month	Title	Number of issues
Nov-39	Aug-41	Future Fiction	6
Oct-41	Aug-42	Future Combined with Science Fiction	6
Oct-42	Feb-43	Future Fantasy and Science Fiction	3
Apr-43	Jul-43	Science Fiction Stories	2
May-50	Nov-51	Future Combined with Science Fiction Stories	10
Jan-52	May-52	Future Science Fiction Stories	3
Jul-52	Apr-60	Future Science Fiction	35

Louis Silberkleit was the publisher of both magazines throughout their existence, but he changed the imprint he used for them twice. Both were initially published by Blue Ribbon Magazines, Holyoke, Massachusetts. Starting with the March 1940 issue of Future, and the March 1940 issue of Science Fiction, the magazines were published by Double Action Magazines, with offices in Chicago. This changed to Columbia Publications, with offices in Springfield and Holyoke, Massachusetts, with the March 1941 issue of Science Fiction and the April 1941 issue of Future.

=== Canadian edition ===
A Canadian edition of Science Fiction ran for 6 pulp-sized issues of 64 pages from October 1941 to June 1942, priced at 25 cents; it was intended to be monthly but there were no issues in December 1941, or in April or May 1942. The publisher was Superior Magazines of Toronto for the first two issues, and Duchess Printing of Toronto for the remaining four. A different editor, William Brown-Forbes, was listed, but the fiction was all reprinted from Silberkleit's U.S. magazines. The artwork was new, however, with covers by John Hilkert and Edwin Shaw, among others.

=== British editions ===
Two issues of Science Fiction were reprinted in the UK by Atlas Publications; these were abridged versions of the October and December 1939 issues. They were 96 pages, in pulp format.

There were no British reprints of the first series of Future, but Thorpe & Porter reprinted 14 numbered and undated issues from November 1951 to June 1954, corresponding roughly to the U.S. issues from March 1951 to March 1954. They were 96 pages in pulp format, and were priced at 1/6 (7.5p). Thorpe & Porter also published a British reprint series of the second series of Science Fiction Quarterly, comprising ten issues from February 1952 to August 1955. These corresponded to ten of the first thirteen U.S. issues, published between May 1951 and May 1954; the British editions omitted the November 1951, May 1952, and August 1953 issues, and appeared in a different order from the American originals. The British editions were abridged versions of the U.S. issues.

In 1957, Strato Publications (a Thorpe & Porter imprint) reprinted another 11 issues of Future, again undated, from November 1957 to February 1960, corresponding to the U.S. issues from Summer 1957 to August 1959, skipping the February 1958 issue. These were in digest format, and were 128 pages; they were priced at 2/- (10p). Strato Publications also produced a reprint series of Science Fiction; this ran from October 1957 to May 1960, for 12 undated issues, in digest format, 128 pages, priced at 2/-. The first 11 of these reprints were cut versions of the U.S. originals, corresponding to 11 of the U.S. issues between September 1957 and May 1959 — the omitted issues were January, March, and September 1958. The final issue was the U.S. issue for May 1960, overprinted with the British price.

=== Later collections ===
There are no anthologies of stories drawn solely from either Science Fiction or Future, but in the 1960s Ivan Howard edited several anthologies for Silberkleit's publishing imprint, Belmont Books, with contents drawn solely from Silberkleit's magazines. These included:

- Howard, Ivan, ed. (1962). The Weird Ones. New York: Belmont Books. Three stories from Future Fiction.
- Howard, Ivan, ed. (1962). Escape to Earth. New York: Belmont Books. Three stories from Future Fiction.
- Howard, Ivan, ed. (1963). Rare Science Fiction. New York: Belmont Books. Four stories from Science Fiction.
- Howard, Ivan, ed. (1963). Novelets of Science Fiction. New York: Belmont Books. Four stories from Future Fiction
- Howard, Ivan, ed. (1963). 6 and the Silent Scream. New York: Belmont Books. Three stories from Science Fiction
- Howard, Ivan, ed. (1964). Masters of Science Fiction. New York: Belmont Books. Four stories from Science Fiction.
- Howard, Ivan, ed. (1964). Things. New York: Belmont Books. Three stories from Future Fiction.
- Howard, Ivan, ed. (1965). Now and Beyond. New York: Belmont Books. Four stories from Science Fiction, and four from Future Fiction.

In addition, Douglas Lindsay edited an anthology titled Blue Moon in 1970, published by Mayflower Books, which contains six stories from the August 1942 issue of Future, plus one story from the Winter 1942 issue of Science Fiction Quarterly.

== Sources ==
- Ashley, Mike (1976) [First edition 1975]. The History of the Science Fiction Magazine: Vol. 2: 1936–1945. Chicago: Henry Regnery Company. ISBN 0-8092-8002-7.
- Ashley, Mike (1985a). "Future Fiction". In Tymn, Marshall B.; Ashley, Mike (eds.). Science Fiction, Fantasy, and Weird Fiction Magazines. Westport CT: Greenwood Press. pp. 277–284. ISBN 0-313-21221-X.
- Ashley, Mike (1985b). "Science Fiction (Canadian)". In Tymn, Marshall B.; Ashley, Mike (eds.). Science Fiction, Fantasy, and Weird Fiction Magazines. Westport CT: Greenwood Press. pp. 519–520. ISBN 0-313-21221-X.
- Ashley, Mike (2000). The Time Machines: The Story of the Science-Fiction Pulp Magazines from the beginning to 1950. Liverpool: Liverpool University Press. ISBN 0-85323-865-0.
- Ashley, Mike (2005). Transformations: The Story of the Science-Fiction Magazines from 1950 to 1970. Liverpool: Liverpool University Press. ISBN 0-85323-779-4.
- Ashley, Mike; Thompson, Raymond H. (1985). "Science Fiction". In Tymn, Marshall B.; Ashley, Mike (eds.). Science Fiction, Fantasy, and Weird Fiction Magazines. Westport CT: Greenwood Press. pp. 511–519. ISBN 0-313-21221-X.
- Atheling, Jr., William (1967) [First edition 1964]. The Issue at Hand. Chicago: Advent: Publishers.
- Boston, John; Broderick, Damien (2012). "Strange Highways". Borgo Literary Guides. Wildside Press. ISSN 0891-9623.
- Davin, Eric Leif (1999). Pioneers of Wonder: Conversations with the Founders of Science Fiction. Amherst NY: Prometheus Books. ISBN 1-57392-702-3.
- de Camp, L. Sprague (1953). Science-Fiction Handbook: The Writing of Imaginative Fiction. New York: Hermitage House.
- del Rey, Lester (1979). The World of Science Fiction: 1926–1976: The History of a Subculture. New York: Del Rey Books. ISBN 0-345-25452-X.
- Edwards, Malcolm; Nicholls, Peter (1993). "SF magazines". In Clute, John; Nicholls, Peter (eds.). The Encyclopedia of Science Fiction. New York: St. Martin's Press, Inc. ISBN 0-312-09618-6.
- Edwards, Malcolm; Parnell, Frank; Nicholls, Peter (1993). "The Original Science Fiction Stories". In Clute, John; Nicholls, Peter (eds.). The Encyclopedia of Science Fiction. New York: St. Martin's Press, Inc. ISBN 0-312-09618-6.
- Knight, Damon (1974) [First edition 1956]. In Search of Wonder: Essays on Modern Science Fiction (2nd (1967) ed.). Chicago: Advent: Publishers. ISBN 0-911682-15-5.
- Knight, Damon (1977). The Futurians. New York: John Day.
- Kyle, David (1977) [First edition 1976]. A Pictorial History of Science Fiction. London: Hamlyn Publishing Group. ISBN 0-600-38193-5.
- Moskowitz, Sam (March 1990). "Canada's Pioneer Science-Fantasy Magazine (La première revue canadienne de science fantaisie)". Science Fiction Studies. 17 (1): 84–92. doi:10.1525/sfs.17.1.084. JSTOR 4239976.
- Rhoades, Shirrel (2008). A Complete History of American Comic Books. New York: Peter Lang.
