= Twisted (anthology) =

- Cover of the first edition.
- Editor: Groff Conklin
- Language: English
- Genre: Horror
- Publisher: Belmont Books
- Publication date: 1962
- Publication place: United States
- Media type: Print (paperback)
- Pages: viii, 189

Twisted is an anthology of horror short stories edited by Groff Conklin. It was first published in paperback by Belmont Books in May 1962 and reprinted in 1967. British paperback editions were issued by Horwitz in 1963 and Four Square Books in 1965. It has also been translated into Spanish.

The book collects fifteen novelettes and short stories by various authors, together with an introduction by the editor. The stories were previously published from 1843 to 1961 in various magazines.

== Contents ==
- "Introduction" (Groff Conklin)
- "The Playground" (Ray Bradbury)
- "The Other Hand" (George Langelaan)
- "The Thing in the Cellar" (David H. Keller, M.D.)
- "The Diary of a Madman" (Guy de Maupassant)
- "The Upturned Face" (Stephen Crane)
- "The Little Man Who Wasn't Quite" (William W. Stuart)
- "Night Drive" (Will F. Jenkins)
- "The Song of Marya" (Walter M. Miller, Jr.)
- "Mrs. Manifold" (Stephen Grendon)
- "A Holy Terror" (Ambrose Bierce)
- "Impulse" (Eric Frank Russell)
- "Brenda" (Margaret St. Clair)
- "The Tell-Tale Heart" (Edgar Allan Poe)
- "The Shunned House" (H. P. Lovecraft)
- "The World Well Lost" (Theodore Sturgeon)
