= The Gate of Time =

1966 novel by Philip José Farmer

- First edition of The Gate of Time
- Author: Philip José Farmer
- Language: English
- Genre: Science fiction
- Publisher: Belmont Books
- Publication date: 1966
- Publication place: United States
- Media type: Print (paperback)
- Pages: 176

The Gate of Time is a 1966 alternate history novel by American writer Philip José Farmer. It was revised and expanded as Two Hawks from Earth in 1979.

An example of anthropological science fiction, the story involves an Iroquois combat pilot (Roger Two Hawks) in World War II who discovers he has been transported to an alternate world in which the North and South American continents never existed and thus his ancestors have all remained in the Old World.

== Publication history ==
The Gate of Time was first published in paperback editions by Belmont Books in the United States in October 1966 and by Quartet in the United Kingdom in September 1974. Later it was revised and expanded as Two Hawks from Earth, in which form it was first published, also in paperback by Ace Books, in May 1979. This edition was reprinted by Berkley Books in July 1985. A trade paperback edition was published by MonkeyBrain Books with a new afterword by Christopher Paul Carey in May 2009.

An authorized sequel, Man of War: A Two Hawks Adventure, was written by Heidi Ruby Miller and published in 2017.

== Plot summary ==
Roger Two Hawks, an Iroquois serving as a combat pilot in World War II, takes part in Operation Tidal Wave on August 1, 1943 and is shot down during the raid on Ploieşti, Romania. While parachuting he feels a strange dizziness. Being hidden by locals, he realizes that they neither look nor speak like Romanians, but rather resemble Native Americans and speak a language distantly resembling that of his own tribe.

The mystery is resolved when he sees a globe and finds that he is in a world where the continents of North and South America do not exist, having mostly been drowned for the whole of humanity's tenure on Earth. As a result, the ancestors of the various Native American tribes did not cross the non-existent Bering Strait but wandered westward into Europe, taking the general place of the Slavs in our history. "Hatti" (Greece) was colonized by the Hittites of our timeline, while Akhaivia (Italy) was colonized by the Greeks instead of the Italic tribes. The Iroquois live in Romania and Ukraine, which is known as Hotinohsonih in this timeline, while the Algonquin occupy Kinukkinuk, roughly co-terminus with our Czech Republic and the Aztecs dominate an equivalent of Russia. "Blodland" is analogous to England, while "Norland" is roughly parallel to Scotland. "Rasna" is cognate with France and Belgium (apart from Normandy, which is "Grettirsland"). "New Crete" is comparable to the Iberian Peninsula, "Doria" matches the Balkan region on our world, and "Saariset" (Japan) is dominated by Finnish speakers. "Dravidia" is India's equivalent in this universe and is a major military power.

While a charismatic Irish religious figure, Hemilka, arose in the fourteenth century in this world, which therefore has a surprising analogue to Christianity as a result, Hemilkism is not an imperialist faith and does not similarly dominate its world.

Though very different from our world, in this reality, too, a war is going on resembling the one which Two Hawks left behind, with Perkunisha, an alternate aggressive Germany-analogue trying to conquer Europe, the Middle East and North Africa (though its dominant people are not Germanic but rather Lithuanians). It has already occupied geographical areas analogous to our timeline's Germany, the Netherlands, Denmark and Poland as a consequence, although not Tyrsland (Sweden). Without North America, the Gulf Stream flows differently and Europe is perceptibly colder in winter. In addition, horses, tobacco, turkeys, camels, rubber and chocolate originated in the Americas, and thus none exist in this timeline.

Two Hawks very quickly gets involved. His knowledge and abilities are very much in demand, since this world does not yet have heavier-than-air flight, and its possession could decide the war. However, without military assistance from any United States equivalent, the war is going badly for the anti-Perkunishan allies. He goes through a very fast-paced series of adventures, involving such elements as Hittites who survived into the 20th century, a Luftwaffe pilot who also ended up in this world, an England which had never known a Roman Empire nor a Norman Conquest but has many Cretan and Semitic elements in its makeup, an unknown chapter in the life of Elizabethan adventurer Humphrey Gilbert, an Arab-colonized South Africa (known as Ikhwan) and Hivika, a mysterious island on the site of our world's Colorado, where an underground Polynesian temple is to be found, suggesting that Polynesians colonized the North American archipelago in the thirteenth century. Two Hawks also experiences a most tempestuous love affair. At the book's end, it is disclosed that Two Hawks is actually not from our alternate world, but from one where Kaiser Wilhelm IV (rather than Adolf Hitler) controls an expansionist, imperialist Germany in its Second World War.
