= Columbia Publications =

Former American publisher

Columbia Publications Ltd.
- Status: Active
- Country of origin: U.S.
- Headquarters location: Washington DC
- Fiction genres: Science fiction, Western, detective stories, crime fiction, mystery fiction, romance fiction, sports fiction
- Imprints: Winford Publications (1934–1940); Northwest Publishing (1935–1940); Chesterfield Publications (1936–1939); Blue Ribbon Magazines (1937–1941); Double Action Magazines (1938–1941)

Columbia Publications is an American publisher of books and magazines featuring the genres of science fiction, westerns, detective stories, romance, and sports fiction. The company published such writers as Isaac Asimov, Louis L'Amour, Arthur C. Clarke, Randall Garrett, Edward D. Hoch, and William Tenn; Robert A. W. Lowndes was an important early editor for such writers as Carol Emshwiller, Edward D. Hoch and Kate Wilhelm.

Operating from the mid-1930s to 1960, Columbia's most notable magazines were the science fiction pulps Future Science Fiction, Science Fiction, and Science Fiction Quarterly. Other long-running titles included Double Action Western Magazine, Real Western, Western Action, Famous Western, Today's Love Stories, Super Sports, and Double Action Detective and Mystery Stories. In addition to pulp magazines, the company also published some paperback novels, primarily in the science fiction genre.

Columbia Publications was the most prolific of a number of pulp imprints operated in the 1930s by Louis Silberkleit. Nominally, their offices were in Springfield, Massachusetts and Holyoke, Massachusetts (the addresses of their printers, binders, and mailers for subscriptions), but they were actually produced out of 60 Hudson Street in New York City.

== History ==
Louis Silberkleit and Maurice Coyne (Note: A 2003 account by journalist and later Archie Comics publicist Rik Offenberger, writing about the formation of Archie, maintains that, "In the early 1930s Louis Silberkleit, Martin Goodman, and Maurice Coyne started Columbia Publications" – a company unrelated to the later Columbia Comics, which began in 1940. "Goodman soon left that company and it was owned solely by Louis Silberkleit and Maurice Coyne. Columbia was one of the last pulp companies, putting out its last pulp in the late 50s..." Bell and Vassallo's 2013 book disputes that Goodman was involved in Columbia Publications, saying, "[T]here is no evidence that Columbia Publications existed before Goodman and SIlberkleit parted company in 1934." The authors add: "Sources contributing to the myth: the late Jerry Bails's Who's Who of American Comics, the late Les Daniels in Marvel: Five Fabulous Decades of the World's Greatest Comics, and David Saunders in Illustration Magazine #14, Summer 2005.") (two out of three of the men who later founded MLJ Magazines (Archie Comic Publications)) started publishing pulps in Sept. 1934 with the publisher brand Winford Publications and the title Double Action Western Magazine, soon joined by Real Western. The two men launched the Northwest Publishing imprint in 1935, Chesterfield Publications in 1936, Blue Ribbon Magazines in 1937, and Double Action Magazines in 1938. Silberkleit ran the companies while Coyne acted as a silent partner and business manager.

Meanwhile, Silberkleit and Coyne had started Columbia Publications in late 1937. Columbia's first titles were Western pulps: Western Yarns debuted in January 1938 and Complete Cowboy in January 1939. Beginning with the June 1940 issue, Columbia took over publication of Western Action from Winford Publications. The same happened in November 1940 with Double Action Western Magazine and Real Western.

Editor Charles Hornig was hired in October 1938. He had no office; he worked from home, coming into the office as needed to drop off manuscripts and dummy materials, and pick up typeset materials to proof. He was given broad freedom to select what he wanted to publish; he reported to Silberkleit's chief editor, Abner J. Sundell.

In 1941, Silberkleit essentially consolidated all his pulp publishing companies under the Columbia Publications umbrella. Extant titles Columbia took on that year included Famous Western, Science Fiction, Hooded Detective (started in 1938 under a different title), Future Fiction, Sports Winners and Super Sports. At that point, in mid-1941, Robert A. W. Lowndes came on board, becoming Columbia's lead editor. In late 1941, Silberkleit merged Science Fiction with Future Fiction.

Two years later Columbia cancelled both Future and Science Fiction Quarterly (launched in 1941), deciding to use the limited paper they could acquire for their line of Western and detective titles instead. (The U.S.'s 1941–1942 entry into World War II brought about a paper shortage, which equally effected other pulp publications.) Both magazines, as well as Science Fiction, were revived in the 1950s.

In addition to pulp magazines, Columbia published a few paperback books, most notably Noel Loomis' City of Glass (1955) (a "Double Action Pocketbook"; originally published in 1942 as a shorter piece in Standard Magazines' Startling Stories) and the five-issue series Science Fiction Classics (1942), which included novellas by Earl Binder and Otto Binder writing as "John Coleridge," and John Russell Fearn writing as "Dennis Clive".

As television supplanted magazines as the dominant form of mass entertainment in the 1950s, the pulps suffered from slumping sales. In February 1960, when Columbia's distributor refused to carry any more of the company's titles, that signaled the end of Columbia Publications.

Silberkleit, Coyne, and fellow Archie founder John L. Goldwater immediately founded Belmont Books, a low-rent paperback publisher devoted to science fiction, horror, and mystery titles. In its early years, Belmont published a number of science fiction anthologies that featured content from Science Fiction, Future Fiction, Science Fiction Quarterly, and Dynamic Science Fiction, all of which had been published by Columbia Publications.

== Gerald G. Swan reprints ==
British publisher Gerald G. Swan (1902–1980) published 16 issues of Swan American Magazine from 1946 to 1950, the contents of which were culled from Columbia Publications titles. The Swan issues focused on Western and detective titles, with a couple of science fiction-themed issues thrown in. Five individual issues of Swan American Magazine were devoted to material reprinted from Columbia's Famous Western, two to Western Yarns, and two to Complete Cowboy.

Swan American Magazines issues:

1. Western Yarns (1948)
2. Detective Yarns (1948)
3. Crack Detective Stories (1948)
4. Famous Western (1948)
5. Western Yarns (1948)
6. Famous Western (1948
7. Hooded Detective (1948)
8. Famous Western (1948)
9. Crack Detective (1948)
10. Famous Western (1948)
11. Future Fantasy and Science Fiction (1948)
12. Complete Cowboy Wild Western Stories
13. Famous Western
14. Complete Cowboy Wild Western Stories
15. Science Fiction Quarterly (1950)
16. Black Hood Detective (1950)

In 1960, Swan also published three issues of Weird and Occult Library, which mostly featured old stories from Columbia's science fiction pulps.

== Titles published ==
Title	Genre	Imprint	1st pub. date	last pub. date	Notes
Action-Packed Western	Western	Chesterfield; Columbia	1937 October; 1954 July	1939 December; 1958 May	published by Chesterfield in the 1930s and Columbia in the 1950s
Adventure Yarns	Adventure	Columbia	1938 August	1938 December	
Air Action	Adventure	Double Action	1938 December	1940 September	later known as Sky Raiders
All Sports Magazine	Sports	Columbia	1939 October; 1948 November	1944/1945 Winter; 1951 September	
Blue Ribbon Sports	Sports	Blue Ribbon	1937 December	1940 October	
Blue Ribbon Western	Western	Blue Ribbon; Double Action; Columbia	1937 July	1950 April/May	published by Blue Ribbon from July 1937–(Jan.) 1940, by Double Action from (Feb.) 1940–Sept. 1940, then picked up by Columbia
Complete Cowboy	Western	Columbia	1939 January	1950 April/May	later known as Complete Cowboy Novel Magazine
Complete Northwest Novel Magazine	Adventure	Northwest	1935 September	1940 April	later called Complete Northwest Magazine and then Complete Northwest
Cowboy Romances	Western	Blue Ribbon	1937 August	1938 July	
Cowboy Short Stories	Western	Blue Ribbon	1938? October	1940 September	
Detective and Murder Mysteries	Detective	Blue Ribbon; Columbia	1939 (March)	1941 February	published by Blue Ribbon from Mar.–Nov. 1939, then continued by Columbia
Detective Yarns	Detective	Blue Ribbon; Columbia	1938 June	1957 July	later known successively as Black Hood Detective, Hooded Detective, Crack Detective, Crack Detective Stories, Famous Detective, Famous Detective Stories, and Crack Detective and Mystery Stories
Double Action Detective Stories	Detective	Columbia	1954	1960	later known as Double Action Detective and Mystery Stories
Double-Action Gang Magazine	Detective	Winford	1936 May	1939 July	later known as True Gangster Stories
Double Action Western Magazine	Western	Winford; Columbia	1934 September	1960 May	published by Winford from Sept. 1934–Nov. 1939
Dynamic Science Fiction	Science fiction	Columbia	1952 December	1954 January	
Famous Western	Western	Blue Ribbon; Double Action; Columbia	1937 May	1960	published by Blue Ribbon from 1937–Apr. 1940, by Double Action from July 1940–Spring 1941, then picked up by Columbia
Future Science Fiction	Science fiction	Blue Ribbon; Double Action; Columbia	1939; 1950 May	1943 July; 1960 April	Published by Blue Ribbon as Future Fiction Nov. 1939–Aug. 1941, then continued by Double Action as Future Combined with Science Fiction from Oct. 1941–Aug. 1942, and then Columbia
Gay Love Stories	Romance	Columbia	1943 April	1960 Summer	title refers to "gay" in the sense "lighthearted and carefree"
Ideal Love	Romance	Columbia	1941 April	1960 February	later known as Ideal Love Stories
Intimate Confessions	Romance	Blue Ribbon	1937 September	1938 November	
Mystery Novels and Short Stories	Detective	Double Action	1939 September	1941 September	
Personal Confessions	Romance	Blue Ribbon	1938 March	1938 November	
Real Western	Western	Winford; Columbia	1935 January	1960 April	published by Winford from Jan. 1935–Sept. 1939; later known as Real Western Stories
Real Western Romances	Western	Columbia	1949 December	1960 December	later known as Western Romances
Romantic Love Secrets	Romance	Blue Ribbon; Double Action; Columbia	1938 July	1959 September	published beginning in July 1933 by Graham Publications as Romantic Love Secrets Magazine; later known as Romantic Love (Double Action) and Today's Love Stories (Columbia)
Science Fiction	Science fiction	Blue Ribbon; Double Action; Columbia	1939 March; 1955 January	1941 September; 1960 May	published by Double Action from Mar. 1940–Jan. 1941, then merged with Future Fiction under the title Future Combined with Science Fiction
Science Fiction Quarterly	Science fiction	Double Action; Columbia	1940 Summer; 1951 May	1943 Spring; 1958 February	
Sky Raiders	Adventure	Columbia	1942 December	1944 Summer	
Smashing Detective Stories	Detective	Columbia	1951 March	1958 February	later known as Fast Action Detective and Mystery Stories
Smashing Novels Magazine	Adventure	Winford; Chesterfield; Columbia	1936 May	1939 December	published under Winford Publications from May 1936–Apr. 1939, then title changed to Adventure Novel and picked up by Chesterfield from Feb. 1937–Jan. 1938, then picked up by Columbia and title changed to Adventure Novels and Short Stories
Smashing Western	Western	Chesterfield	1936 September	1939 October	
Sports Fiction	Sports	Blue Ribbon; Columbia	1938 April	1951 September	
Sports Winners	Sports	Blue Ribbon; Double Action; Columbia	1938 April	1952 April	published by Double Action from June 1940–Jan. 1941
Super Sports	Sports	Blue Ribbon; Columbia	1939 March	1957	published by Blue Ribbon from Mar. 1939–Oct. 1941
Ten Story Gang	Detective	Winford; Double Action	1938 August	1940 September	published by Double Action as Gangland Detective Stories from Nov. 1939–Sept. 1940
Undercover Detective	Detective	Double Action	1938 December	1939 April	
Western Action Novels Magazine	Western	Winford; Columbia	1936 March	1960 April	published by Winford from Mar. 1936–Feb. 1940, then by Columbia as Western Action
Western Love Story Magazine	Western	Blue Ribbon	1938 May	1938 December	
Western Yarns	Western	Columbia	1938 January	1944 Spring	
