= Edward D. Hoch =

American writer

- Born: Edward Dentinger Hoch; February 22, 1930; Rochester, New York
- Died: January 17, 2008 (aged 77); Rochester, New York
- Education: Aquinas Institute of Rochester (?–1947)
- Alma mater: University of Rochester (1947–1949)
- Occupation: author
- Writing career
- Pen name: Irwin Booth, Stephen Dentinger, Pat McMahon, R. L. Stevens, Anthony Circus
- Period: 1955–2008
- Genre: Detective fiction

Edward Dentinger Hoch (February 22, 1930 – January 17, 2008) was an American writer of detective fiction. Although he wrote several novels, he was primarily known for his vast output of over 950 short stories. He was one of the few American fiction writers of his generation who supported himself financially through short story publication, rather than novels or screenplays.

== Early life and career ==
Hoch (pronounced hoke) was born in Rochester, New York, the son of Alice Ann Hoch (née Dentinger) and Earl George Hoch, a banker who outlasted both the Wall Street Crash and subsequent Depression. Graduating from the Aquinas Institute of Rochester in 1947, Edward attended the University of Rochester for two years before dropping out in 1949. He enlisted in the Army the following year, serving as a military policeman at Fort Jay on Governor's Island in New York Harbor. After his discharge in 1952, Hoch remained in New York City for another year, working at Pocket Books, Inc. Returning to New Rochelle, he began working at Hutchins Advertising Company as a copy and public relations writer, in which capacity he remained for roughly 15 years, until transitioning to strictly fiction writing in 1968.

Hoch began writing in the 1950s; his first story appeared in 1955 in Famous Detective Stories and was followed by stories in The Saint Mystery Magazine. In January 1962, he began appearing in Alfred Hitchcock's Mystery Magazine. In December 1962, he kicked off his most successful collaboration, with the appearance of his first story in Ellery Queen's Mystery Magazine; in the years since EQMM has published over 450 of Hoch's stories, roughly half of his total output. In May 1973, EQMM began publishing a new Hoch story in every monthly issue; as of May 2007, the author had gone an astonishing 34 years without missing a single issue.

Other magazines Hoch wrote for included Adventure, Double-Action Detective, Isaac Asimov's Science Fiction Magazine, Mike Shayne Mystery Magazine, The Magazine of Horror and Web Detective Stories.

Hoch was a master of the classic detective story, emphasizing mystery and deduction rather than suspense and fast action; EQMM has called him "The King of the Classical Whodunit." His stories are regarded as very well written and are usually tightly plotted puzzles, with carefully and fairly presented clues, both physical and psychological. He was particularly partial to "impossible crime" tales, where to all appearances the crime (usually a murder) could not have been committed at all; he invented numerous variants on the locked room mystery popularized by John Dickson Carr and others. For instance, in "The Second Problem of the Covered Bridge", a man is shot at close range while alone on a covered bridge, while crowds of witnesses watch both ends of the bridge. Hoch cited Graham Greene, John Dickson Carr, Ellery Queen and Jorge Luis Borges as influences on his fiction, and reportedly took great pride in the compliment Carr paid him in a review of the 1970 anthology, Ellery Queen's Grand Slam: 25 Stories from Ellery Queen's Mystery Magazine.

Let prejudice speak. My concern is with who and how and seldom with why. Therefore, in one person's opinion, the prize should go to the very first story, "Murder Offstage," a short-short by Edward D. Hoch; Satan himself could be proud of its ingenuity.

Hoch also published magazine stories under the names "Stephen Dentinger", "R. L. Stevens", "Pat McMahon", "Anthony Circus", "Irwin Booth", "R. E. Porter", "Mr. X" and the House Name "Ellery Queen". In many cases, he also had a story under his own name in the same magazine issue. Hoch also wrote a novel The Blue Movie Murders published as Ellery Queen, under the supervision and editing of Manfred Lee, half of the writing partnership known as Ellery Queen.

In the early 1980s, Hoch outlined three paperback original mystery novels with Otto Penzler which were then ghost-written by other authors. The novels were published without the detective's solution and offered a $15,000 cash prize to the first reader to solve the mystery.

In 2001, Hoch was named a Grand Master by the Mystery Writers of America, the first time a Grand Master was known primarily for short fiction rather than novels.

While the vast majority of his output belonged to the mystery genre, Hoch also produced some crossover fantasy and science fiction, mainly in the form of the Simon Ark and Computer Cops; early in his career, he also wrote a small number of non-series fantasy stories. An anthology of his SF stories was released in 2016.

Hoch, a Catholic, died at home in Rochester of a heart attack, aged 77. His wife, née Patricia McMahon, was his only immediate survivor.

== Series stories ==
The overwhelming majority of Hoch's stories feature series characters. He has created at least a dozen different series of stories for EQMM alone. His Captain Leopold series reached over 100 stories.

=== Nick Velvet ===
Nick Velvet is a professional thief for hire, with a peculiar specialty: for a flat fee, he steals only objects of negligible apparent value. Since his first appearance in EQMM in September 1966, he has stolen such things as an old spiderweb (which he was then obliged to replace), a day-old newspaper, and a used teabag. His original fee for a theft was $20,000. In 1980 he raised it to $25,000 at the urging of his long-time girlfriend Gloria (who met Nick in 1965 when he was burgling her New York apartment); in the 21st century his fee has risen to $50,000. Unlike many fictional thieves, Nick usually works alone on his thefts—in fact, until 1979 Gloria believed that Nick worked for the U.S. government.

The Nick Velvet caper stories generally combine a near-impossible theft with the mystery of why someone would pay $20,000 to have an apparently valueless item stolen. Although Nick often appears as devoid of curiosity as his targets are of value, circumstances usually force him to identify his clients' true motives, making him as much of a detective as Hoch's more conventional characters. Most of the Nick Velvet stories have a light and humorous tone reminiscent of Leslie Charteris' early stories of the Saint. The fundamental immorality of Nick's chosen profession is frequently offset by the larger justice resulting from his detective work.

A Nick Velvet story, "The Theft of the Circus Poster" in May 1973, began Hoch's unbroken string of monthly appearances in EQMM. Another story, "The Theft of the Rusty Bookmark" in January 1998 featured the real-life Mysterious Bookshop of New York City, and its real-life owner (and Edgar-winning publisher and editor), Otto Penzler. "The Theft of Gloria's Greatcoat" (May 1998), which describes the first meeting of Nick and Gloria, is unusual in that it is told in the first person by Gloria; all of the other Nick Velvet stories (and indeed the majority of Hoch's stories) are third-person narratives.

=== Captain Leopold ===
Captain Jules Leopold is a police detective, the head of the Violent Crimes Squad of the police department for the fictional city of Monroe, Connecticut, a city apparently modeled on Hoch's own home town, Rochester, New York, in Monroe County, New York. Along with his colleagues Lieutenant Fletcher and Sergeant Connie Trent, he is one of Hoch's most conventional characters. The Leopold stories are police procedurals on the surface, showing the interaction of the officers as they investigate crimes, but the crimes themselves are frequently unusual and reflect Hoch's skill at plotting and placement of clues. The story outcomes usually depend on the deductive ability of Leopold and his comrades rather than on straightforward police work, and sometimes feature impossible crimes and locked rooms.

The Leopold stories best illustrate one of the attractions of Hoch's series tales: The characters age and alter realistically with time. In the course of the series, Leopold has divorced, remarried, retired, returned to work, and retired a second time. Lieutenant Fletcher has been promoted to captain to replace him, and Connie Trent has been promoted to Lieutenant. In some of the recent stories, the focus is on Fletcher and Trent, with Leopold only acting as a respected adviser.

Leopold first appeared as a subsidiary character in a 1957 story. In "The Theft of Leopold's Badge" in March 1991, Hoch brought Captain Leopold and Nick Velvet together in the same story.

EQMM has published the majority of the Leopold stories, but a number have appeared in AHMM as well. The Edgar-winning "The Oblong Room", perhaps the most frequently reprinted Leopold story, was first published in The Saint Magazine.

=== Dr. Sam Hawthorne ===
Dr. Sam Hawthorne is a retired family practitioner who is also a specialist in impossible murders. His tales are told as reminiscences of his small-town medical practice in the 1920s, 1930s, and 1940s. Sam Hawthorne tries to live a quiet life in the fictional New England town of Northmont, but wherever he goes someone always seems to die in a most improbable way.

First appearing in 1974, the Dr. Sam Hawthorne stories are carefully researched historical pieces, rich with period details about Sam's cars, medical practices of the times, politics, and clothing. The stories of this series are among Hoch's most humane tales: Sam himself is a cheerful fellow and tells his tales with humor, but his first-person narratives give readers a close look at his distress at the murders he investigates and his sympathy for the survivors. Because most of the tales take place in a single small town, the series has a larger-than-usual cast of recurring minor characters.

Each Hawthorne story is a "locked room mystery", where an impossible crime occurs, usually a murder.

The earlier tales of the series include one peculiar device: Each one ends with a hint about the next story's central puzzle, and each one begins with a reference to the previous story's hint. Such a device is sometimes inserted when stories are anthologized, to make them seem more like a continuous narrative, but it is very unusual in the initial publication of independent stories in a series.

In "The Problem of Suicide Cottage" (EQMM, July 2007), it is revealed old Sam is 80 years old, and has a daughter named Samantha. He is telling his stories in 1976, and was born in 1896.

=== Rand ===
Jeffery (sometimes Jeffrey) Rand is a code and cipher expert, formerly with the Department of Concealed Communications of British intelligence. The Rand stories take place in exotic locations around the world, and frequently feature secret messages or codes. After he left Concealed Communications, many of his stories involved his half-Egyptian, half-Scots wife, Lella Gaad, who Rand met in "The Spy and The Nile Mermaid". Rand met another Hoch character, Michael Vlado, in "The Spy and the Gypsy".

=== Simon Ark ===
Simon Ark was the protagonist of Hoch's first published story and ultimately featured in more than 39 short stories, which Hoch first collected in 1984. Ark appears to be an ordinary man in his sixties, tall and stout, but in many of the stories Ark implies that he is actually over 2000 years old, a Coptic priest who travels the world looking for evil—specifically, Satan. It is said that he is cursed by God, that when Jesus carrying the cross wanted to rest, Ark refused him rest and in turn has never known rest himself, doomed to wander the globe forever (although at least one story suggests Ark was instead the author of a fraudulent gospel so pious that God was unable to punish him with hell or reward him with heaven, and so left him on the Earth instead). However the immortality element is not played up in any way and is just incidental.

The Simon Ark stories have supernatural occult themes, although the crimes in them are always found to have been committed by mundane means. In the introduction to his 1984 collection, Hoch left the matter of Simon Ark's real nature a matter for the reader to ponder. The 1984 volume presents what Hoch deemed to be the nine best of the 39 stories that he devoted to Simon Ark; it concludes with a list of all 39 stories, giving details of their original publications. (There were 39 stories as of 1984. He wrote others subsequently.)

=== Ben Snow ===
Ben Snow features in a series of American Old West mysteries set around the start of the 20th century. Like the Dr. Sam Hawthorne series, these tales are carefully researched historical pieces, sometimes including real historical characters such as Butch Cassidy. He met another Hoch character, Sam Hawthorne, in "The Problem of the Haunted Teepee".

The first Ben Snow series appeared in 1961 in The Saint Mystery Magazine; the series has since been continued in EQMM.

=== Stanton and Ives ===
Walt Stanton and Juliet Ives are two Princeton graduates turned international couriers that have appeared in newer stories, beginning with "Courier and Ives" in November 2002. The pair are often sent to pick up or retrieve an item, and end up picking up the mystery around it.

=== Sir Gideon Parrot ===
Sir Gideon Parrot (pronounced parroe) is Hoch's humorous tribute to the detectives of the Golden Age of mystery fiction, particularly Agatha Christie's Hercule Poirot and John Dickson Carr's Dr. Gideon Fell. These stories are gentle parodies of classic mystery devices, the ones so overused they have become cliches.

=== Michael Vlado ===
Michael Vlado is the young king of a Romany (Gypsy) tribe in contemporary eastern Europe.

=== Alexander Swift ===
Alexander Swift, one of Hoch's later creations, is an intelligence agent for General George Washington during the American Revolutionary War. The stories comprise more nearly a serial than a series, as Swift probes ever deeper into rumors that the fort of West Point, commanded by General Benedict Arnold, houses a traitor who will betray the fort to the British Army. In the last Swift story, "Swift Among the Pirates", Swift travels to England, to discover Benedict Arnold is dead.

=== Barney Hamet ===
Barney Hamet is a mystery writer who stumbles into real mysteries when he attends mystery conventions. Hamet also featured in Hoch's 1969 novel The Shattered Raven.

=== Susan Holt ===
Susan Holt is a minor executive, in charge of promotions for a department store chain.

=== Interpol ===
The Interpol stories were published in the 1970s and 1980s. Interpol officers Sebastian Blue and Laura Charme investigated cases of international crime in Europe.

=== Al Darlan ===
Al Darlan (originally Al Diamond; Hoch decided to change the character's name after the earliest stories to avoid confusion with radio/TV detective Richard Diamond) is a private investigator whose appearances have been sparse. His last appearance was in the May 2008 issue of EQMM.

=== David Piper ===
David Piper, aka "The Manhunter", is the head of the Department of Apprehension.

=== Father David Noone ===
Roman Catholic priest who worked in an inner city parish.

== Novels ==
- The Shattered Raven, 1970. ISBN 0709112300
  Barney Hamet investigates a murder at the Mystery Writers of America.
- The Blue Movie Murders, 1973. ISBN 0575015950
  (as Ellery Queen). "Trouble shooter" Mike McCall investigates the murder of a film producer.
- Prize Meets Murder, 1984. ISBN 0671509888
  (as R.T. Edwards). Outlined by Hoch, ghost-written by Ron Goulart.
- The Medical Center Murders, 1984. ISBN 9780671523626
  (as Lisa Drake). Outlined by Hoch, ghost-written by Thomas Gifford.
- This Prize Is Dangerous, 1985. ISBN 9780352317247
  (as Matthew Prize). Outlined by Hoch, ghost-written by Ron Goulart.

=== Computer Cops series ===
These three science fiction novels, set in the mid-21st century, feature Carl Crader and Earl Jazine of the Computer Investigation Bureau, nicknamed the "Computer Cops".

- The Transvection Machine, 1971. ISBN 0802755399
- The Fellowship of the Hand, 1973. ISBN 0802755534
- The Frankenstein Factory, 1975. ISBN 0446768618

The series had begun with a short story ("Computer Cops"), written for the 1969 anthology Crime Prevention in the 30th Century.

== Short story collections ==
- City of Brass and Other Simon Ark Stories (Simon Ark), 1971, Leisure Books. ISBN 0843900296
- The Judges of Hades (Simon Ark), 1971, Leisure Books. ISBN 0843900334
- Ellery Queen Presents the Spy and the Thief (Rand / Nick Velvet), ed. Queen, 1971, Davis Publications. LCCN 72099895
- The Thefts of Nick Velvet (Nick Velvet), 1978, Mysterious Press. ISBN 0892960353
- The Quests of Simon Ark (Simon Ark), 1984, Mysterious Press. ISBN 0892961139
- Leopold's Way (Captain Leopold), ed. Nevins & Greenberg, 1985, Southern Illinois University Press. ISBN 0809312336
- The Spy Who Read Latin and Other Stories (Rand), 1990, Mysterious Press.
- The Night, My Friend (non-series), ed. Nevins, 1992, Ohio University Press. ISBN 0821410113
- Diagnosis: Impossible (Dr. Sam Hawthorne), 1996, Crippen & Landru. ISBN 1885941021
- The Ripper of Storyville and Other Ben Snow Tales (Ben Snow), 1997, Crippen & Landru. ISBN 1885941196
- The Velvet Touch (Nick Velvet), 2000, Crippen & Landru. ISBN 1885941420
- The Old Spies Club and Other Intrigues of Rand (Rand), 2001, Crippen & Landru. ISBN 1885941609
- The Night People (non-series), 2001, Five Star Publishing. ISBN 0786231467
- The Iron Angel and Other Tales of the Gypsy Sleuth (Michael Vlado), 2003, Crippen & Landru. ISBN 1885941919
- More Things Impossible (Dr. Sam Hawthorne), 2006, Crippen & Landru. ISBN 1932009493
- The Sherlock Holmes Stories of Edward D. Hoch, (Sherlock Holmes), 2008, Mysterious Press.
- Nothing Is Impossible (Dr. Sam Hawthorne), 2014, Crippen & Landru. ISBN 1936363038
- The Future Is Ours, The Science Fiction Stories of Edward D. Hoch, ed. Steven Steinbock, 2016, Wildside Press. ISBN 1479407305
- All but Impossible (Dr. Sam Hawthorne), 2017, Crippen & Landru. ISBN 1936363224
- Challenge the Impossible (Dr. Sam Hawthorne), 2018, Crippen & Landru. ISBN 1936363291
- Hoch's Ladies (Susan Holt, Libby Knowles, Annie Sears), 2019, Crippen & Landru. ISBN 1936363429
- Funeral in the Fog (Simon Ark), 2020, Crippen & Landru. ISBN 1936363488
- Constant Hearses and Other Revolutionary Mysteries (Alexander Swift, Gideon Parrot), 2022, Crippen & Landru. ISBN 193636364X
- The Killer Everyone Knew and Other Captain Leopold Stories (Captain Leopold), 2023, Crippen & Landru. ISBN 1936363771
- The Will o' the Wisp (David Piper, Father David Noone), 2024, Crippen & Landru. ISBN 1936363879
- The Case of the Flying Graveyard and Other Stories (Interpol), 2026, Crippen & Landru. ISBN 1971489042

== Collections edited by Hoch ==
- Dear Dead Days, 1972, Littlehampton Book Services. ISBN 0575017732
- Best Detective Stories of the Year, 1976 through 1981, Dutton
- All But Impossible! An Anthology of Locked Room & Impossible Crime Stories by Members of the Mystery Writers of America, 1981, Robert Hale Limited. ISBN 0709007795
- The Year's Best Mystery and Suspense Stories, 1982 through 1995, Walker & Co.
- Murder Most Sacred: Great Catholic Tales of Mystery and Suspense, 1989, Random House Value Publishing. ISBN 0517061597
- Twelve American Detective Stories, 1997, Oxford University Press. ISBN 0192880640

== Awards ==
- 1968 Edgar Allan Poe Award (Mystery Writers of America): "The Oblong Room", The Saint Mystery Magazine, July 1967
- 1998 Anthony Award (Bouchercon World Mystery Convention): "One Bag of Coconuts", EQMM, November 1997
- 2001 Anthony Award (Bouchercon): "The Problem of the Potting Shed", EQMM, July 2000
- 2007 Ellery Queen Readers Choice Award (awarded 2008): "The Theft of the Ostracized Ostrich", EQMM, June 2007
- Lifetime Achievement Award (Private Eye Writers of America), 2000
- Grand Master (Mystery Writers of America), 2001
- Lifetime Achievement Award (Bouchercon), 2001
