= Common Time =

- Short story by James Blish
- Country: United Kingdom
- Language: English
- Genre(s): Science fiction

Publication
- Published in: Science Fiction Quarterly
- Publication type: Periodical
- Media type: Print (magazine, hardback and paperback)
- Publication date: August 1953

"Common Time" is a science fiction short story by American writer James Blish. It first appeared in the August 1953 issue of Science Fiction Quarterly and has been reprinted several times: in the 1959 short-story collection Galactic Cluster; in The Testament of Andros (1965); in The Penguin Science Fiction Omnibus (1973); and in Isaac Asimov Presents the Great SF Stories.

The story is considered to be an archetype of symbolism in science fiction.

== Synopsis ==
A man named Garrard is a test pilot for an experimental space ship bound for Alpha Centauri. Previous attempts to make the trip have failed. Garrard is put in the ship in suspended animation and wakes up after the ship has gone into "over-drive". The first thing he remembers is the injunction: "Don't move". Garrard realizes that ship time seems to be almost stopped relative to his conscious time; he is not breathing, and his muscles respond slowly to mental directions. He calculates that 6000 years of subjective time will pass before the ship reaches its goal. Suddenly, he realizes that ship time is speeding up, until it equals, then exceeds, his subjective time. As the differential time rates increase, he again loses control of his body and goes into "pseudo-death".

Garrard awakes as the ship comes out of overdrive near Alpha Centauri. Around him in the space ship is a group of dreamlike beings that call themselves "the clinesterton beademungen" and speak to him in dream-language, which he understands perfectly. The story's narrative also becomes dreamlike at this point, suggesting that Garrard's experiences are indescribable. As the ship's automatic mechanism is about to start the journey back to Earth, Garrard again goes into pseudo-death, and remains in that state until the ship nears Earth. He lands safely. He can no longer remember what the "beademung" was like or even if it was real, but he has a haunting sense of loss.

== Symbolism ==
In In Search of Wonder, Damon Knight argues that the story is a symbolic representation of fertilization of a female ovum by a sperm, and that the protagonist Garrard is the sperm. The Earth represents the testes; Alpha Centauri is the uterus; and the beademung is the ovum. Furthermore, Knight argues, the first part of the story, which contains all the intercourse symbolism, is told backwards. Even the title, Knight argues, is an unintentional pun for "Come on time".

== Author's commentary ==
James Blish (quoted by Damon Knight) said about Knight's interpretation of his story:

The reference to the Alpha Centauri stars as 'the twin radioceles' obviously comes from varicocele, a common form of hernia involving the testicles, and I think now that the whole thing was suggested by the Earth-Moon balls on the cover around which I wrote the story. The main Alpha Centauri star and Proxima Centauri stand in about the same relationship as the Earth and the Moon, and both pairs might be described as one-hung-low. Also, the story is about love-and-death; it says it is. But I'm just now beginning to believe it. Writing frightens me.
