= Maurice Coyne (publisher) =

Publisher; co-founder of Archie Comics

- Born: Morris Cohen; September 15, 1901; New York City, U.S.
- Died: May 9, 1971 (aged 69); New York City, U.S.
- Occupations: Publisher, accountant, business manager
- Known for: Co-founder of Columbia Publications; Co-founder of Archie Comics; Co-founder of Belmont Books
- Title: CFO (Archie)
- Spouse: Ruth

Maurice Coyne (born Morris Cohen, September 15, 1901 – May 9, 1971) was an American publisher of magazines, books, and comic books; together with Louis Silberkleit and John L. Goldwater, he co-founded the company that became known as Archie Comics. With Silberkleit and Goldwater, Coyne also published pulp magazines as part of Columbia Publications, and paperback originals with Belmont Books.

== Biography ==
Maurice Coyne was born Morris Cohen in the Bronx, New York City. He graduated from high school in 1918 and college in 1924 (where he studied accounting). He soon had his own practice in lower Manhattan at 147 Nassau Street, where he was also a CPA and a tax accountant.

Coyne's first business affiliation with Silberkleit and Goldwater was in 1934 with their pulp magazine publisher Winford Publications; Coyne served as silent partner and business manager. Winford published such titles as Double Action Western, Real Western, Mystery Novels, Underworld Detective, and Complete Northwest Novel Magazine; it eventually became part of the partners' Columbia Publications.

In 1939, in response to the popularity of Superman and Action Comics, Silberkleit, Goldwater, and Coyne founded the comic book publisher MLJ Magazines. The name was derived from the initials of the first names of Maurice Coyne, Louis Silberkleit, and John Goldwater. Coyne served as MLJ's bookkeeper and CFO. After starting out as a publisher of superhero comics, MLJ Magazines produced the first Archie Comics in the winter of 1942, described by The New York Times as "a series of comic books detailing the antics of Archie and his teen-age friends." Archie soon became MLJ Magazine's headliner, which led to the company changing its name to "Archie Comic Publications".

Columbia Publications lasted until 1960, at which point Silberkleit, Goldwater, and Coyne immediately founded Belmont Books, a low-rent publisher of paperback originals in the science fiction, horror, and mystery genres.

Coyne retired as CFO of Archie in 1970. He died aged 69 in May 1971, survived by his wife Ruth.
