= Lloyd Kropp =

American novelist (1937–2023)

- Born: Lloyd Edward Kropp; Grand Rapids, Michigan
- Died: July 27, 2023; Edwardsville, IL
- Occupations: Novelist; educator; composer; musician
- Writing career
- Notable works: One Hundred Times to China, Greencastle

Lloyd Edward Kropp (July 16, 1937 – July 27, 2023) was an American novelist, composer, and educator. Kropp achieved popular acclaim after the publication of his third and fourth novels One Hundred Times to China and Greencastle. Greencastle was nominated for a Penn/Faulkner Award and was named to one of the American Library Association's "Best Books of the Year" lists in 1985. For this novel the author received the "Illinois Author of the Year" award from the Illinois Association of Teachers of English (IATE). His books have been favorably reviewed in many journals and newspapers in the United States, Great Britain, and Spain.

== Career ==
Kropp was born in Grand Rapids, Michigan and attended both the University of Pittsburgh and Ohio State University. His first short story was published in a university magazine and he also published poems and critical essays in a small-press journals. Never very prolific as a writer of short stories, Kropp developed an early discipline for the novel form. His first novel, The Drift, was published in hardcover in 1969 (Doubleday) and in another hardcover edition in Great Britain (Victor Gollancz) and enjoyed mass market paperback reprints in 1971 (Belmont Books) and 1979 (Leisure Books). The story is a fantasy based on an old nautical legend about an island made of derelict ships floating in the Sargasso Sea. For the denizens of the island, land is only a legend. The Drift was the first property acquired by Michael Douglas' film production company, Bigstick Productions, in November 1969.

Kropp's second novel, Who Is Mary Stark?, was published in hardcover (Doubleday) in 1974 and in paperback (Avon) in 1980. In Madrid it was republished by Martinez-Roca translated into Spanish. The plot of Who Is Mary Stark? centers around a mysterious woman who commits suicide in a mental hospital and the subsequent attempt of two young men to discover what part she played in their respective lives years earlier. Instead of moving chronologically, the novel moves in reverse toward the secret of the woman's identity. Who Is Mary Stark? garnered many positive reviews in journals and newspapers across the United States.

Kropp's 1979 opus, One Hundred Times to China was also published by Doubleday and became a staple of many American high schools' required reading lists. Although not a novel targeted toward young adults, the book was very popular with a generation of literate young readers throughout the 1980s and 1990s. This post-apocalyptic tale of a man trying to shepherd his wife and children to the safety of a secret mountain cabin resonates with Kropp's impeccably crafted tension and trademark gentleness, with a focus on humanity's better angels.

In 1987 Kropp published Greencastle (Freundlich Books), the award-winning novel for which he is best known. A lyrical coming-of-age story set in the early 1950s, Greencastle tells the tale of three boys who love mystery and science fiction. Roger, the protagonist, organizes a club called The Denizens of the Sacred Crypt. He finds that in his small, conservative New Jersey town, he must face down bigotry, class-struggles, teen-age cruelty, and serious misunderstandings at the hands of his school teachers. In spite of some strange and unsettling events, Greencastle is a nostalgic look at a lost world.

In the late 1960s Lloyd Kropp taught for two years at Otterbein College. From 1970 to 1975 He taught in the Creative Writing program at the University of North Carolina at Greensboro where he also taught American Literature, Victorian Literature, and a course of his own design in fantasy and science fiction. In 1975 he joined the English faculty at Southern Illinois University Edwardsville where he taught until he retired as a senior professor in 2002. While at SIUE he taught a wide range of courses: fiction and poetry writing, The American Novel, Shakespeare, American Literature, Victorian Literature, Classical Mythology, Literary Criticism, Literary Editing, Egyptian Hieroglyphs, summer seminars in Creativity and Composition for high school teachers, and courses in music and writing for psychotic adolescents at the Alton Mental Health Clinic. His formal academic specialty was in Literary Theory. During his years teaching at SIUE he won a Distinguished Performance Award from the School of Humanities and was twice nominated for the Distinguished Teaching Award.

== Other projects ==
Kropp was also an accomplished musician and composer. In addition to his concert work, he composed the background score for Lawrence Lee's The American as Faust, which was performed in concert in Pittsburgh and also broadcast on Public Television.

== Later life ==
In 2007 Kropp lectured around the country, including at the Archon (convention) in Collinsville, Illinois where he gave a presentation on "Ancient Egypt: an Alien Mind." At the Society for the Study of Egyptian Antiquities at the University of Toronto, Kropp lectured on "How Does a Story Mean?: Narrative Structure in an Ancient Egyptian Tale."

His fourth novel, Greencastle, is currently in development with a major motion picture company. He has written two additional novels, The Book of Thoth and Lady of the Lake, both of which are currently in submission. His latest project is The Devil at Simon Episcopus, the story of a brutal murder at a conservative Christian college somewhere in the Midwest.

Kropp was still composing music and working as a cafe pianist at Nerudas in Edwardsville, Illinois.

He was married to Dr. Carolyn Kropp, a former dancer and teacher at the English Department at SIUE. They have two children.

At the age of 86, Kropp died on July 27, 2023, in Edwardsville, Illinois, after a long battle with Alzheimer's disease.

== Bibliography ==
- The Drift (1969)
- Who Is Mary Stark (1974)
- One Hundred Times to China (1979)
- Greencastle (1987)

== Quotes ==
"Writing is a lonely profession. Teaching gives my life a kind of resonance. It's nice to reaffirm the idea that you're part of something, that you contribute to other people's understanding of things directly. There's a sense of being part of a community, and I think a lot of writers don't have that."

"...he wondered now if the reason that he could not find his consciousness was that not all of it was inside of him. Perhaps consciousness was not a thing, but a meeting place. It was like Pangborn's bookstore. You wandered through the Forest of Symbols. You reached out to the books, and the books reached out to you, and the meeting place was a magic space somewhere in between." —excerpted from Greencastle
