= Fantasy Fan =

American literary magazine

The Fantasy Fan
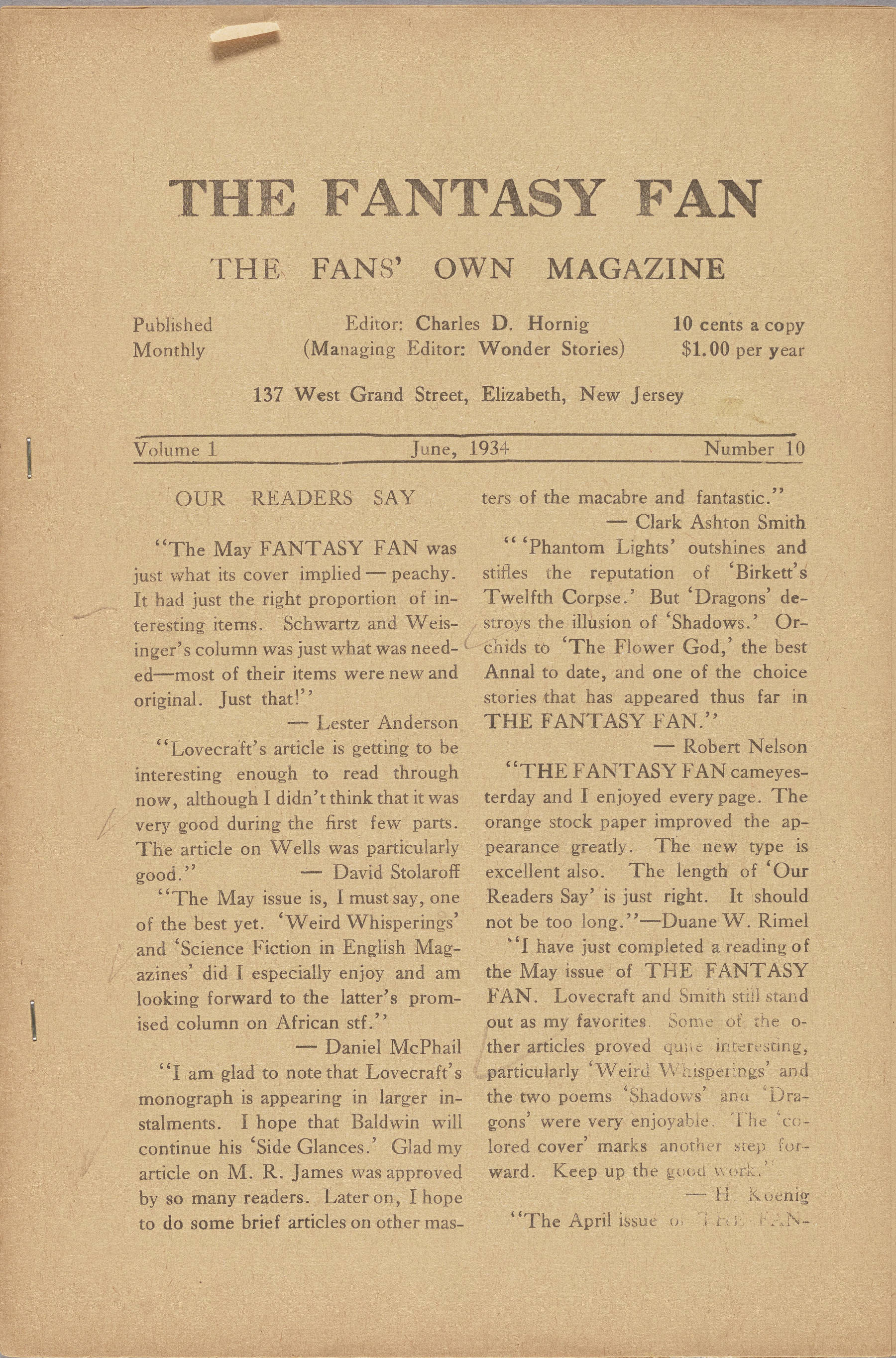
- The Fantasy Fan Vol 1 No 10, cover dated June 1934
- Editor: Charles Hornig
- Categories: Fiction, Literature
- Frequency: Monthly
- Circulation: 60
- Publisher: Charles Hornig
- First issue: September 1933
- Final issue Number: February 1935; Vol 2 No 6
- Country: United States
- Language: English

The Fantasy Fan was the first fan magazine in the weird fiction field and therefore holds an important place in the history of the American fantasy and horror fiction pulp magazine. Issued monthly, it was first published in September 1933, and discontinued 18 issues later in February 1935. The magazine was edited by Charles Hornig (25 May 1916 - 11 October 1999).

== Overview ==
Charles D. Hornig of Elizabeth, NJ, at the age of seventeen, founded the magazine, from the beginning seeking to secure the most prestigious weird and science fiction authors he could. Hornig had been buying and reading science fiction regularly since the Sept 1930 issues of Amazing Stories and Wonder Stories. In Jan 1933 he decided to publish a fanzine and contacted Conrad H. Ruppert, who was then producing on letterpress with handset type the fan magazine The Science Fic-Digest. The first issue of Hornig's magazine The Fantasy Fan appeared July 29, 1933. Horning sent a complimentary copy to Hugo Gernsback, publisher of Wonder Stories. Gernsback had just fired his editor David Lasser for spending more time promoting The Workers Alliance and organizing the unemployed than on his editorial work. Gernsback felt a much better job could be done assisting the unemployed if Lasser himself was unemployed and could therefore devote full-time to it. Gernsback was impressed by the professional look and content of Hornig's first issue of The Fantasy Fan; he telegraphed Hornig to come and see him. He had been paying Lasser $75 a week. Due to Hornig's youth, Gernsback hired him at $20 a week and Hornig reported for work Aug 7, 1933. The first issue of Gernsback's Wonder Stories pulp magazine that he produced was Nov 1933, with the help of veteran associate editor C.P. Mason. This gave Hornig the resources to continue The Fantasy Fan which would have been economically difficult otherwise. Hornig stayed with Wonder Stories until 1936.

The Fantasy Fan was considered one of the premier sources of weird and fantasy literature during its short duration, regardless of it being an amateur production. While maintaining a small circulation - its print run probably never exceeded 300 copies, and it had only sixty subscribers - it represented a mixture of news, articles, stories, poems, and miscellany connected to weird fiction. Included within The Fantasy Fan was a column entitled 'The Boiling Point' which devolved to acrimonious letter exchanges between several of the magazine's regular contributors, including H.P. Lovecraft, Forrest J. Ackerman and Clark Ashton Smith; though this column was terminated with the February 1934 issue. Necronomicon Press issued The Boiling Point in book form in the 1980s.

First publication of several works by noteworthy authors occurred in The Fantasy Fan, including works by Lovecraft, Smith, Robert E. Howard, August Derleth, and Robert Bloch. Perhaps one of the magazine's greatest achievements, though, was the serialization of the revised version of Lovecraft's Supernatural Horror in Literature (October 1933-February 1935); the serialization proceeded until it had reached the middle of Chapter VIII and the magazine folded. The Fantasy Fan also saw the first publication of Lovecraft's stories: "The Other Gods" (November 1933) and "From Beyond" (June 1934) as well as reprints (from amateur papers) of "Polaris" (February 1934) and "Beyond the Wall of Sleep" (October 1934); it also published the poems "The Book" (October 1934), "Pursuit" (October 1934), "The Key" (January 1935), and "Homecoming" (January 1935) from Lovecraft's sonnet cycle Fungi from Yuggoth. Lovecraft was represented in no less than seventeen of the eighteen issues published. The October 1934 issue was dedicated to Lovecraft.

The two following issues, November 1934 and December 1934, were tributes to Clark Ashton Smith and Edgar Allan Poe respectively.

The March 1934 issue is remarkable for the first publication of Robert E. Howard's previously rejected (by Weird Tales editor Farnsworth Wright) Conan story, "The Frost King's Daughter". Hornig changed the title to "Gods of the North", and the main character was called "Amra", a Conan nickname which would have been recognized by fans at the time.

The July 1934 and September 1934 issues included a cycle of weird verse octets under the title "Dreams of Yith" by Duane W. Rimel. The cycle was revised by H.P. Lovecraft and perhaps by Clark Ashton Smith.

Hornig experimented with covers for three consecutive issues (September, October, and November 1934), but explained in the December 1934 issue that he was forced to abandon them due to increased printing costs. Issue thirteen (September 1934) would be billed as the First Anniversary Issue.

Distribution of The Fantasy Fan was so small Hornig would sometimes hand write notations on each individual copy, such as upcoming previews (September 1933) or a missed back issue number that was available (December 1934).

In the August 1934 issue, Hornig gratefully acknowledges that the September 1934 issue of Weird Tales contains a plug for The Fantasy Fan by editor Farnsworth Wright, and he expresses hope that such exposure will increase his circulation. Unfortunately the fanzine would still fold six issues later, and today original copies of The Fantasy Fan are considered very rare amongst collectors. Having been printed on thin and cheap paper, it is commonplace for any issue to show signs of deterioration (such as edge browning on pages).

The Fantasy Fan was assisted by the generosity of its contributing authors. who included Robert E. Howard, David H. Keller, J. Harvey Haggard, Eando Binder, and a number of Lovecraft's correspondents including August Derleth, R.H. Barlow, William Lumley, F.Lee Baldwin, Duane Rimel, Emil Petaja and Robert Bloch. Bloch had only one piece in the zine, "The Laughter of a Ghoul", in Issue 16 (Dec 1934).

With the final issue (February 1935), Hornig notes that a favorable arrangement he had with a printer could no longer be maintained, and he had already lost a couple of hundred dollars during the fanzine's run. He also relates that the first issue (September 1933), published just a year-and-a-half earlier, was already commanding prices five to ten times its 0.10 cents cover price.

After the demise of The Fantasy Fan, numerous attempts were made to revive or succeed it. In the spring of 1935 William L. Crawford contemplated reviving the defunct magazine with Lovecraft as editor, but the plan never materialised. No magazine truly filled its place as a news organ, a forum for the expression of fan's views, and a venue for work by distinguished writers in the field.

In 1940, Hornig used the pen names of Derwin Lesser and Homer Porter to author stories for Superworld Comics, which folded after only 3 issues. The publisher again was Hugo Gernsback (Kosmos Publications), who was familiar with Hornig from his prior employment and also of course, The Fantasy Fan.
