= John L. Goldwater =

Publisher; co-founder of Archie Comics

- Born: Max Leonard Goldwasser; February 14, 1916 New York City, U.S.
- Died: February 26, 1999 (aged 83) New York City, U.S.
- Areas: Writer, Editor, Publisher
- Notable works: Archie Andrews; Comics Code Authority; Co-founder of Archie Comics; Co-founder of Belmont Books

John Leonard Goldwater (born Max Leonard Goldwasser, February 14, 1916 – February 26, 1999) co-founded (with Maurice Coyne and Louis Silberkleit) MLJ Comics (later known as Archie Comics), and served as editor and co-publisher for many years. In the mid-1950s he was a key proponent and custodian of the comic book censorship guidelines known as the Comics Code Authority.

== Biography ==
=== Early life and career ===
Goldwater was born in East Harlem, New York on February 14, 1916, to Jewish parents. "His mother died giving birth to him... and his father succumbed to grief, abandoning his baby and dying soon afterward," leaving the orphaned John to be raised by a foster mother, Rose Ettinger. Distantly related to US Senator Barry M. Goldwater, in his youth, the teenage Goldwater hitchhiked his way west during the Depression, leaving "New York, hopping freight trains and bumming rides to the Midwest, where he worked for a time in Hiawatha, Kansas as a news reporter. Assigned to school sports, he hung around with football teams, meeting the players and the girls they attracted, who would later supply him with ample comic material." Goldwater had hitchhiked to the community at the age of 17 and started working at the Hiawatha Daily World. He said that he got fired by publisher Ewing Herbert Sr. after a scrap involving the daughter of the newspaper's biggest advertiser.

A few years later, "he continued west to the Grand Canyon, where he worked at a lodge," from which he was dismissed for "socializing with the female help." His employers paid for him to travel to San Francisco, where he saved enough money (again working as a reporter) to travel by ship back to New York. On the boat, "he met two young women bound for the novitiate... [b]oth fell for him, which later gave him the idea of the Betty-Veronica rivalry."

=== MLJ Comics ===
Arriving back in New York, he gained employment at the docks, where his "experience with shipping" inspired him to both start his own company — Periodicals for Export, Inc. — and strike a deal with pulp/magazine publisher Louis Silberkleit to "buy his outdated issues at a penny each," which he then re-sold abroad. Finding success in his venture, Goldwater was soon joined by Silberkleit and Maurice Coyne to form their own publishing venture MLJ Comics (named after the first initial of each of the three individuals).

Silberkleit and Coyne, with (Timely/Marvel's) Martin Goodman, were among the earliest publishers of pulp magazines with their Columbia Publications publishing house, and others. In addition to having bought stock from them for his Periodicals for Export venture, Goldwater worked alongside the two of them for Paul Sampliner, Jack Liebowitz and Harry Donenfeld's Independent News, the distribution arm of National Periodicals, forerunner of DC Comics.

Inspired by the success of National's Superman and Batman (and hot on the heels of Goodman's Timely Comics publications), Goldwater and company published their first comic — Blue Ribbon Comics #1 — in November 1939, and soon after, in his role as editor, Goldwater helped devise the Shield (created by MLJ writer/editor Harry Shorten) as star of Pep Comics, the Black Hood (also created by Shorten) for Top-Notch Comics, and Steel Sterling in Zip Comics."

=== Archie Comics ===
Interviewed for the book The Best of Archie (1980), Goldwater recalls that he "thought of Superman as an abnormal individual and concluded that the antithesis, a normal person, could be just as popular," so "in 1941, just as the war was restricting paper supplies," the fledgling company began publishing such a character in the pages of Pep Comics #22: Archie Andrews.

According to Goldwater, in 1941, Goldwater, "inspired by the popular 'Andy Hardy' movies starring Mickey Rooney", "dreamed up the carrot-topped, freckle-faced character perpetually torn between two loves, one blond, one dark. He was a hapless teen-age Everyman counterpoised to the hyperpotent Superman, who had made his debut just a few years earlier." Calling the character Archie, the name echoing that of a schoolfriend, Goldwater and series writer/artist Bob Montana surrounded him with a cast supposedly "patterned after teen-agers he [Goldwater] had met in the Midwest."

Other sources give Montana credit for creating the main Archie characters (Archie Andrews, Betty Cooper, Jughead Jones, Veronica Lodge and Reggie Mantle).

=== Success ===
The success of the Archie line of comics, thought Goldwater, was because

"[Archie is] basically a square, but in my opinion the squares are the backbone of America... [and] strong families."

At its peak, the Archie comic strip ran in 750 newspapers, while comics sales continue to sell millions of copies each year (from a height of c. 50 million) through grocery stores and newsvendors as well as tailored comics shops - Archie Comics' output is among the few still carried by the full range of venues.

The Archie line of comics (and related items) gave Goldwater a "multimillion-dollar fortune and publishing empire, Archie Comic Publications Inc. of Mamaroneck, N.Y.," a major rival to the comics industry's Superhero houses Marvel and DC Comics. Archie would feature not just in comic books and newspaper strips, but on radio, television and in film, as well as having his own "short-lived chain of Archie restaurants."

Goldwater ran Archie Comics until his retirement in 1983.

== The Comics Code ==
In 1954, with a public outcry against comics building on Fredric Wertham's book Seduction of the Innocent and the Estes Kefauver-led United States Senate Subcommittee on Juvenile Delinquency hearings, Goldwater helped found the "Comics Magazine Association of America, whose Comics Code Authority persuaded magazines to voluntarily weed out offensive copy as well as ads for guns, knives and war weapons." Goldwater served as president of the Comics Magazine Association for 25 years, personally decrying such events as the 1971 United States Department of Health, Education and Welfare-sanctioned Spider-Man storyline dealing with the problems of drug addiction, which— while talking of the evils of drugs— still violated the code's guidelines by mentioning them at all. As a consequence, Marvel Comics writer and editor Stan Lee decided to defy the CCA and ran the offending story without the seal, to considerable public approval, which discredited the organization.

== Other roles ==
Goldwater also found time to serve as president of the New York Society for the Deaf, and was actively involved as a national commissioner of the Anti-Defamation League of B'nai B'rith, for "more than 50 years." In a 1999 notice placed in The New York Times, he was described as a "Poet Laureate, listed in [The] Who's Who of America," and a member of both the "Old Oaks Country Club and the Friars Club."

== Later life ==
In 1973, Goldwater "licens[ed] Archie for evangelical Christian messages," despite his personal Jewish faith, feeling that the "sentiments were in line with his wholesome family message." The comics were written and illustrated by one of the Archie regulars, Al Hartley, and were published by Spire Christian Comics.

Ten years later, after Goldwater's retirement, the then-publicly traded Archie Comics company was acquired by Richard Goldwater (his son) and Silberkleit's son Michael, returning it to private ownership. In 2009, Goldwater's son, Jonathan, and Michael Silberkleit's widow, Nancy, were named co-CEOs of Archie Comics.

== Death ==
Goldwater died in New York on February 26, 1999, and was survived by his second wife and three sons: Richard (from his first marriage), Jonathan and Jared. He was also described as a "devoted brother of Dorothy Glaser and the late Jack." Donations in his honor to the Anti-Defamation League were invited.

== See also ==
- Archie Comics
- Archie Andrews
