= The Quest of Kadji =

1971 novel by Lin Carter

- Cover art from the First edition
- Author: Lin Carter
- Cover artist: Jeff Jones
- Language: English
- Series: The Chronicles of Kylix
- Genre: Fantasy
- Publisher: Belmont Books
- Publication date: July 1971 (1st edition)
- Publication place: United States
- Media type: print (Paperback)
- Pages: 188
- Preceded by: None
- Followed by: The Wizard of Zao

The Quest of Kadji is a fantasy novel by American writer Lin Carter, the first book of the Chronicles of Kylix series. It was first published in paperback by Belmont Books in July 1971, and was reprinted in December 1972. The first edition in the United Kingdom was published by Five Star Books in 1973. Wildside Press issued a trade paperback edition in December 1999 and an ebook edition in August 2014. The novel has been translated into Dutch, Portuguese and French.

== Plot summary ==
Each volume of the Chronicles of Kylix is set on a different world in the magical solar system of the fictional star Kylix in the constellation of the Unicorn. The system consists of the five planets Zao, Olymbris, Thoorana, Zephrondus and Gulzund. The Quest of Kadji takes place on Gulzund.

Kadji of the Kozanga Horde, young grandson to the aging warrior Zarouk, has been tasked by his grandfather with dethroning Prince Yakthodah, usurper of the throne of the Dragon Emperor. To aide him the chiefs bestow on him the sacred meteor-forged Axe of Thom-Ra. Crossing the Kylix-sun scorched plains on Haral, his faithful black Feridoon pony, Kadji rides into the capital to vanquish his nemesis, knowing full well this will mean his own painful end. He is accompanied on his quest by the magician Akthoob and the red-haired princess Thyra with her wolf companion.

== Reception ==
Robert M. Price calls The Quest of Kadji "a passable Carter effort typical of the period," likening it to such other works of the 1970s as Amalric, The Black Star and the Gondwane Epic. He notes the presence of the hero's usual "entourage" of a "droll magician" and a "warrior-maid" — "[f]riendly magicians and fair maidens, of course, are staples of Carter's fiction." He also identifies it as a surprising precursor to Carter's later pornographic fantasy Tara of the Twilight (1979), with the heroine Thyra serving as the prototype for Tara, that novel's protagonist.
