= The Puzzle Planet =

1961 novel by Robert A. W. Lowndes

- Author: Robert A. W. Lowndes
- Cover artist: Ed Emshwiller
- Language: English
- Genre: science-fiction novel
- Published: 1961 (Ace Books)
- Publication place: United States
- Pages: 119
- OCLC: 4921255

The Puzzle Planet is a science-fiction novel by Robert A. W. Lowndes. It was published in 1961 by Ace Books as one of their double novels (# D-485). According to the author, it marks the first attempt to create a proper science-fiction murder mystery.

== Plot summary ==
Dr. Roy Auckland has been asked by Dr. Howard James to join him on an archaeological expedition to the planet Carolus. As a communications expert, Roy was to deal with the Vaec, a species of humanoid. Roy would also act as a detective, covertly searching for an assassin.

Shortly after coming to Carolus, Roy discovers that someone has poisoned Dr. James' soup. The attempted poisoning was discovered and thwarted by one of the Vaec, who smelled the poison. Further on, a time bomb clearly meant for Dr. James explodes early harmlessly. They discover is trying to murder Dr. James and is being downright amateurish about it. Roy wants to prevent that someone from succeeding. As in any good murder mystery, Roy has the intended victim and a list of suspects:

- Dr. Howard James; leader of the expedition, he has spent his career trying to remove the stigma of having been the assistant of an archaeologists who perpetrated a fraud reminiscent of the Piltdown Man hoax of the early twentieth century.
- Amanda James; Dr. James' philandering wife
- Dr. Kenneth Glamis; a cynic who questions the validity of almost everything anyone, especially Dr. James, says. He seems especially testy because he must wear an all-covering suit to protect him from the ultraviolet radiation coming through Carolus' atmosphere.
- Calvin Burleigh; a religious fanatic, who believes that Terrans should not contact alien peoples and corrupt those peoples with their degenerate ways. He opposed Dr. James' expedition before joining it.
- Captain Walter Edholm; in charge of the labor force, recruited from the Vaec. He doesn't seem to have any animosity toward anybody, but he doesn't trust the Vaec and wants to leave Carolus.
- Shirley Mason; the expedition's secretary-typist. She gave up a promising career in space services to come to Carolus and Roy can't understand why. He discovers the reason as he investigates the first actual murder.

Not long after Roy has his list made up and has asked four of the Vaec to watch the building in which the Terrans reside, one person on the list is murdered. It was made to look like an accident, as if the victim had been stung by one of the local insects, but Roy discovers that the murder was executed by a very clever trap that apparently had been set for Dr. James. After interrogating the Vaec observers Roy feels that he has all of the clues necessary to solve the murder, but he can't yet see the pattern.

Later Roy goes to the Vaec village, where the aliens subject him to several tests that reveal to him a procedural error that he's been making in his investigation. He also discovers that the Vaec are teledynes, that they possess the power of telepathy and the ability to teleport objects. As Roy returns to the Terran base the murderer attempts to kill him, but the Vaec thwart the attempt.

At last Roy solves the mystery and, in good murder mystery fashion, he gathers all of the participants together to reveal the killer. At the same time the Vaec reveal that they are long-lived members of a highly advanced civilization and that they are cutting off all contact with Terrans until the Terrans properly fulfill their potential.

== Development history ==
In the Foreword Lowndes writes,

Back in the early 40s, I remember a bull-session that some of us had with John W. Campbell, where he stated definitively that there could never be any such thing as a science-fiction detective story in the traditional “murder mystery” sense. His reason for this proclamation was that since almost anything can happen in a science-fiction story – the villain can pull any sort of dingus or super-phenomenon out of his hat – the reader would never have a fair chance to solve the mystery. I didn’t quite believe it, yet I couldn’t think of any counter-argument to throw at John at the time. But, as Holmes would have said, it was all so absurdly simple! Of course there can be science-fiction murder mysteries, offering the reader as good a chance to solve the crime as he has in any ordinary murder-mystery where the author is playing fair. And you can have science-fiction wonders and dinguses and super-scientific phenomenon, too: you just make it clear that nothing essential to the solution of the crime is wrapped up in super-science, or intricate phenomenon and extrapolation that only a scientific wizard could be expected to unravel. The motives, methods, and clues must all lie within the range of what is clearly presented to the reader. I hope Puzzle Planet will convince you that the murder mystery does have a place in science fiction.

== Publication history ==
- 1961, US, Ace Books (Ace Double #485), paperback (119 pp).
- 1962, Germany, Erich Pabel Verlag (Rastatt), Utopia Zukunftsromane #357, as Das Rätsel Carolus (The Carolus Riddle).
- 2011, US, Armchair Fiction, ISBN 978-1-61287-005-2, Jan 2011, paperback (216 pp).

== Reviews ==
The book was reviewed by

- P. Schuyler Miller at Analog Science Fact - Fiction (July 1961).
