= Belmont Books =

American publisher

- Founded: 1960
- Founders: John L. Goldwater, Louis Silberkleit, Maurice Coyne
- Defunct: 1971 (merged with Tower Publications)
- Successor: Belmont Tower
- Country of origin: United States
- Headquarters location: 66 Leonard Street, New York City
- Key people: Ivan Howard
- Publication types: Paperbacks
- Fiction genres: Science fiction, horror, fantasy, sword and sorcery

Belmont Books, also known as Belmont Productions, was an American publisher of genre fiction paperback originals founded in 1960. It specialized in science fiction, horror and fantasy, with titles appearing from 1961 through 1971. The company published books by such notable authors as Philip K. Dick, Philip José Farmer, Lin Carter, Robert Bloch, Frank Belknap Long, and Gardner Fox. Belmont was owned by the same company that owned Archie Comics.

== History ==
Belmont was formed by John L. Goldwater, Louis Silberkleit, Maurice Coyne, the co-founders of Archie Comics, who also ran the pulp magazine publisher Columbia Publications. When Columbia was shut down in 1960 (due to the demise of the pulp industry), Goldwater, Silberkleit, and Coyne immediately formed Belmont Books. According to the son of one of the founders, the name of the company came from Belmont Park, as the owners were fans of horse racing.

Belmont's initial offerings were four titles — a Western, a mystery, a science fiction book, and a detective book. Once they got going, Belmont published about 12 titles per month, with print runs of between 30,000 and 70,000 copies. Rather than bookstores, their books were sold in railroad stations, airports, bus terminals, drug stores, and the lobbies of office buildings and hotels.

From 1962 to 1965, Belmont published a number of science fiction anthologies, all edited by Ivan Howard, that featured content from the pulp magazines Science Fiction, Future Fiction, Science Fiction Quarterly, and Dynamic Science Fiction, all of which had been published by Belmont co-owner Louis Silberkleit.

Beginning in 1963, Belmont published nine updated The Shadow novels. The first one, Return of The Shadow, was by Walter B. Gibson. The remaining eight, published from 1964 to 1967, were written by Dennis Lynds under the pen name "Maxwell Grant."

From 1969 to 1970, Belmont published a series of sword and sorcery novels by Gardner Fox, featuring the barbarian character Kothar.

The firm merged with Tower Publications (the parent company of Tower Comics) in 1971, forming Belmont Tower, under which name it continued publishing from 1971 through 1980.

== Titles published (selected) ==
Cover illustration for The Quest of Kadji (Belmont, 1971).

- Michael Avallone:
  - Shock Corridor (1963) — novelization of the screenplay of Samuel Fuller's film
  - Tales of the Frightened, edited by Boris Karloff (1963) — though based on the recordings by Karloff of the same title, and featuring his image on the book cover, contained stories written by Avallone
- Robert Bloch:
  - House of the Hatchet (1960)
  - More Nightmares (1961) — Belmont #L92-530
  - Terror (1962) — Belmont L92-537 (Working title: Amok)
  - Yours Truly, Jack the Ripper (1962) — Belmont #L92-527
  - Horror 7 (1963) — Belmont #90–275
  - The Living Demons (Sept. 1967) — Belmont #B50-787
  - Ladies Day / This Crowded Earth (1968) — "A Belmont Double"; Belmont B60-080 OCLC 1649428
- Lin Carter:
  - Beyond the Gates of Dream, by Carter and collaborators (Aug. 1969) — collection of short stories
  - Giant of World's End (Feb. 1969)
  - The Quest of Kadji (July 1971) — the first book of the Chronicles of Kylix series
  - The Purloined Planet (May 1969)
  - The Thief of Thoth (Jan. 1968) - "A Belmont Double"; Belmont/Tower 50244
- Groff Conklin (as editor): Twisted (May 1962) — anthology of horror short stories; reprinted in 1967
- Philip K. Dick: The Penultimate Truth (1964)
- John M. Faucette: The Warriors of Terra (1970)
- Philip José Farmer: The Gate of Time (1966)
- Harlan Ellison:
  - Doomsman (July 1972) - "A Belmont Double"; Belmont/Tower 50244
- Gardner Fox:
  - Kothar series:
    - Kothar: Barbarian Swordsman (1969)
    - Kothar of the Magic Sword (Jan. 1969)
    - Kothar and the Demon Queen (1969)
    - Kothar and the Conjurer's Curse (1970)
    - Kothar and the Wizard Slayer (1970)
  - The Lady from L.U.S.T. series (Fox writing as "Rod Gray"):
    - The Copulation Explosion (1970)
    - Easy Ride (1971)
    - The Lady Takes It All Off (1971)
- Ivan Howard (as editor):
  - Escape to Earth (1962) — includes three stories from Future Fiction
  - The Weird Ones (1962) — includes three stories from Future Fiction
  - 6 and the Silent Scream (1963) — includes three stories from Science Fiction
  - Novelets of Science Fiction (1963) — anthology containing L. Sprague de Camp's short story "The Galton Whistle" as well as four stories from Dynamic Science Fiction and four from Future Fiction
  - Rare Science Fiction (1963) — includes three stories from Science Fiction Quarterly and four stories from Science Fiction
  - Way Out (1963) — six of the seven stories are from Dynamic Science Fiction, mostly from the first issue
  - Masters of Science Fiction (1964) — includes four stories from Science Fiction
  - Things (1964) — includes three stories from Future Fiction
  - Now and Beyond (1965) — includes four stories from Science Fiction and four from Future Fiction
- Laurence Janifer: The Final Fear (1967)
- Damon Knight: The Metal Smile (1968)
- Lloyd Kropp: The Drift (1971) — reprint of 1969 original (published by Doubleday)
- Frank Belknap Long:
  - The Horror Expert (Dec. 1961)
  - The Hounds of Tindalos (Aug. 1963) — story collection; reprint of title originally published by Arkham House, 1946
  - It Was the Day of the Robot (1963)
  - This Strange Tomorrow (Feb. 1966)
  - Journey Into Darkness (April 1967)
  - ...And Others Shall Be Born (Jan. 1968) — bound with The Thief of Thoth by Lin Carter
  - Lest Earth Be Conquered (Dec. 1966) — reissued as The Androids (Tower Books, 1969)
- Robert Payne (writing as "Richard Cargoe"): The Back of the Tiger (1961)
- Don Rico: Lorelei (1966)
- Joseph Ross (as editor): The Best of Amazing (1969)
- David Saunders: M Squad: The Chicago Cop Killer (1962)
- The Shadow:
  - Return of The Shadow, by Walter B. Gibson (1963)
  - The Shadow Strikes, by Dennis Lynds writing as Maxwell Grant (1964)
  - Beware Shadow, by Dennis Lynds writing as Maxwell Grant (1965)
  - Cry Shadow, by Dennis Lynds writing as Maxwell Grant (1965)
  - The Shadow's Revenge, by Dennis Lynds writing as Maxwell Grant (1965)
  - Mark of The Shadow, by Dennis Lynds writing as Maxwell Grant (1966)
  - Shadow Go Mad, by Dennis Lynds writing as Maxwell Grant (1966)
  - Night of The Shadow, by Dennis Lynds writing as Maxwell Grant (Nov. 1966)
  - The Shadow, Destination: Moon, by Dennis Lynds writing as Maxwell Grant (1967)
- Harry Shorten: There Oughta Be a Law (1969, 1971)
- Warren Smith Finder's Keepers (1965)
- Denys Val Baker: Bizarre Loves (1964)
- Charles Willeford: The Machine in Ward Eleven (1963) — short story collection. Willeford stated, "I had a hunch that madness was a predominant theme and a normal condition for Americans living in the second half of this century. The publication of [the book] and its reception by readers confirmed what I had only heretofore suspected."
