= Beyond the Gates of Dream =

1969 collection of short stories by Lin Carter

- Cover of the first edition
- Author: Lin Carter
- Cover artist: Jeff Jones
- Language: English
- Genre: Fantasy short stories
- Publisher: Belmont Books
- Publication date: 1969
- Publication place: United States
- Media type: Print (paperback)
- Pages: 157

Beyond the Gates of Dream is a collection of short stories by science fiction and fantasy author Lin Carter. It was first published in paperback by Belmont Books in August 1969 and reprinted by Belmont Tower in November 1972, with later editions from Leisure Books in April 1982 and Wildside Press in December 1999. The first British edition was issued in paperback by Five Star in 1973; a later British edition was issued as an ebook by Gateway/Orion in March 2020. The book has been translated into Dutch.

== Summary ==
The book collects seven stories by Carter, two of them collaborative and four of them original to the collection, together with an introduction and afterward. One oddity in regard to the book's first edition is that its back cover blurb references and summarizes three stories of Carter's presumably intended for the collection but which do not actually appear in it, including a time travel story and two other stories identifiable as "The Martian El Dorado of Parker Wintley," (later published in The DAW Science Fiction Reader (1976)) and "The Gods of Neol-Shendis," (published in Amra (July 1966), later revised as "The Gods Of Niom Parma" (published in Warlocks and Warriors (1970)).

== Contents ==
- "A Sort of Introduction, Called Here, and Back Again"
- "Masters of the Metropolis" (with Randall Garrett) (from The Magazine of Fantasy & Science Fiction, April 1957)
- "Owlstone"
- "Keru"
- "The Hand of Nergal" (with Robert E. Howard) (from Conan, 1967)
- "Harvey Hodges, Veebelfetzer"
- "Uncollected Works" (from The Magazine of Fantasy & Science Fiction, March 1965)
- "The Mantichore" (from Khymyrium, a work-in-progress)
- "A Few Last Words" (afterword)

== Awards ==
"Uncollected Works" was nominated for the 1966 Nebula Award for Best Short Story.
