= Robert A. W. Lowndes =

American novelist

Robert Lowndes
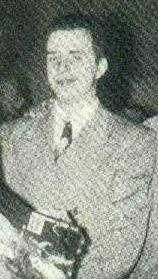
- Robert A. W. Lowndes in 1953
- Born: September 4, 1916
- Died: July 14, 1998 (aged 81)
- Occupations: Editor, writer
- Writing career
- Genre: Science fiction
- Notable works: editor of Future Science Fiction, Science Fiction, and Science Fiction Quarterly
- Notable awards: First Fandom Hall of Fame Award, 1991

Robert Augustine Ward "Doc" Lowndes (September 4, 1916 – July 14, 1998) was an American science fiction author, editor and fan. He was known best as the editor of Future Science Fiction, Science Fiction, and Science Fiction Quarterly, among many other crime-fiction, western, sports-fiction, and other pulp and digest sized magazines for Columbia Publications. Among the most famous writers he was first to publish at Columbia was mystery writer Edward D. Hoch, who in turn would contribute to Lowndes's fiction magazines as long as he was editing them. Lowndes was a principal member of the Futurians. His first story, "The Outpost at Altark" for Super Science in 1940, was written in collaboration with fellow Futurian Donald A. Wollheim, uncredited.

== Lovecraftian work ==
Lowndes was also a horror enthusiast—as a young fan, he received two letters of encouragement from H. P. Lovecraft in 1937. The two Lovecraft letters are reprinted in Crypt of Cthulhu Volume 8, No 3 (Whole number 62)(Candlemas 1989), a special issue devoted to Lowndes. He wrote a number of dark fantasy stories such as "The Abyss" (1941) (reprinted in "Revelations from Yuggoth" No 2 (May 1988) and "The Leapers" (1942), inspired by Lovecraft. The Crypt of Cthulhu tribute issue also reprints Lowndes' Lovecraftian stories "Leapers" (a shorter version, first published as by 'Carol Grey' appeared in the Dec 1942 issue of Future Fantasy and Science Fiction; a revised version appeared in the Magazine of Horror; and the Crypt of Cthulhu version represents a third and final revision, with a new intro by Lowndes explaining its publication history) and "Settler's Wall" (a shorter version of the latter as "The Long Wall" by 'Wilfred Owen Morley' was published in the March 1942 issue of Stirring Science Stories and was twice revised for later publication). The Lowndes tribute issue also includes two Lovecraftian poems, "The Burrowers Beneath" and "Forbidden Books" (which also appeared under the 'Wilfred Owen Morley' pseudonym in Stirring Science Stories for April and July 1941 respectively); along with two critical articles by Lowndes which first appeared in Magazine of Horror, and an essay on Lowndes - "Lowndes, Lovecraft and the Health Knowledge Years" by Mike Ashley.

Lowndes also wrote a series of poems inspired by Lovecraft's Fungi from Yuggoth - "The Annals of Arkya", which he followed up with "The New Annals of Arkya." According to Donald A. Wollheim's introduction to the anthology Operation Phantasy: The Best from The Phantagraph (Rego Park, NY: The Phantagraph Press, p. 13), The Annals of Arkya was first issued as a standalone booklet by Wollheim's The Phantagraph Press. The 12-sonnet sequence "Annals of Arkya" was reprinted in Crypt of Cthulhu 10, No 3 (Whole number 78) (St John's Eve, 1991). These have also been reprinted in an issue of Shawn Ramsey's "Revelations from Yuggoth". His nonfiction "A Tribute to H. P. Lovecraft" appears in Peter Cannon, ed. Lovecraft Remembered (Arkham House, 1988).

== The Health Knowledge magazines ==
In 1963, Lowndes initiated the Magazine of Horror (1963–1971) for Health Knowledge Inc., which mixed reprints with new stories. The magazine was popular and spawned several companion magazines: Startling Mystery Stories, Famous Science Fiction (both 1966) Weird Terror Tales (1969) and Bizarre Fantasy Fiction (1970). Lowndes also edited two non-fantastic-fiction magazines for the company, Thrilling Western Magazine (1967) and World Wide Adventure (1967), along with the speculative nonfiction titles they published. However, the collapse of Health Knowledge in 1971 ended these magazines. Startling Mystery Stories was notable for carrying the first stories of Stephen King and F. Paul Wilson. Lowndes subsequently went on to work on the Gernsback Publications' non-fiction magazine, Sexology.

In 1991 he received the First Fandom Hall of Fame award.

== Works ==
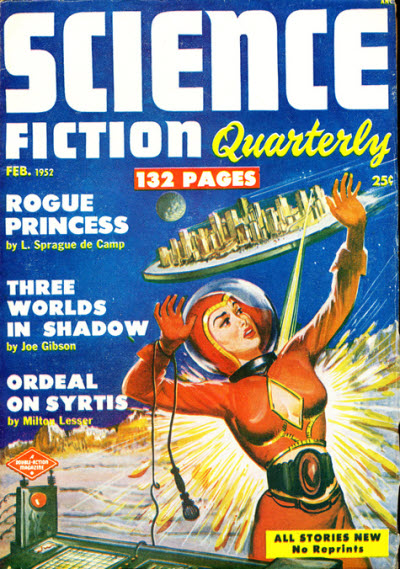
Lowndes's "Intervention" (written under his Michael Sherman byline) was the cover story on the February 1952 issue of Science Fiction Quarterly

=== Novels ===
- Mystery of the Third Mine, Philadelphia, Winston, 1953, 201p. (Juvenile).
- The Duplicated Man (with James Blish), New York, Avalon, 1959 (first magazine publication 1953).
- Believer's World, Avalon Books, 1961 (serialized in 1952), 224p.(expanded from the 1952 appearance in Space magazine as "A Matter of Faith" as by Michael Sherman).
- The Puzzle Planet, Ace Books, Ace Double D-485, 1961

=== Short stories ===
- The Abyss and other Dark Places, UK, Logos Press, 1998 (Chapbook). Edited by Stephen Sennitt.

=== Non-fiction ===
- Three Faces of Science Fiction: SF as Instruction, Propaganda, and Delight, Boston, NESFA Press, 1973, 96p. Collects Lowndes' literary columns from Famous Science Fiction.
- Orchids for Doc: The Literary Adventures and Autobiography of Robert A.W. "Doc" Lowndes (with Jeffrey M. Elliot), Borgo Press, Borgo Bioviews No 7, ISBN 0-89370-344-3, Note: According to the Internet Science Fiction Database, this volume was never published.
- The Gernsback Days: A Study of the Evolution of Modern Science Fiction from 1911 to 1936 (with Mike Ashley), Wildside Press, 2004, ISBN 0-8095-1054-5 hardcover, ISBN 0-8095-1055-3 paperback, 500p.
- "Introduction" in Dracula; New York: Airmont Publishing Company, Inc., 1965.
- "Introduction" for The Time Chariot, Avalon Books, 1966.

=== Editor ===
- Blish, James and Robert Lowndes. The Best of James Blish. New York: Ballantine Books, 1979. ISBN 0-345-25600-X
