= Louis Silberkleit =

Publisher; co-founder of Archie Comics

- Born: 17 November 1900; New York City, U.S.
- Died: February 21, 1986 (aged 85); New York City, U.S.
- Education: Morris High School (Bronx) (1919); New York Law School (1934)
- Occupation: Publisher
- Known for: Co-founder of Columbia Publications; Co-founder and Publisher of Archie Comics; Co-founder of Belmont Books
- Successor: Michael I. Silberkleit
- Spouse(s): Lillian Meisel (1926–1970); Nicole Bernheim (1972–1986)
- Children: 1

Louis Horace Silberkleit (/ˈsɪlbərklaɪt/; 17 November 1900 – 21 February 1986) was an American publisher of magazines, books, and comic books; together with Maurice Coyne and John L. Goldwater, he co-founded MLJ Magazines (later known as Archie Comics), and served as its publisher for many years.

== Biography ==
Silberkleit attended Morris High School in the Bronx, graduating in 1919. His first job was in 1923 as circulation promoter for the New York Evening Mail. In 1925 he moved over to Eastern Distributing Corporation, which distributed many of the early pulp magazines published by Hugo Gernsback. Silberkleit started out as Eastern's circulation manager of periodicals, and by 1929 had been promoted to circulation manager of the entire company. That year Silberkleit hired a young Martin Goodman to be his assistant, beginning a long professional relationship. Eastern Distributing went bankrupt in 1932.

According to his son Michael, Silberkleit began his career in publishing when he founded Columbia Publications, a publisher of magazines featuring science fiction, westerns and detective stories by writers such as Isaac Asimov and Louis L'Amour. According to other sources, in October 1932 Silberkleit and Goodman formed the two companies Mutual Magazine Distributors and Newsstand Publishers; their first publication was the pulp magazine Complete Western Book Magazine, cover-dated October 1933. (Mutual Magazine went bankrupt in 1935.)

Silberkleit graduated from New York Law School in 1934. That same year, Silberkleit formed Winford Publications with John L. Goldwater; Winford's business manager was Maurice Coyne. Winford published such titles as Double Action Western, Real Western, Mystery Novels, Underworld Detective, and Complete Northwest Novel Magazine. Editor Abner Sundell came on board in 1935; he later played an important role at MLJ Magazines. In short order, Silberkleit and partners (including Harold Hammond) formed a number of other pulp publishers: Chesterfield Publications, Northwest Publishing, Blue Ribbon Magazines, Columbia Publications, and Double Action Magazines. The headquarters of all these companies were in the vicinity of Manhattan's City Hall; by May 1937 they were consolidated under the name Double-Action Magazines, located at 60 Hudson Street. By 1941, Silberkleit had phased out all the other publisher names and merged all the titles under the umbrella of Columbia Publications (and hired Robert A. W. Lowndes as his lead editor).

In 1939, in response to the popularity of Superman and Action Comics, Silberkleit, Goldwater, and Coyne founded the comic book publisher MLJ Magazines. The name was derived from the initials of the first names of Maurice Coyne, Louis Silberkleit, and John Goldwater. After starting out as a publisher of superhero comics, MLJ Magazines produced the first Archie Comics in the winter of 1942, described by The New York Times as "a series of comic books detailing the antics of Archie and his teen-age friends." Archie soon became MLJ Magazine's headliner, which led to the company changing its name to Archie Comic Publications.

Columbia Publications lasted until 1960, at which point Silberkleit, Goldwater, and Coyne immediately founded Belmont Books, a low-rent publisher of paperback originals in the science fiction, horror, and mystery genres. Beginning c. 1958, Silberkleit was also a silent partner in Tower Publications, publisher of the Midwood Books line of soft-core erotic fiction for men, and later, Tower Books and Tower Comics. In 1971, Tower acquired the assets of Belmont Books, merging the two companies to form Belmont Tower.

== Personal life ==
On May 16, 1926 Louis Silberkleit married Lillian Meisel (20 April 1903 – 23 April 1970), a Lithuanian of Jewish ancestry who came to America in 1914. On April 27, 1932 their only son, Michael Ivan Silberkleit, was born in New York City.

On April 23, 1970 Lillian Silberkleit died in New York City at the age of sixty-seven.

In 1972 he married his second wife, Nicole Bernheim.

== Death and legacy ==
Louis H. Silberkleit died on Friday, February 21, 1986 at Mount Sinai Hospital. He was survived by his second wife Nicole Bernheim and his son Michael I. Silberkleit (from his first marriage) and daughter Ally Silberkleit.

Michael Silberkleit became chairman of Archie Comics after his father's death. Michael died on August 5, 2008; his widow Nancy became co-CEO of the company with Jonathan Goldwater (John L. Goldwater's son).
