= Charles Hornig =

American novelist

Charles Hornig (May 25, 1916 – October 11, 1999) was one of the earliest contributors to the science fiction genre. He not only created one of the first fanzines in 1933, as a teenager, he became the managing editor for Wonder Stories magazine from November, 1933 to April, 1936.

== Early life ==
Charles D. Hornig was the third child born to Gertrude Lesser and Charles Edward Hornig. He had two sisters, Gladys and Dorothy, 7 and 5 years older than him. Charles was born at home in Jersey City on May 25, 1916, and was named Charles Derwin Hornig, after his father and a woman, Mrs. Derwin, who had been a friend and helper to Gertrude.

In an interview with Dr. Jeffrey M. Elliot, Hornig tells the story of his sickly childhood. He also talks about moving around a lot when they were unable to pay the rent. He mentions as well the way his eldest sister mistreated him. He goes on to tell the story of how he was able to buy himself “goodies” with pennies earned by selling magazines and newspapers door to door and on street corners. He thought the most wonderful thing that happened to him was the discovery of Science Fiction when he was 14 years old in 1930. It was the “glaring” cover of an Amazing Stories that got him hooked. On the September 1930 cover was a picture of a New York skyscraper being torn from its roots in a sea of flames. Every quarter he could earn doing odd jobs was spent buying as many issues of Amazing Stories, Wonder Stories, Astounding Stories and Weird Tales as he could afford.

== The Fantasy Fan ==
There were a few other young fans of Science Fiction who made contact with each other via the professional magazines that published the names and addresses of those that wrote to the magazines such as The Time Traveller and Fantasy Magazine. Some of these fans such as Julius Schwartz, Mort Weisinger, Connie Rupert, and Milton Kaletsky became friends with Charles. Charles had the idea that he would like to publish his own science fiction fan magazine and was encouraged by these friends. He was pleasantly surprised when H. P. Lovecraft, Clark Ashton Smith, August Derleth and other writers agreed to send him some manuscripts that had been rejected by the paying magazines. So he convinced Connie Rupert to hand set and print 250 copies, 12 pages each of the first issue of The Fantasy Fan. This was when he was 17 years old. He published The Fantasy Fan in 1933–1935. He sent these to many science fiction fans including editors and publishers of magazines, one of whom was Hugo Gernsback who offered him a job as managing editor of Wonder Stories.

== Wonder Stories Magazine ==
Only a fan for 3 years, not having yet graduated from high school, he became an editor of a magazine read all over the world. He met many other people in the science fiction world. He managed to complete 18 issues of his little Fantasy Fan, where he was even able to publish some ultimately classic stories. When Gernsbach sold Wonder Stories to Standard Magazines Charles lost his post 2 ½ years after he started, but he continued his work with science fiction editing by working freelance for Science-Fiction and Future Fiction while he pursued the job he had been learning in high school and that was accounting. Charles remembered fondly his youth and the people he befriended such as Ray Bradbury and Forrest J Ackerman. Asimov writes “Charles D. Hornig is the only science fiction notable who has absolutely no talent”. Charles pointed this out in his interview with Charles Ryan with pride: “Issac Asimov in one of his books said something like Charles D. Hornig had a complete lack of talent.”

== Post Science-Fiction Life ==
Charles' life changed dramatically when he was asked to register for the military. Philosophically he knew he could never hurt another human being or aid anybody in doing this. When he heard there was the category of conscientious objector, he was relieved and registered as such stating that his religion was Moral Theism. In those days COs were sent to Civilian Public Service Camps; he was sent to one in Oregon which was a refurbished CCC forest camp, and he found himself doing hard physical labor, but shortly after his arrival was assigned to office work. After about a year his conscience was troubled as he felt he was in a kind of prison, so he went AWOL.

This eventually led to his meeting his future wife, Florence Koch, in New York City at a Fellowship of Reconciliation luncheon. While he was in prison at McNeil Island in Washington State, having been sentenced for going AWOL, his first child, Ruth Cecelia, was born in June 1944. Following his release from prison, he and his family moved to Los Angeles, where his son, Charles Evan, was born in early January 1946. After spending a few years moving around southern California and taking various jobs, he and Florence decided they wanted to work again for the Fellowship of Reconciliation in NYC, so moved back there in 1949, first living in NYC and then in Bogota, New Jersey. In 1952, Charles realized that he needed to live in warm California again so they headed back there, finding a little house in San Jose, California, where he set up his own business preparing income tax, which he did successfully until 1998. By 1962, he was living on his own as Florence had moved to Seattle and his children had left home as well.

== Later years ==
During his years in accounting he continued the love he held in the 1940s for Esperanto, went on numerous peace marches, and joined up with the Humanist and Quaker communities.

He loved to travel and visited many countries until 1981, when he needed to curtail his solo traveling as it became too difficult due to his health concerns. In the 1980s he did a little traveling with his daughter, taking her on cruises. In 1991 it became too painful for him to continue taking long walks due to arthritis in his spine. In 1993 he had a small stroke which briefly impaired his short-term memory.

He had kept up with his Science-Fiction friends, was awarded a First Fandom Hall of Fame award in 1988 for his contributions to the field of Science-Fiction, and Ray Bradbury sent his condolences at his death. His death on October 11, 1999, was due to the side effects of medication he had been taking for his heart condition. He had had a small heart attack in 1982 and a triple bypass operation in 1990.
