= Flashing Swords! =

Book series by Dell Books

Cover of Flashing Swords! #1, 1973

Flashing Swords! is a series of fantasy anthologies published by Dell Books from 1973 to 1981 under the editorship of Lin Carter, and revived under the editorship of Robert M. Price in 2020. It originally showcased the heroic fantasy work of the members of the Swordsmen and Sorcerers' Guild of America (SAGA), a somewhat informal literary group active from the 1960s to the 1980s, of which Carter was a guiding force. The revived series featured pieces by newer, lesser-known authors, along with older material by Carter.

== Summary ==
The Flashing Swords! series originally provided a cross-section of the heroic fantasy of the 1970s-early 1980s. The initial two volumes included stories by the eight founding members of SAGA, with the third and fourth also including pieces by newer members as membership was extended to other fantasy authors; the fifth volume was devoted entirely to the works of authors who were not (or not yet) members. Carter and SAGA also sponsored The Gandalf Award from 1974-1981. With the collapse of Carter’s health in the 1980s the anthology series, the Gandalf award, and SAGA itself all went into abeyance.

In the 2020s a revival of the series edited by Carter's literary executor Robert M. Price was projected, to feature contemporary fantasy writers; some older pieces by Carter were also included. The first volume, Lin Carter's Flashing Swords! #6 was issued (briefly) by Pulp Hero Press in July, 2020. Due to an introduction found objectionable by some of the authors whose works were included, the publisher delisted the book a few days after publication. A second edition of the volume, retaining just three of its twelve stories and adding seven more, was eventually issued by Timaios Press in January, 2021. Subsequent volumes of the revived series were issued by different publishers.

== Contents ==
In all, twenty-three stories by fifteen authors were published in the original five-volume series, all of them for the first time. These included two "Fafhrd and the Gray Mouser" stories by Fritz Leiber (in #1 and #3), two "Dying Earth" stories by Jack Vance (in #1 and #4), the first two parts of the novel The Merman's Children by Poul Anderson (also in #1 and #4), two "Amalric the Mangod" stories by Lin Carter (in #1 and #3), a "Pusad" tale and the first part of the novel The Incorporated Knight by L. Sprague de Camp (in #2 and #3, respectively), two "Elric of Melniboné" stories by Michael Moorcock (in #2 and #4), two "Witch World" stories by Andre Norton (in #2 and #3), two "Brak the Barbarian" stories by John Jakes (in #2 and #4), one story by Avram Davidson (in #3), a "Deryni" story by Katherine Kurtz (in #4), a "Dilvish" story by Roger Zelazny (in #5), a story by C. J. Cherryh (in #5), a story by Diane Duane (in #5), an "Ebenezum" story by Craig Shaw Gardner (in #5), and a story by Tanith Lee (in #5).

In Price's volumes 6-8 (including both versions of v. 6) forty-one stories by twenty-one authors were published, including three by Glynn Owen Barrass, one by Cliff Biggers, three by Lin Carter, one by Adrian Cole, three by Pierre V. Comtois, one by Jason Ross Cummings, one by Santiago del Dardano Turann, two by Steve Dilks, one by Charles Garofalo, three by Clayton L. Hinkle, one by Mike Jansen, four by Wayne Judge, one by Steve Lines, one by Paul F. McNamee, seven by Robert M. Price, one by D. M. Ritzlin, one by Charles R. Rutledge, one by Frank Schildiner, one by Richard Toogood, one by Michael A. Turton, and five by Glen M. Usher. The pieces by Hinkle are graphic novellas.

== Books ==
- Flashing Swords! #1 (1973)
- Flashing Swords! #2 (1973)
- Flashing Swords! #3: Warriors and Wizards (1976)
- Flashing Swords! #4: Barbarians and Black Magicians (1977)
- Flashing Swords! #5: Demons and Daggers (1981)
- Lin Carter's Flashing Swords! #6 (original version) (2020)
- Lin Carter's Flashing Swords! #6 (revised version) (2021)
- Lin Carter's Flashing Swords! #7 (2023)
- Lin Carter's Flashing Swords! #8 (2023)

== Relation to other works ==
A precursor of the series was Swords Against Tomorrow, edited by Robert Hoskins (Signet Books, 1970), an anthology which included pieces by four of the eight SAGA members of that time.

Before producing the two versions of Flashing Swords! #6 Robert M. Price edited a similar Sword and Sorcery anthology, The Mighty Warriors (Ulthar Press, 2018), showcasing some of the same authors whose works appeared in his Flashing Swords! volumes.

Of the stories slated for the original version of Flashing Swords! #6 that were not carried over into the revised version, D. M. Ritzlin's "A Twisted Branch of Yggdrasil" was subsequently published in his collection Necromancy in Nilztiria (DMR Books, 2020), while Adrian Cole's "The Tower in the Crimson Mist" and Steve Dilks's "Tale of the Uncrowned Kings" were subsequently published in the anthology Savage Scrolls, Volume One (Pulp Hero Press, 2020).
