= The Mighty Warriors =

The Mighty Warrors
- Cover of The Mighty Warriors
- Author: edited by Robert M. Price
- Cover artist: Bruce Timm
- Language: English
- Genre: Fantasy
- Publisher: Ulthar Press
- Publication date: 2018
- Publication place: United States
- Media type: Print (paperback) and ebook
- Pages: 239 pp.
- ISBN: 978-1-71899-913-8
- Preceded by: The Mighty Swordsmen

The Mighty Warriors is an anthology of fantasy short stories in the sword and sorcery subgenre, edited by Robert M. Price. It was first published in trade paperback and ebook by Ulthar Press in May 2018, and was a homage to the similar early sword and sorcery anthologies The Mighty Barbarians (1969) and The Mighty Swordsmen (1970) edited by Hans Stefan Santesson.

== Summary ==
The book collects eleven sword and sorcery tales of protagonists and settings prominent in the genre, featuring Henry Kuttner's Elak of Atlantis, Clark Ashton Smith's Zothique, Lin Carter's Thongor, David C. Smith's Oron, Charles R. Saunders's Imaro, Richard L. Tierney's Simon of Gitta (based on the legendary Simon Magus), Milton J. Davis' Changa, Charles R. Rutledge's Karrn, and Ken Asamatu's Ikkyū, among others. Some are by the authors associated with the original works and others are pastisches written by later writers.

== Contents ==
- "Know, O Prince: An Introduction" (Robert M. Price)
- "Spawn of the Sea God" (Elak of Atlantis) (Adrian Cole)
- "The Corpse's Crusade" (Zothique) (Cody Goodfellow)
- "Thongor in the Valley of Demons" (Thongor) (Robert M. Price)
- "The Shadow of Dia-Sust" (Oron) (David C. Smith)
- "Amudu's Bargain" (Imaro) (Charles R. Saunders)
- "The Secret of Nephren-Ka" (Simon of Gitta) (Robert M. Price)
- "The Temple of Light" (Changa) (Milton J. Davis)
- "Kiss of the Succubus" (Karrn) (Charles R. Rutledge)
- "The Living Wind" (Ikkyū) (Ken Asamatsu)
- "The Last Temple of Balsoth" (Gondar) (Cliff Biggers)
- "Lono and the Pit of Punhaki " (Lono) (Paul R. McNamee)
- "Appendix One: Karrn's Published adventures"
- "Appendix Two: An Adrian Cole Bibliography"
- "Appendix Three: Karrn the Barbarian" (Charles R. Rutledge)

== Reception ==
Morgan Holmes, reviewing to book at castaliahouse.com, notes its mixture of revived and new characters and concludes "[i]f you like sword and sorcery and want to support the genre, buy this book. After reading the contents, it makes the case that homage is greater than pastiche."

== Relation to other works ==
In addition to following up the original Santesson anthologies, the anthology was originally intended to have its own follow-up, to be titled The Mighty Adventurers and showcase some of the same authors. According to Price, Bob McLain, prospective publisher of the volume, suggested it instead be billed as a revival of Lin Carter's Flashing Swords! series; it duly appeared as such, under the title Lin Carter's Flashing Swords! #6, from Pulp Hero Press in July 2020.
