= Lin Carter's Flashing Swords! 6 =

2021 anthology edited by Robert Price

Lin Carter's Flashing Swords! #6
- Cover of first edition
- Editor: Robert M. Price
- Language: English
- Series: Flashing Swords!
- Genre: Fantasy
- Publisher: Pulp Hero Press
- Publication date: 2020
- Publication place: United States
- Media type: Print (paperback)
- Pages: 360
- ISBN: 978-1-68390-264-5
- Preceded by: Flashing Swords! #5: Demons and Daggers
- Followed by: Lin Carter's Flashing Swords! #7

Lin Carter's Flashing Swords! #6 is an anthology of fantasy stories in the sword and sorcery subgenre, edited by Robert M. Price. It was first published in trade paperback and ebook by Pulp Hero Press in July 2020, but was delisted by the publisher shortly after publication. A second edition with substantially different content was published in hardcover and trade paperback by Timaios Press in January 2021.

== Summary ==
The original edition collects twelve stories, eleven original and one previously published, by eleven authors, together with an introduction by Price. The second edition collects ten stories by eleven authors, together with Price's revised introduction. Only three stories are carried over from the first edition, while the remainder are new; the final piece is a graphic novella.

== Contents (first edition) ==
- "Introduction" (Robert M. Price)
- "The Island of Shadows" (Paul R. McNamee)
- "Godkiller" (Cliff Biggers)
- "Varla and the Mad Magician" (Glen Usher and Steve Lines)
- "Blood Games in the Temple of the Toad" (Frank Schildiner)
- "The Bloody Crooked One" (Charles R. Rutledge)
- "The Lion of Valentia" (Steve Dilks)
- "Immortals of Lemuria" (Robert M. Price)
- "The Tower in the Crimson Mist" (Adrian Cole)
- "Bellico and the Tower of Mouths" (Richard Toogood)
- "The Emerald Tablet" (Robert M. Price) (from Strange Sorcery no. 24, August 2017)
- "Tale of the Uncrowned Kings" (Steve Dilks)
- "A Twisted Branch of Yggdrasil" (D.M. Ritzlin)

== Contents (second edition) ==
Cover of second edition.

Italicized pieces were carried over from the first edition; all others are new to the second edition.

- "Flashing Words" (introduction) (Robert M. Price)
- "A Prince of Mars" (Lin Carter and Robert M. Price)
- "Curse of the White Witch" (Wayne Judge)
- "Bellico and the Tower of Mouths" (Richard Toogood)
- "Immortals of Lemuria" (Robert M. Price)
- "The Vanishing Conjurer" (Glynn Owen Barrass)
- "World of the Black Sun" (Pierre V. Comtois)
- "Boscastle and the Swamp Enchantress" (Jason Ross Cummings)
- "Varla and the Mad Magician" (Steve Lines and Glen M. Usher)
- "Hercules versus the Cyclops" (Santiago del Dardano Turann)
- "Tonga of Lemuria" (Clayton L. Hinkle)

== Controversy ==
As literary executor of Lin Carter, who was the editor behind the Flashing Swords! anthology series of the 1970s and 1980s, Robert M. Price projected the book as a revival and continuation of the original series. A controversy erupted on publication due to Price's introduction in which he criticizes feminism and the concept of rape culture, and expresses transphobic views. Contributing authors Cliff Biggers, Frank Schildiner, Charles R. Rutledge, and Paul R. McNamee all publicly withdrew their contributions in protest, stating that Price did not preview the introduction with them before publication, with publisher Pulp Hero Press delisting the book a few days after publication.

Price stated an intention to take the project to a different publisher, without the withdrawn stories and with the addition of new ones, an intention realized with the appearance of the second edition in January, 2021. It was, however, essentially a different work, lacking nine of the original version's twelve stories while adding seven.

== Reception ==
Reviewing the second edition at castaliahouse.com, Morgan Holmes characterizes the book as "a retro-sort of anthology with a number of vintage characters in new adventures by new writers. ... So, if you want to read new adventures of Thongor, Elak, and Ki-Gor, Flashing Swords #6 will scratch that itch."

== Relation to other works ==
Before producing the two editions of Flashing Swords! #6, Price edited a similar Sword and Sorcery anthology, The Mighty Warriors (Ulthar Press, 2018), showcasing some of the same authors whose works appeared in the first edition. In fact, according to Price, the first version of Flashing Swords! #6 was originally envisioned as a direct follow-up to The Mighty Warriors to be titled The Mighty Adventurers; he attributes the suggestion to instead bill it as a revival of the Flashing Swords series to Pulp Hero Press publisher Bob McLain.

The stories slated for the original version of Flashing Swords! #6 that were not carried over into the revised version were subsequently published elsewhere. Paul R. McNamee's "The Island of Shadows," Cliff Biggers's "Godkiller," Frank Schildiner's "Blood Games in the Temple of the Toad," and Charles R. Rutledge's "The Bloody Crooked One" reappeared in the anthology Blood on the Blade: Ten Tales of Slashing Swords and Sinister Sorcery (Flinch Books, 2021). Steve Dilks's "The Lion of Valentia" was later revised as "Intrigue in Aviene," in which form it was published in the May 2021 issue of the webzine Heroic Fantasy Quarterly. Adrian Cole's "The Tower in the Crimson Mist" and Steve Dilks's "Tale of the Uncrowned Kings" reappeared in the anthology Savage Scrolls, Volume One (Pulp Hero Press, 2020); the former was also included in Cole's collection Elak: Warrior of Atlantis (Parallel Universe Publications, 2024), and the latter was also issued as an ebook (Carnelian Press, 2023.) Price's own "The Emerald Tablet," itself a reprint from Strange Sorcery #24, August 2017, reappeared in the Richard L. Tierney collection Sorcery Against Caesar: The Complete Simon of Gitta Short Stories (Pickman's Press, 2020). D. M. Ritzlin's "A Twisted Branch of Yggdrasil" reappeared in his collection Necromancy in Nilztiria (DMR Books, 2020).
