= Savage Scrolls, Volume One =

- Cover of first edition
- Editor: Jason Ray Carney
- Language: English
- Genre: Fantasy
- Publisher: Pulp Hero Press
- Publication date: 2020
- Publication place: United States
- Media type: Print (paperback) and ebook
- ISBN: 978-1-68390-282-9

Savage Scrolls, Volume One: Thrilling Tales of Sword-and-Sorcery is an anthology of fantasy short stories in the sword and sorcery subgenre, edited by Jason Ray Carney. It was first published in trade paperback and ebook by Pulp Hero Press in November 2020, and takes its title from Savage Scrolls, Volume One: Scholarship from the Hyborian Age (2017), an earlier volume of literary criticism by Fred Blosser from the same publisher. Each was projected to be the first in a series; no further volumes of the Blosser title were forthcoming, but a second volume of the Carney title "is already in the works," with at least four projected in all.

== Summary ==
The book collects eight sword and sorcery tales of protagonists traditional in and new to the subgenre, the former including Henry Kuttner's Elak of Atlantis and Prince Raynor, David C. Smith's Oron, and James Enge's Morlock the Maker. Some are by the authors associated with the original works and others are pastiches by later writers. Two of the stories, Adrian Cole's "The Tower in the Crimson Mist" and Steve Dilks's "Tale of the Uncrowned Kings," were recycled from the publisher's aborted anthology Flashing Swords! #6 (July 2020).

== Contents ==
- "Publisher's Note" (Bob McLain)
- "Introduction" (Jason Ray Carney)
- "Tower in the Crimson Mist" (Elak of Atlantis) (Adrian Cole)
- "Tale of the Uncrowned Kings" (Erich Von Tormath and Zaran) (Steve Dilks)
- "The Eyes of the Scorpion" (Shamal the Warrior) (Steve Lines)
- "Born of the Serpent" (Oron) (David C. Smith)
- "Under the Basilisk Moon" (Prince Raynor) (Fred Blosser)
- "Slave Girls for Sacrifice" (Avok the Cytheran) (D. M. Ritzlin)
- "Crypt of Stars" (Hanuvar of Volanus) (Howard Andrew Jones)
- "Laws for the Blood" (Morlock the Maker) (James Enge)
- "About the Storytellers"

== Reception ==
John ONeill at blackgate.com extols the list of contributors and remarks of the book "I'm delighted to say it's a thoroughly professional production."
