= Lost Worlds (Carter short story collection) =

1980 short story collection by Lin Carter

- cover art from first edition
- Author: Lin Carter
- Language: English
- Genre: Fantasy
- Publisher: DAW Books
- Publication date: 1980
- Publication place: United States
- Media type: Print (paperback)
- Pages: 176
- ISBN: 0-87997-556-3
- OCLC: 7467421

Lost Worlds is a collection of fantasy short stories edited by American writer Lin Carter. It was first published in paperback by DAW Books in 1980. It was reissued in hardcover and paperback by Wildside Press in May 2008, and in ebook by Gateway/Orion in May 2020.

== Summary ==
The book collects eight stories by Carter, including three started by other writers and completed by Carter. It uses the subject of such "lost worlds" as Atlantis, Mu, Valusia, and other "sunken continents beyond memory," together with an introduction and afterword by the author.

== Contents ==
- Hyperborea
  - "The Scroll of Morloc" (by Clark Ashton Smith, completed by Carter) (from Fantastic v. 24, no. 6, Oct. 1975)
  - "The Stairs in the Crypt" (by Clark Ashton Smith, completed by Carter) (from Fantastic, v. 25, no. 4, Aug. 1976)
- Mu
  - "The Thing in the Pit"
- Lemuria
  - "Thieves of Zangabal" (from The Mighty Barbarians, 1969)
  - "Keeper of the Emerald Flame" (from The Mighty Swordsmen, 1970)
- Valusia
  - "Riders Beyond the Sunrise" (by Robert E. Howard, completed by Carter) (from King Kull, Sep. 1967)
- Antillia
  - "The Twelve Wizards of Ong" (from Kingdoms of Sorcery, Jan. 1976)
- Atlantis
  - "The Seal of Zaon Sathla" (from The Magic of Atlantis, Nov. 1970)

== Reception ==
The book was reviewed by Mark Willard in Science Fiction Review, Spring 1983.
