= Powers (comics) =

Comic book series

- The cover of Supergroup, a compilation of issues #15 to 20.

Publication information
- Publisher: Image Comics; Marvel Comics; Dark Horse Comics
- Schedule: Monthly
- Format: Ongoing series
- Genre: Superhero
- Publication date: April 2000 – September 2020; September 2025-present
- No. of issues: (vol. 1): 37 (vol. 2): 30 (vol. 3): 11; Bureau: 12 (vol. 4): 8, 1 graphic novel (vol. 5): ongoing
- Main character(s): Christian Walker; Deena Pilgrim

Creative team
- Created by: Brian Michael Bendis; Michael Avon Oeming
- Written by: Brian Michael Bendis
- Artist: Michael Avon Oeming
- Letterer(s): Brian Michael Bendis; Ken Bruzenak
- Colorist(s): Pat Garrahy; Peter Pantazis
- Editor(s): K. C. McCrory; Jamie S. Rich

Collected editions
- Who Killed Retro Girl?: ISBN 1-58240-183-7

Powers is a creator-owned comic book series written by Brian Michael Bendis and illustrated by Michael Avon Oeming. The series' first volume was published by Image Comics from 2000 to 2004, the latter moving to Marvel Comics as a part of its Icon imprint. In 2018 it moved to DC Comics as part of its Jinxworld imprint. The Jinxworld imprint moved in 2021 to Dark Horse Comics. The characters and its creators appear in Crossover by Image Comics.

Combining the genres of superhero fiction, crime noir and the police procedural, the series follows the lives of two homicide detectives, Christian Walker and Deena Pilgrim, assigned to investigate cases involving people with superhuman abilities, who are referred to colloquially as "powers".

== Publication history ==
=== Conception ===
Brian Michael Bendis, Michael Avon Oeming and David W. Mack became friends while all three were working on individual small press projects. Bendis says that he also began to "analyz[e] why it was that I [had] never attempted to write a superhero comic" at the time, while he was writing crime books such as Jinx and Goldfish, despite his love of the genre. Concluding that Frank Miller's The Dark Knight Returns and Alan Moore and Dave Gibbons' Watchmen had sufficiently explored the genre, Bendis decided to work in other genres. The series' concept was derived from his love of crime fiction and police procedurals in general, as well as specific works such as Homicide: A Year on the Killing Streets, Janis Joplin's biography, Taxi Driver, T-Men, Traffic and Visions Of Light: The Art of Cinematography, and would take the form of a Behind the Music-type look at superheroes. Powers, Oeming says, is "a superhero universe seen through the eyes of the police... [as] observed by the media" and everyday individuals. Bendis' intention was to view the "cliches of the superhero genre through the harder eyes of the cops", but with the added layer that (echoing "Behind the Music") "every arc has some footing in a famous rock star story". Bendis' scripts are often compiled from "a list of scenes", eschewing "the big exploding ending" in favor of a "character-driven or psychological ending". Indeed, in experimenting with plots, the duo swiftly moved beyond 'mere' police procedurals (despite those being both creators' "favorite stories"), constantly pushing each other creatively in new ways. In conceiving plots for the series, Bendis emphasizes the purpose and themes in the narrative over "just being cool", and allowing the theme to dictate the direction of the story.

Bendis would collaborate with Oeming, who had already expressed interest in producing a crime/noir comic with Bendis, inspired by his attempts to get work on The Batman Adventures to do a book in a style reminiscent of Bruce Timm and Alex Toth. Bendis cites two images produced by Oeming (one for Bendis' Jinx, and one for David Mack's series Kabuki) as originating the then-experimental "Powers' style" and "inspir[ing] everything in [Powers]". Indeed, Bendis and Oeming's first collaboration was "Mall Outing" in Jinx: True Crime Confessions. It is included in Little Deaths "for Powers completists and curiosity's sake". Oeming has noted that, although seen as an overtly "cartoony" style, the artwork does not appeal to children, which helps sidestep the potential problem of the book, which contains mature content, being purchased by customers younger than its intended audience.

Despite both creators only having produced work in black and white before Powers, Bendis envisioned Powers in color, and convinced Oeming that it could work, despite the dramatically higher number of sales required to sustain a color comic. Bendis also convinced Oeming that the book should juxtapose both the superhero and crime noir genres, as Oeming initially shied away from the former. Bendis writes in the 'Sketchbook' section of the Powers: Who Killed Retro Girl? TPB that "one of the rules of film noir is that the city itself should be considered a lead character". To this end, he made Oeming watch Visions of Light, a documentary by the American Cinematographers Institute about the art of lighting in film, which he saw as important to the feel of comics also. According to Oeming, both he and Bendis do copious research for their projects, and that before he began the series, he would do ride-alongs with police, meet police officials, and take extensive photo reference of their equipment.

=== Launch ===
Powers was initially pitched to DC Comics, after DC inquired of Bendis and Oeming what they were hoping to create. Bendis ultimately retained ownership of his creation, which allows him complete freedom as the writer.

Bendis and Oeming were initially worried, after having produced but not solicited two issues of the series, to learn that writer Alan Moore was preparing what was to become Top 10 for America's Best Comics. Although the creators had been confident that the idea of a book juxtaposing superheroes and the police procedural had not been done previously, the knowledge that Moore was doing something similar nearly led them to abandon the series, before discovering that Top Ten featured superhero police officers and a different enough approach that led them to feel safe in continuing.

Powers was initially previewed in a series of original strips which ran in Cliff Biggers and Ward Batty's Comic Shop News, a comics-industry periodical available from many comic shops. The eight strips were colored and lettered by Bendis (before initial colorist/letterer Pat Garrahy became involved) and complemented the up-coming series as a companion piece in newspaper strip form. The strip was later serialized at the online comics magazine PopImage.com.

Debuting with sales of 12,500 (around the "break even" mark for a color comic, although "like ten thousand more" than Bendis' previous book, Torso), Powers was faced with an uncertain future, as sales of comics tend to dwindle over subsequent issues. Image Comics publisher Jim Valentino and head of marketing Anthony Bozzi, however, both read and enjoyed the first three issues (lettered and laid out by Bendis himself, a hang-over from his earlier fully creator-owned works where he took on the complete roles of several individuals), with Bozzi reportedly saying: "If we can't make a book like POWERS sell we really should stop making comics". Image offered to double-ship the second issue, effectively doubling the orders for that issue as an attempt to boost sales: the gamble worked, and issue #1 was soon reprinted, while according to Bendis, "issues #3–11 saw an upswing" in sales every issue. The reported Diamond pre-order figures show sales climbing above 23,000 by issue #7, and topping 30,000 with issue #14 and stabilizing between 25,000 and 30,000 for the remainder of the titles' Image run. These strong sales allowed Oeming to quit his job as a security guard, while Bendis' launch of Ultimate Spider-Man had a positive effect on Powers' sales as readers searched out his comics.

=== Move to Icon ===
In 2004, Marvel launched a new imprint for creator-owned material, open by invitation only to Marvel creators. Powers was (with Kabuki) the first series to debut under this new line, in large part due to Bendis' preeminent role as a Marvel author. The move worked well for the comic, "gain[ing] new readers" in the move from Image to Icon, with the initial issue garnering pre-orders of over 40,000 (and settling around the 30,000 mark with issues #7–8). In part, the move was precipitated by Jim Valentino stepping down as publisher of Image Comics, after having been the driving force in the launch of Powers (as well as publishing Bendis' earlier works Jinx and Torso). Bendis notes that his relationships with publishers "are always with people, not with logos".

For their anniversary issue (Volume 2, issue #12 from Icon), Bendis and Oeming had planned to swap roles – Oeming writing and Bendis drawing, but Bendis suffered an injury to his cornea stopping him from drawing the full issue, although he did provide a cover for the issue. Powers Volume 3 launched with issue number one in November 2009. After a year-long hiatus, Powers resumed circulation with Volume 3 #8 on February 8, 2012.

Bendis has a "Powers idea-list" and the two have "enough stories left in [them], and... the audience to keep the book going" for a while yet. Both have repeatedly stated that they know the ending, not in terms of time frame or issue number, but as a final act of closure, having "promised to never write or draw Powers beyond the amount of fresh ideas" they have.

=== Revival at Dark Horse Comics ===
In September 2025, a new 12-issue series titled Powers 25 began, published by Dark Horse Comics.

== Inspirations ==
- Retro Girl – inspired by Pearl: The Obsessions and Passions of Janis Joplin. The first incarnation of Retro Girl's name is Janis.
- Olympia – based on Pamela Des Barres' memories, I'm with the Band: Confessions of a Groupie, in which she detailed her many liaisons with musicians.
- FG-3 – inspired by the Fugees, of which Bendis is an ardent fan, and whose breakup greatly upset him.
- "Roleplay" – inspired by tribute bands and what Bendis calls "the whole wannabe aspect of life", coupled with the lifestyle of role-playing gamers.
- "Anarchy" – inspired by punk subculture and the anarchy mindset.
- "Sellouts" – inspired by Bendis' favorite episodes of Behind the Music, which focus on bands characterized by strife and conflict among its members, who feel like "outsiders in their own bands".

== Synopsis ==
Powers is set in a world where superpowers are relatively common but not mundane. It follows the lives of two detectives, Christian Walker and Deena Pilgrim, police officers in a Chicago Homicide department devoted to cases that involve "powers" (people with superpowers). Walker himself used to be a costumed superhero named Diamond, but became a police officer after he lost his abilities.

=== Who Killed Retro Girl? (Powers Vol. 1, #1–6) ===
The first arc introduces Walker saving a young girl named Calista from a convict with a jetpack. Walker is later introduced to Pilgrim as they investigate their first case, the murder of a popular superhero named Retro Girl, who is found dead outside a school with her throat slit. It was said that she was pregnant with Diamond's baby although he was unaware. As the investigation deepens, Deena discovers Walker's past as Diamond as well as his relationships with Retro Girl and the controversial superhero Zora.

Issue #7 was a stand-alone issue in which Walker was teamed with famous graphic novelist Warren Ellis.

=== Roleplay (Powers Vol. 1, #8–11) ===
Walker and Pilgrim investigate a series of murders at a college campus. All of the victims belonged to a roleplaying club in which the members dressed up as superheroes. Evidence suggests the killings are being performed by a notorious supervillain.

=== Little Deaths (Powers Vol. 1, #7, #12–14, and Annual #1) ===
Walker and Pilgrim investigate the death of Olympia, a renowned superhero who is found dead in a sleazy apartment with no clothing and no sign of injury. Information emerges about Olympia's controversial sex life, which may have played a role in his death.

Powers #7 "Ride Along" included a guest appearance starring Warren Ellis.

The Powers Annual #1 deals with a superhero who is arrested and tried for murdering a supervillain.

=== Supergroup (Powers Vol. 1, #15–20) ===
Walker and Pilgrim investigate the death of a member of FG-3, a federally employed and corporate funded trio. Evidence leads Walker to believe a federal cover-up is taking place, and as the investigation spirals out of control both professionally and personally (Zora is killed during a confrontation with FG-3), Walker leaves the police force after exposing the cover-up on television.

=== Anarchy (Powers Vol. 1, #21–24) ===
Pilgrim and her new partner investigate a series of superhero murders being committed by a group claiming inspiration from the killer of Retro Girl. Walker is brought into the case when the leader of the group is arrested and demands to see him, and Pilgrim's new partner is killed during an assassination attempt on Walker's life. Walker is brought back onto the force after the case is resolved.

=== The Sellouts (Powers Vol. 1, #25–30) ===
Walker and Pilgrim investigate the murder of a member of the popular superhero team Unity, which had been active in the 1980s but subsequently disbanded. The investigation leads to a particular superhero who oversteps his power and authority and causes international devastation, as a result of which all powers are declared illegal by the United States Government.

=== Forever (Powers Vol. 1, #31–37) ===
Walker's history as a hero is fully explored, from his origins to the loss of his powers in 1986, as well as his relationships with other superheroes such as Retro Girl, Triphammer, and Zora.

=== Legends (Powers Vol. 2, #1–6) ===
Walker and Pilgrim attempt to deal with the onslaught of supervillain activity following the ban on powers. Pilgrim is captured and tortured by a target of their investigation, and subsequently gains superpowers of her own. Calista assists Walker and Pilgrim by revealing herself as the reincarnated Retro Girl, and she subsequently inspires other heroes to resume fighting crime despite the ban.

=== Psychotic (Powers Vol. 2, #7–12) ===
Walker and Pilgrim investigate the murder of the Blackguard, a superhero whose power stemmed from a magic jewel. The Blackguard's nemesis is also found murdered, and the detectives believe the jewel is the reason for these events. During the investigation, Pilgrim uses her powers to kill her ex-boyfriend after he tries to kill her.

=== Cosmic (Powers Vol. 2, #13–18) ===
Walker and Pilgrim investigate the death of a seemingly normal person who is later revealed to be a member of an alien organization called the Millennium Guard. Pilgrim becomes aware that she is being investigated by Internal Affairs for her recent actions, and Walker is contacted by the Millennium Guard to take the place of the earlier victim. When he accepts, he is given new powers. Walker also begins a romantic relationship with a witness to the murder.

=== Secret Identity (Powers Vol. 2, #19–24) ===
Walker and Pilgrim investigate the murder of Queen Noir's husband Strike. Queen Noir is the leader of a team called "The Heroes" which had emerged during the "Legends" arc. As the investigation continues, more and more members of The Heroes are killed, and evidence points to Queen Noir as the prime suspect. During the case, Pilgrim discovers that Walker has powers, and then disappears.

=== The 25 Coolest Dead Superheroes of All Time (Powers Vol. 2, #25–30 and Annual 2008) ===
A "Powers Virus" spreads throughout the city, and numerous young girls are falling victim to it. Pilgrim is the primary suspect, as the powers she contracted in the "Legends" arc are revealed to be a strain of the virus. Walker attempts to discover the source of the epidemic while Pilgrim does her own investigation. Pilgrim is exonerated when she helps crack the case, and instead of dealing with the bad publicity that revealing all her activities would bring, she is essentially bought off by the city and leaves the force.

=== Z (Powers Vol. 3, #1–6) ===
A year after the end of the last arc, Walker and his new partner Enki Sunrise investigate the murder of Z, whom Walker teamed up with in World War II. Sunrise continues her covert Internal Affairs-directed investigation of Walker, but slowly becomes more hesitant to inform on him. Walker proposes to his girlfriend Heather, but she is receiving visions detailing a forthcoming apocalyptic battle, and leaves without telling him she is pregnant. Pilgrim returns to Chicago, now a member of the F.B.I.'s powers task force.

=== Gods (Powers Vol. 3, #7–11) ===
After closing the Z case, members of The Golden Ones, a god-like team of heroes, are targeted by a serial killer, with the mother of the murdered Damocles attempting to gain revenge on the world by launching a titanic assault on Chicago. Walker's ex-fiancée Heather returns and is killed in a method similar to her visions, and Walker then joins the other powers in battling Damocles' mother, in defiance of Millennium's restrictions on his activities. They succeed in defeating her, but in the aftermath of the battle, Walker, Triphammer and Calista are missing, and all powers-related cases are permanently assigned to the F.B.I., with Captain Cross and Detective Sunrise being hired by the now vastly understaffed bureau.

=== Undercover (Powers Bureau, #1–6) ===
Newly brought on as Federal agents, Walker goes undercover to try and infiltrate a criminal organization breeding powers babies. Pilgrim is exposed to the Power who is supplying the syndicate with semen, and learns that she is pregnant.

=== Icons (Powers Bureau, #7–12) ===
Agents Pilgrim and Walker travel to Hollywood to investigate the death of several powers and uncover one of the darkest secrets of American superpower history.

=== All the New Powers (Powers Vol. 4, #1–6) ===
Walker and Pilgrim are now faced with the most difficult decision they've ever had to make, including the discovery of a power no one has ever seen before.

=== The Best Ever (Powers Vol. 4, #7–8, graphic novel) ===
Spanning decades and genres while hearkening back to its earliest origins, the story of superhero turned homicide detective Christian Walker comes to a fantastic conclusion. An original graphic novel incorporates issues #7 and 8 of Powers, Vol. 4.

=== Powers 25 (Powers Vol. 5) ===
Special homicide officer Detective Kutter and her new partner Moebius Moon track a series of unsolvable powers murders under the watchful eyes of Captains Deena Pilgrim and Enki Sunrise.

== Characters ==
Despite the high mortality rate, there are several recurrent characters in Powers beyond the main two. Oeming has praised Bendis' writing in giving a "real depth" to even minor figures, writing that he particularly enjoys Bendis writing "a character as an asshole and then we [the reader] learn they are more valiant than most of the [other] characters".

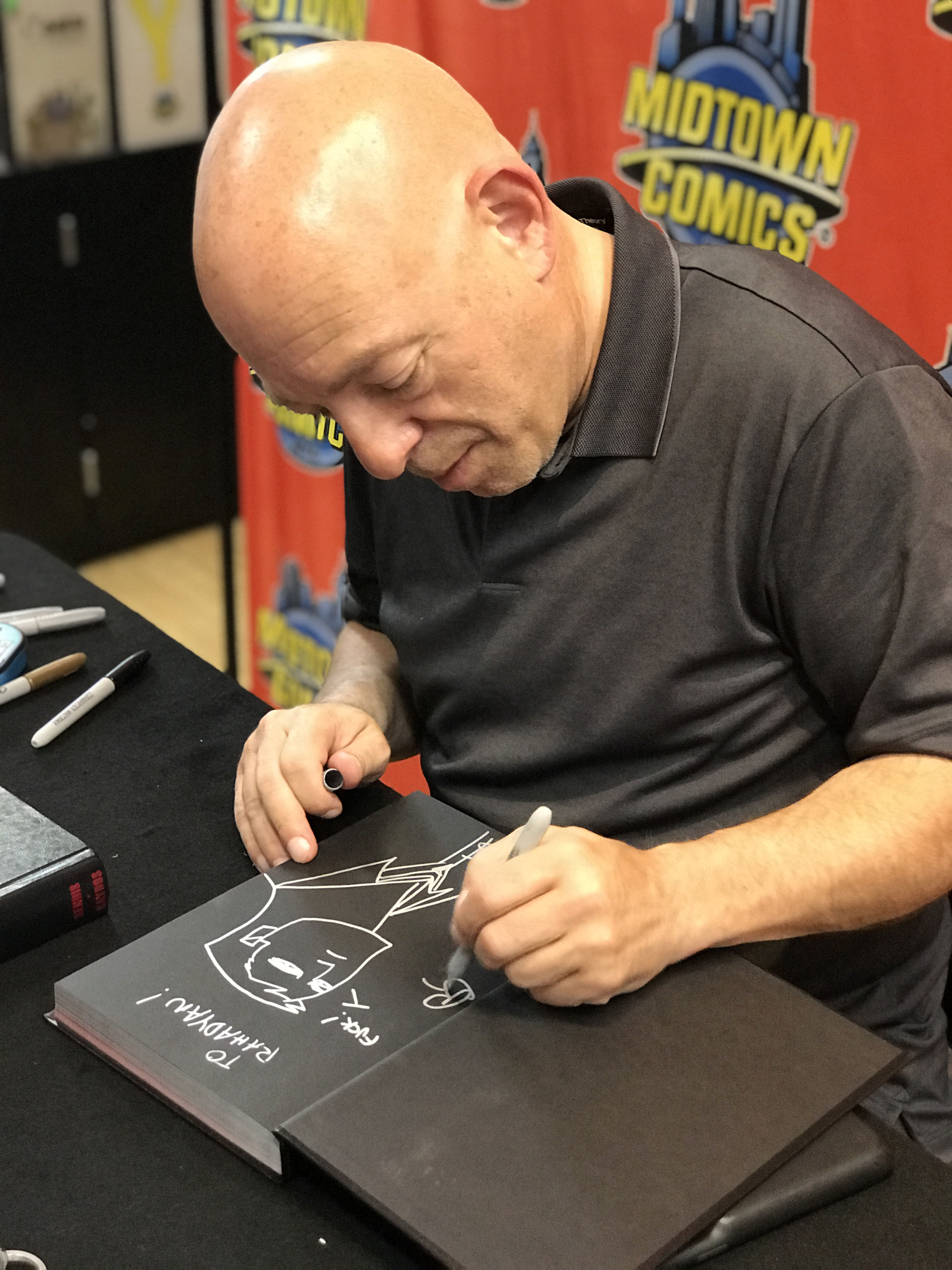
Writer Brian Michael Bendis sketching Christian Walker in a copy of the hardcopy Definitive Collection, at Midtown Comics in Manhattan.

=== Main characters ===
- Christian Walker is a homicide detective for the Powers division. Veteran cop Walker was previously a power called Diamond before losing his abilities. There are many things about him that are still coming to light (such as his extreme longevity and immortality – "a history that may stretch back to the beginning of humankind"). His contacts with the "Powers" can be both a help and a hindrance to his investigations. Despite his longevity, he "still doesn't know how to communicate", being "locked up in his own brain" in the words of Oeming.
- Deena Pilgrim: Beginning as a rookie, Pilgrim started off as a lowly police officer on the streets of Chicago, under a corrupt captain named Adlard (who worked for Mama Joon, a powerful crime boss). Adlard was murdered seven years prior, timing this just before Deena's transfer request to work with Walker as part of the Powers Homicide department. Little else is known of her past, though she has revealed that her brother was a Power called "Hoodwink". Deena's character is based in part on Bendis' wife, and partly on Oeming's, who are "both kind of rambunctious, funny, and constantly say[ing] stuff that is shocking". She was rated as the 24th best comic book character by Empire magazine.

=== Supporting characters ===
- Retro Girl: The first arc details the death of Retro Girl (first name Janis, last name unrevealed), who is a popular and powerful super-heroine. Retro Girl is in fact a legacy of women – with or without powers – who are continuously reincarnated. Walker has met several incarnations in his lifetime, but he has only vague recollections of them. The latest incarnation is Calista Secor, a young girl he saved.
- Captain Cross is the head of the department, and has known Walker since the 80's during and after his stint as the super-hero Diamond. They met when Diamond helped him with a case, the exact nature of which has still to be revealed. It has been noted that Walker's job might be a gift from him.
- Detective Kutter: Bendis once explained that at least one of his characters had to be an id. Kutter is rude, crude and at times interfering, but despite his coarse personality he was a good detective, who merely was "constantly saying inappropriate things". He was killed during the "Legends" arc when an apparently dead "power" killed him.
- Triphammer: Real name Harley Cohen, an Iron Man-like character, he chose to disappear after the events of "Who Killed Retro Girl", in which he kills the man who has been targeting powers and was responsible for the death of Retro Girl. He briefly reappears in "Supergroup" after having had extensive plastic surgery, and in "The 25 Coolest Dead Superheroes of All Time" he develops a cure for the Powers virus. It is also revealed in this story arc that he has three daughters, one of which was murdered in this arc. He is the inventor of the "power drainer", a device capable of temporarily neutralizing the abilities of super-powered individuals. He died in the "Gods" arc.
- Calista Secor, a.k.a. Retro Girl: Her character traits are allegedly "based on Mike Oeming".
- Zora: A power, like Christian Walker she appeared to have immortality, but unlike him, she possessed a greater capacity for memory. She and Walker knew each other for years but according to her, for much longer since the time of Ancient China. They were shortly engaged before she was killed by a government-created power known as "Boogie Girl" who went insane. Zora claimed that her abilities came from her complete lack of belief in all things spiritual and her acceptance that she was her own God.

=== Cameos ===
One of the series' recurring motifs, which begins in issue #4, is the liberal use of cameos. Investigating their first major crime, Walker and Pilgrim question 32 superheroes (and five pages later, 32 supervillains) for leads. Described by Bendis as both "one of [his and Oeming's] best ideas" and a "'logistical nightmare'", many of these cameo-characters were lent by "well-known comic book creator friends" of Bendis and Oeming to add a level of metatextuality and flesh out the wider Powers universe. In addition to the "brand new super hero and villain creations" solicited, some creators allowed the appearance of their well-established (creator-owned) characters, such as Mike Allred's Madman, Erik Larsen's Savage Dragon and Jim Valentino's Shadowhawk. Other creators who have lent their time and characters to Powers include: Angel Medina, Dan Brereton, Paul Jenkins, Neil Vokes, Judd Winick, Jim Krueger, Mike Baron, Phil Jimenez, Scott Morse, Marc Andreyko, Ed Brubaker, Joe Quesada and David Mack.

Powers issue #7 "Ride Along" introduced author Warren Ellis into the Powers universe, as a writer of "graphic novels" who accompanies Walker on a "ride along" for research purposes. The Powers Ellis discusses the domination of the comics industry by superheroes and the medium of comics itself, before being revealed at the end of the issue, in a super-metatextual moment, as the author of the in-Powers-universe comic entitled "Powers". In issue #23, an analogue of Dark Horse Comics editor Diana Schutz is interviewed on the problematic nature of vigilante superheroes who exist above the normal system of law, and why non-powered individuals might feel betrayed by, wary or resentful of them.

=== Covers ===
In his introduction to the bonus materials section of Powers: Roleplay, Bendis highlights five superhero comic cover clichés, and then explains that "Mike and I decided very early on to create theme covers for each storyarc." "Roleplay" (issues #8–11)'s theme used "album cover designs from albums, in Bendis's words, "you would find in a college dorm room". The covers homaged were:

- Issue #8 – Janis Joplin and Big Brother and the Holding Company's "Cheap Thrills", original drawn by Robert Crumb
- Issue #9 – The Beatles' "A Hard Day's Night" (UK release)
- Issue #10 – Sinéad O'Connor's "I Do Not Want What I Haven't Got"
- Issue #11 – The Beatles' "The Beatles/'The White Album'"

Issues #12–14 (collected in Little Deaths) were drawn in the style of trashy gossip/celebrity tabloid magazines. The covers were styled after the following magazines:

- Issue #12 – People
- Issue #13 – Hello!
- Issue #14 – Globe
  - The Powers website – P! Online – is modelled after Entertainment Weekly's "E! Online".

Other covers are homages to a number of things, including:

- Issue #26 – Alex Toth's rendition of DC Comics' Super Friends

Under Icon, some of Volume 2's covers have been drawn in the style of various classic movie posters, specifically #7–10.

== Daily strip ==
The first through fourth story arcs, "Who Killed Retro Girl?", "Roleplay", "Little Deaths" and "Supergroup", were published online in a daily page-per-day format, and the fifth arc, "Anarchy", was being released but has since ceased its release days. The story "Little Deaths" is also incomplete:

- "Who Killed Retro Girl?"
- "Roleplay"
- "Little Deaths"
- "Supergroup"
- "Anarchy"

== Recognition and influence ==
The series won the Eisner Award for Best New Series for 2001 and Brian Michael Bendis won the Best Writer Eisner Award in 2002 and 2003.

Greg Rucka and Ed Brubaker, whom Bendis and Oeming view as "amazing crime writers", created Gotham Central, which Bendis and Oeming view as one of many Powers-like comics influenced by their work. Bendis notes that Rucka and Brubaker gave himself and Oeming a "heads up" that they were preparing a "cop book in the DC Universe" and entirely separate from the plethora of titles which seem to merely be attempting to ape Powers.

== Television adaptations ==
In March 2015, a television adaptation of Powers premiered on the PlayStation Network, the PSN's first original programming. Two seasons were produced.

In March 2026, an adult animated television series is in development at Netflix. Co-creators Bendis and Oeming are heavily involved in the show's development.

== Collected editions ==
=== Trade paperback collections ===
#	Title	Publisher	Year	ISBN	Reprints
1	Who Killed Retro Girl?	Image Comics	2000	ISBN 1-58240-183-7	Collects The reprinted material is, in whole or in part, from: Powers #1–6; The Powers Comic Shop News strips; Full script to issue #1; Sketchbook: Characters of Powers; Sketchbook: World of Powers; Cover gallery & sketches; Cameo identification
1	Credits and full notes: Writer(s) / Brian Michael Bendis; Penciller(s) / Michael Avon Oeming; Colorist(s) / Pat Garrahy; Letterer(s) / Pat Garrahy; The Powers Comic Shop News strips were originally presented in Comic Shop News, and lettered by Bendis.				Collects The reprinted material is, in whole or in part, from: Powers #1–6; The Powers Comic Shop News strips; Full script to issue #1; Sketchbook: Characters of Powers; Sketchbook: World of Powers; Cover gallery & sketches; Cameo identification
2	Roleplay	Image Comics	2002	ISBN 1-58240-232-9	Collects The reprinted material is, in whole or in part, from: Powers #8–11; Anatomy of a cover concept; "Powers" that be: Five minutes with Mike Oeming
2	Credits and full notes: Writer(s) / Brian Michael Bendis; Penciller(s) / Michael Avon Oeming; Colorist(s) / Pat Garrahy; Letterer(s) / Pat Garrahy				Collects The reprinted material is, in whole or in part, from: Powers #8–11; Anatomy of a cover concept; "Powers" that be: Five minutes with Mike Oeming
3	Little Deaths	Image Comics	2003	ISBN 1-58240-269-8	Collects The reprinted material is, in whole or in part, from: Powers #7, #12–14; Powers Annual #1; Powers Activity and Coloring Book; Jinx True Crime Confessions: "Mall Outing AKA Keys"; Brian Michael Bendis interview (from Herorealm.com); Cover gallery & sketch book
3	Credits and full notes: Writer(s) / Brian Michael Bendis; Penciller(s) / Michael Avon Oeming; Colorist(s) / Pat Garrahy, Peter Pantazis; Letterer(s) / Pat Garrahy, Ken Bruzenak				Collects The reprinted material is, in whole or in part, from: Powers #7, #12–14; Powers Annual #1; Powers Activity and Coloring Book; Jinx True Crime Confessions: "Mall Outing AKA Keys"; Brian Michael Bendis interview (from Herorealm.com); Cover gallery & sketch book
4	Supergroup	Image Comics	2003	ISBN 1-58240-309-0	Collects The reprinted material is, in whole or in part, from: Powers #15–20; "How to Make Powers" from Draw! magazine #5 (TwoMorrows); Cover gallery
4	Credits and full notes: Writer(s) / Brian Michael Bendis; Penciller(s) / Michael Avon Oeming; Colorist(s) / Peter Pantazis; Letterer(s) / Ken Bruzenak				Collects The reprinted material is, in whole or in part, from: Powers #15–20; "How to Make Powers" from Draw! magazine #5 (TwoMorrows); Cover gallery
5	Anarchy	Image Comics	2003	ISBN 1-58240-331-7	Collects The reprinted material is, in whole or in part, from: Powers #21–24; Oeming interviews Bendis and vice versa; Walker statue designs; Cover gallery
5	Credits and full notes: Writer(s) / Brian Michael Bendis; Penciller(s) / Michael Avon Oeming; Colorist(s) / Peter Pantazis; Letterer(s) / Ken Bruzenak				Collects The reprinted material is, in whole or in part, from: Powers #21–24; Oeming interviews Bendis and vice versa; Walker statue designs; Cover gallery
6	The Sellouts	Icon Comics	2004	ISBN 0-7851-1582-X	Collects The reprinted material is, in whole or in part, from: Powers #25–30; "Becoming a Real Artist" from Sketch; Cover gallery
6	Credits and full notes: Writer(s) / Brian Michael Bendis; Penciller(s) / Michael Avon Oeming; Colorist(s) / Peter Pantazis; Letterer(s) / Ken Bruzenak; Full interview title: "Becoming a Real Artist: An interview with Michael Avon Oeming conducted by Bill Love"				Collects The reprinted material is, in whole or in part, from: Powers #25–30; "Becoming a Real Artist" from Sketch; Cover gallery
7	Forever	Icon Comics	2004	ISBN 0-7851-1656-7	Collects The reprinted material is, in whole or in part, from: Powers #31–37; The script for issue #31; The gallery; Cover gallery
7	Credits and full notes: Writer(s) / Brian Michael Bendis; Penciller(s) / Michael Avon Oeming; Colorist(s) / Peter Pantazis; Letterer(s) / Ken Bruzenak; Issue #31's script is "The Infamous Monkey Issue" script.				Collects The reprinted material is, in whole or in part, from: Powers #31–37; The script for issue #31; The gallery; Cover gallery
8	Legends	Icon Comics	2005	ISBN 0-7851-1742-3	Collects The reprinted material is, in whole or in part, from: Powers Vol. 2 #1–6; Cover gallery; The gallery (sketches from Oeming)
8	Credits and full notes: Writer(s) / Brian Michael Bendis; Penciller(s) / Michael Avon Oeming; Colorist(s) / Peter Pantazis; Letterer(s) / Ken Bruzenak				Collects The reprinted material is, in whole or in part, from: Powers Vol. 2 #1–6; Cover gallery; The gallery (sketches from Oeming)
9	Psychotic	Icon Comics	2006	ISBN 0-7851-1743-1	Collects The reprinted material is, in whole or in part, from: Powers Vol. 2 #7–12; "Definitive Powers Interview"; Cover gallery
9	Credits and full notes: Writer(s) / Brian Michael Bendis; Penciller(s) / Michael Avon Oeming; Colorist(s) / Peter Pantazis; Letterer(s) / Ken Bruzenak				Collects The reprinted material is, in whole or in part, from: Powers Vol. 2 #7–12; "Definitive Powers Interview"; Cover gallery
10	Cosmic	Icon Comics	2007	ISBN 0-7851-2260-5	Collects The reprinted material is, in whole or in part, from: Powers Vol. 2 #13–18; The script from issue #16; Sketch gallery; Cover gallery
10	Credits and full notes: Writer(s) / Brian Michael Bendis; Penciller(s) / Michael Avon Oeming; Colorist(s) / Peter Pantazis; Letterer(s) / Ken Bruzenak				Collects The reprinted material is, in whole or in part, from: Powers Vol. 2 #13–18; The script from issue #16; Sketch gallery; Cover gallery
11	Secret Identity	Icon Comics	2008	ISBN 0-7851-2261-3	Collects The reprinted material is, in whole or in part, from: Powers Vol. 2 #19–24; Cover gallery; The script from issue #23
11	Credits and full notes: Writer(s) / Brian Michael Bendis; Penciller(s) / Michael Avon Oeming; Colorist(s) / Peter Pantazis; Letterer(s) / Ken Bruzenak, Chris Eliopoulos; Editor(s) / James Lucas Jones, C. B. Cebulski				Collects The reprinted material is, in whole or in part, from: Powers Vol. 2 #19–24; Cover gallery; The script from issue #23
12	The 25 Coolest Dead Superheroes of all Time	Icon Comics	2009	ISBN 0-7851-2262-1	Collects The reprinted material is, in whole or in part, from: Powers Vol. 2 #25–30; Annual 2008; Cover gallery
12	Credits and full notes: Writer(s) / Brian Michael Bendis; Penciller(s) / Michael Avon Oeming; Colorist(s) / Peter Pantazis, Nick Filardi; Letterer(s) / Chris Eliopoulos; Editor(s) / C. B. Cebulski				Collects The reprinted material is, in whole or in part, from: Powers Vol. 2 #25–30; Annual 2008; Cover gallery
13	Z	Icon Comics	2010	ISBN 978-0-7851-4593-6	Collects The reprinted material is, in whole or in part, from: Powers Vol. 3 #1–6; Cover gallery
13	Credits and full notes: Writer(s) / Brian Michael Bendis; Penciller(s) / Michael Avon Oeming				Collects The reprinted material is, in whole or in part, from: Powers Vol. 3 #1–6; Cover gallery
14	Gods	Icon Comics	2012	ISBN 978-0785145943	Collects The reprinted material is, in whole or in part, from: Powers Vol. 3 #7–11; Cover gallery
14	Credits and full notes: Writer(s) / Brian Michael Bendis; Penciller(s) / Michael Avon Oeming				Collects The reprinted material is, in whole or in part, from: Powers Vol. 3 #7–11; Cover gallery
1	Bureau: Undercover	Icon Comics	2013	ISBN 978-0785166023	Collects The reprinted material is, in whole or in part, from: Powers: Bureau Vol. 1 #1–6; Cover gallery
1	Credits and full notes: Writer(s) / Brian Michael Bendis; Penciller(s) / Michael Avon Oeming; Colorist(s) / Nick Filardi; Letterer(s) / Chris Eliopoulos, Clayton Cowles; Editor(s) / Jennifer Grünwald				Collects The reprinted material is, in whole or in part, from: Powers: Bureau Vol. 1 #1–6; Cover gallery
2	Bureau: Icons	Icon Comics	2014	ISBN 978-0785189183	Collects The reprinted material is, in whole or in part, from: Powers: Bureau Vol. 2 #7–12; Cover gallery
2	Credits and full notes: Writer(s) / Brian Michael Bendis; Penciller(s) / Michael Avon Oeming; Colorist(s) / Nick Filardi; Letterer(s) / Chris Eliopoulos; Editor(s) / Jennifer Grünwald				Collects The reprinted material is, in whole or in part, from: Powers: Bureau Vol. 2 #7–12; Cover gallery
1	All the New Powers	Icon Comics	2016	ISBN 978-0-7851-9745-4	Collects The reprinted material is, in whole or in part, from: Powers Vol. 4 #1–6; Cover gallery
1	Credits and full notes: Writer(s) / Brian Michael Bendis; Penciller(s) / Michael Avon Oeming; Colorist(s) / Nick Filardi; Letterer(s) / Chris Eliopoulos, Joe Sabino; Editor(s) / Jennifer Grünwald				Collects The reprinted material is, in whole or in part, from: Powers Vol. 4 #1–6; Cover gallery
2	The Best Ever	Jinxworld	2020	ISBN 978-1401298883	Collects The reprinted material is, in whole or in part, from: Powers Vol. 4 #7–8, new story material; Cover gallery
2	Credits and full notes: Writer(s) / Brian Michael Bendis; Penciller(s) / Michael Avon Oeming; Colorist(s) / Nick Filardi; Letterer(s) / Deron Bennett				Collects The reprinted material is, in whole or in part, from: Powers Vol. 4 #7–8, new story material; Cover gallery

Note: The full title of all volumes listed here start with "Powers: ".

=== Others ===
- Powers: The Definitive Collection Vol. 1 hardcover (collects Vol. 1 #1–11, Powers Activity And Coloring Book; ISBN 0-7851-1805-5)
- Powers: The Definitive Collection Vol. 2 hardcover (collects Vol. 1 #12–24, Annual 1; ISBN 0-7851-2440-3)
- Powers: The Definitive Collection Vol. 3 hardcover (collects Vol. 1 #25–37; ISBN 0-7851-3309-7)
- Powers: The Definitive Collection Vol. 4 hardcover (collects Vol. 2 #1–18; ISBN 0-7851-5316-0)
- Powers: The Definitive Collection Vol. 5 hardcover (collects Vol. 2 #19–30, Annual 2008; ISBN 0-7851-6612-2)
- Powers: The Definitive Collection Vol. 6 hardcover (collects Vol. 3 #1–11; ISBN 0-7851-9149-6)
- Powers: The Definitive Collection Vol. 7: The Bureau Saga hardcover (collects Bureau Vol. 1+2 #1–12 ISBN 978-1302907402)

DC/Jinxworld reprints:

- Powers: Book One trade paperback (2018, collects Vol. 1 #1–11, the complete Powers comic strips from Comic Shop News, the Powers Coloring/Activity Book; ISBN 978-1401287450)
- Powers: Book Two trade paperback (2019, collects Vol. 1 #12–24; Annual 1; ISBN 978-1401287481)
- Powers: Book Three trade paperback (2019, collects Vol. 1 #25–37; ISBN 978-1401290504)
- Powers: Book Four trade paperback (2019, collects Vol. 2 #1–18; ISBN 978-1401290511)
- Powers: Book Five trade paperback (2019, collects Vol. 2 #19–30, Annual 2008; ISBN 978-1401291273)
- Powers: Book Six trade paperback (2019, collects Vol. 3 #1–11; ISBN 978-1779500731)
- Powers: Book Seven trade paperback (2019, collects Bureau Vol. 1+2 #1–12; ISBN 978-1779500748)
- Powers: Script Book (reprints original scripts for Vol. 1 #1–11; ISBN 1-58240-233-7)

Dark Horse/Jinxworld reprints:

- Powers: The Best Ever trade paperback (2022, collects Vol. 4 #7-8 and Powers: the Best Ever; ISBN 978-1506730165)
- Powers Volume 1 trade paperback (2022, collects Vol. 1 #1–11 Powers Activity And Coloring Book; ISBN 978-1506730172)
- Powers Volume 2 trade paperback (2023, collects Vol. 1 #12–24, Annual 1; ISBN 978-1506730189)
- Powers Volume 3 trade paperback (2023, collects Vol. 1 #25-37; ISBN 978-1506730196)
- Powers Volume 4 trade paperback (2023, collects Vol. 2 #1-18; ISBN 978-1506730202)
- Powers Volume 5 trade paperback (2023, collects Vol. 2 #19-30; Annual 2008 ISBN 978-1506730219)
- Powers Volume 6 trade paperback (2024, collects Vol. 3 #1-11; ISBN 978-1506730226)
- Powers Volume 7 trade paperback (2024, collects Bureau Vol. 1+2 #1–12; ISBN 978-1506730233)
