= Elak, King of Atlantis =

Short story collection by Adrian Cole

- Cover of first edition
- Author: Adrian Cole
- Language: English
- Genre: Fantasy
- Publisher: Pulp Hero Press
- Publication date: 2020
- Publication place: United States
- Media type: print (paperback), ebook
- Pages: 246
- ISBN: 978-1-68390-260-7
- Preceded by: Elak, Warrior of Atlantis
- Followed by: Elak: Sea Hawks of Atlantis

Elak, King of Atlantis is a collection of sword and sorcery short stories by English author Adrian Cole, continuing the stories featuring the title character by American author Henry Kuttner. It was first published in trade paperback and ebook by Pulp Hero Press in July 2020; an ebook edition followed from the same publisher in October of the same year. The first British edition was issued in trade paperback by Parallel Universe Publications in July 2024.

== Summary ==
The book collects five of the author's "Elak" stories, two of them original to the collection, together with a foreword by Robert M. Price and a prologue by the author.

== Contents ==
- "Foreword: Before the Oceans Drank Atlantis" (Robert M. Price)
- "Prologue: Uneasy Lies the Head That Wears the Crown"
- "Blood of the Moon God" (from Strange Tales no. 10, Sep. 5, 2007)
- "Witch Queen of Doom Island" (from Worlds of the Unknown v. 1, Jan. 2015)
- "Revenge of the Sorcerer"
- "Spawn of the Sea God" (from The Mighty Warriors, May 2018)
- "Sky Warriors of Atlantis"

== Relation to other works ==
Cole's Elak tales are sequels to those of the original author, Henry Kuttner, collected as Elak of Atlantis. Other Elak stories by Cole are collected in Elak, Warrior of Atlantis (2024) and Elak: Sea Hawks of Atlantis (2025).
