= Kellory the Warlock =

1984 novel by Lin Carter

- dust cover of Kellory the Warlock
- Author: Lin Carter
- Cover artist: Steve Marchesi
- Language: English
- Series: The Chronicles of Kylix
- Genre: Sword and sorcery fantasy
- Publisher: Doubleday
- Publication date: 1984
- Publication place: United States
- Media type: Print (Hardcover)
- Pages: 180
- ISBN: 0-385-17315-6
- Preceded by: The Wizard of Zao

Kellory the Warlock is a fix-up fantasy novel by American writer Lin Carter, the third book of the Chronicles of Kylix series. Its seven episodic parts were originally written as short stories, but only one, "In the Valley of Silence," had been previously published (as "Vault of Silence," in the anthology Swords Against Tomorrow (1970)). The book was first published in hardcover by Doubleday in April 1984. It was reissued in hardcover and trade paperback by Wildside Press in October 2007, and in trade paperback and ebook by the same publisher in April 2016.

== Contents ==
- Part 1. Dark Palace of the Flame (7 chapters).
- Part 2. In the Valley of Silence (10 chapters).
- Part 3. The City Where Death was King (11 chapters).
- Part 4. Shadows in the Dark (6 chapters).
- Part 5. The Smile on the Face of the Beast (12 chapters).
- Part 6. Lord of the Shadows (8 chapters).
- Part 7. The Gray Enchanter (2 chapters).

== Plot ==
Each volume of the Chronicles of Kylix is set on a different world in the magical solar system of the fictional star Kylix in the constellation of the Unicorn. The system consists of the five planets Zao, Olymbris, Thoorana, Zephrondus and Gulzund. Kellory the Warlock takes place on Zephrondus.

Kellory is the last survivor of the Black Wolves tribe, descended from the Lost Kings of Illyriod. His people were massacred by the Thugoda Horde, who burned his father alive and held his own sword hand in the same fire so he could live to tell the tale but never raise a sword against his tormentors. He dedicates his life to revenge against the horde, becoming a warlock since he is no longer able to be a warrior. In time, he achieves his dark goal.

== Reviews ==
Jackie Cassada in Library Journal writes "[t]hough Kellory himself has a certain grim appeal, there is little in this unsubtle Conan-type adventure to recommend it to anyone other than hard-core sword-and-sorcery fans."
