= Swordsmen and Sorcerers' Guild of America =

Group of American fantasy authors

Flashing Swords! #1 (Dell Books, 1973), edited by Lin Carter – a showcase for the SAGA authors

The Swordsmen and Sorcerers' Guild of America or SAGA was an informal group of American fantasy authors active from the 1960s through the 1980s, noted for their contributions to the "Sword and Sorcery" kind of heroic fantasy, itself a subgenre of fantasy. When it developed a serious purpose that was to promote the popularity and respectability of Sword and Sorcery fiction.

== History ==
According to Lin Carter, the guiding force behind the group, SAGA was founded in the mid-1960s by the trio of himself, L. Sprague de Camp, and John Jakes out of a shared interest in the then-neglected subgenre of heroic fantasy. Originally it was little more than an in-group, with members gathering for drinks at science fiction conventions and bestowing pompous, complicated titles on each other. Carter was named "Purple Druid of the Gibbering Horde of the Slime Pits of Zugthakya," de Camp "Supreme Sadist of the Reptile Men of Yag," and Jakes "Ambassador-without-Portfolio to the Partly Squamous, Partly Rugose Vegetable Things of the South Polar City of Nugyubb-Glaa." They then considered who else merited membership, decided on Fritz Leiber, Jack Vance, and Michael Moorcock, who were, "in good time, informed of their unanimous election to our ranks." Later the six existing members agreed to elect Poul Anderson and Andre Norton. The group remained fairly informal, with few expectations of its members; Moorcock, who was styled "Veiled Thaumaturge of the Mauve Barbarians of Ningg," has noted he "wasn't really an active member."

SAGA later showcased the work of its members in the Flashing Swords! anthology series edited by Carter and published by Dell Books from 1973 to 1981. Per Carter, the idea was first floated at the World Science Fiction Convention in St. Louis in 1969, and the first two volumes were subsequently contracted by editor Gail Morrison of Dell Books.

Membership was increased to ten after the publication of the first two Flashing Swords! anthologies, when Avram Davidson and Katherine Kurtz were "voted unanimously" in.

Stories by SAGA members had also been featured in a few earlier sword and sorcery anthologies edited by L. Sprague de Camp for Pyramid Books and Putnam from 1963 to 1970, along with those of other, usually earlier fantasists. In The Spell of Seven (Pyramid Books, 1965), four of the seven pieces were by members. Another early anthology including works by members of the group was Swords Against Tomorrow (Signet Books, 1970), a paperback original edited by Robert Hoskins. It comprised one novella and three novelettes by SAGA members and a novelette by Leigh Brackett.

Carter and SAGA created and sponsored the Gandalf Awards administered by the annual World Science Fiction Convention according to the Hugo Award procedures. From 1974 to 1981 the Gandalf Grand Master Award was annually presented to one person for life achievement in high fantasy writing. (The first recognized J. R. R. Tolkien, deceased one year earlier, SAGA members won the next four, and the last three winners never became members.) The Gandalf Award for Book-Length Fantasy was conferred in 1978 and 1979 upon one book published during the previous calendar year. It was dropped by Worldcon because it partly duplicated the Hugo Award for Best Novel.

With the collapse of Carter's health in the 1980s the anthology series, the Gandalf award, and likely SAGA itself all went into abeyance. The anthology series (though not the organization) was revived under the editorship of Robert M. Price in 2020 to showcase the work of newer, lesser-known authors.

== Membership ==
Membership was extended by invitation to selected living heroic fantasy authors. Most early members were celebrated more for their science fiction writings than for fantasy, but SAGA membership depended solely on fantasy credentials. Known members and the works that formed the basis of their membership included:

- Poul Anderson (1926–2001) – novels The Broken Sword and Three Hearts and Three Lions
- Lin Carter (1930–1988) – "Thongor" series, inaugurated by The Wizard of Lemuria
- L. Sprague de Camp (1907–2000) – the Pusadian series and the revival and promotion (with Carter) of Robert E. Howard's creation Conan the Barbarian
- John Jakes (1932–2023) – "Brak the Barbarian" series
- Fritz Leiber (1910–1992) – Fafhrd and the Gray Mouser series
- Michael Moorcock (b. 1939) – Elric of Melniboné series
- Andre Norton (1912–2005) – Witch World series
- Jack Vance (1916–2013) – Dying Earth series
- Avram Davidson (1923–1993) – "Vergil Magus" series and numerous other works
- Katherine Kurtz (b. 1944) – "Deryni" series

In recognition of the expanding circle of authors exploring sword and sorcery fiction, the fifth Flashing Swords! anthology showcased works of fantasy authors who were not (or not yet) members of SAGA. These included:

- C. J. Cherryh (b. 1942) – "Morgaine" series
- Diane Duane (b. 1952) – novel The Door into Fire (subsequently the "Middle Kingdoms" series)
- Craig Shaw Gardner (b. 1949) – "Ebenezum" series
- Tanith Lee (1947–2015) – "Birthgrave" series
- Roger Zelazny (1937–1995) – "Dilvish" and "Amber" series

== Anthologies ==
The works of SAGA as a group, together with a few associated authors, were showcased in the following anthologies:

- The Spell of Seven, ed. L. Sprague de Camp (1965)
- Swords Against Tomorrow, ed. Robert Hoskins (1970)
- Flashing Swords!, ed. Lin Carter
1. Flashing Swords! #1 (1973)
2. Flashing Swords! #2 (1975)
3. Flashing Swords! #3: Warriors and Wizards (1976)
4. Flashing Swords! #4: Barbarians and Black Magicians (1977)
5. Flashing Swords! #5: Demons and Daggers (1981)

== See also ==
- Gandalf Award
