= Flashing Swords! 5: Demons and Daggers =

1981 anthology edited by Lin Carter

Flashing Swords! #5: Demons and Daggers
- First hardback edition.
- Editor: Lin Carter
- Cover artist: Ron Miller (hardcover); Richard Corben (paperback)
- Language: English
- Series: Flashing Swords!
- Genre: Fantasy
- Publisher: Nelson Doubleday
- Publication date: 1981
- Publication place: United States
- Media type: Print (Hardcover)
- Pages: viii, 184
- Preceded by: Flashing Swords! #4: Barbarians and Black Magicians
- Followed by: Lin Carter's Flashing Swords! #6

Flashing Swords! #5: Demons and Daggers is an American anthology of fantasy stories, edited by American writer Lin Carter. It was first published in hardcover by Nelson Doubleday in December 1981 as a selection in its Science Fiction Book Club, and in paperback by Dell Books simultaneously.

== Summary ==
The book collects five heroic fantasy novelettes by various fantasy writers, together with a general introduction and introductions to the individual stories by the editor. While previous volumes in the series had highlighted the work of members of the Swordsmen and Sorcerers' Guild of America (SAGA), in recognition of the expanding circle of authors exploring sword and sorcery fiction, this fifth anthology showcased works of fantasy authors who were not (or not yet) members of SAGA.

== Contents ==
- "Introduction: Where Magic Reigns" by Lin Carter
- "Tower of Ice" (Dilvish) by Roger Zelazny
- "A Thief in Korianth" by C. J. Cherryh
- "Parting Gifts" by Diane Duane
- "A Dealing with Demons" (Ebenezum) by Craig Shaw Gardner
- "The Dry Season" by Tanith Lee

== Awards ==
The book placed fifth in the 1982 Locus Poll Award for Best Anthology.

== Reception ==
The anthology was reviewed by Jeff Frane in Locus no. 253, February 1982, and Michael E. Stamm in Science Fiction & Fantasy Book Review no. 4, May 1982.
