= The Mighty Swordsmen =

Anthology edited by Hans Stefan Santesson

- Cover of The Mighty Swordsmen
- Author: edited by Hans Stefan Santesson
- Cover artist: Jim Steranko
- Language: English
- Genre: Fantasy
- Publisher: Lancer Books
- Publication date: 1970
- Publication place: United States
- Media type: Print (paperback)
- Pages: 256 pp.
- Preceded by: The Mighty Barbarians
- Followed by: The Mighty Warriors

The Mighty Swordsmen is a 1970 anthology of fantasy short stories in the sword and sorcery subgenre, edited by Hans Stefan Santesson. It was first published in paperback by Lancer Books in December 1970, and was a follow-up to the earlier Lancer anthology The Mighty Barbarians. Robert M. Price edited a later-day homage to both anthologies called The Mighty Warriors (2018).

== Summary ==
The book collects six sword and sorcery tales of authors and protagonists prominent in the genre, featuring Robert E. Howard's Conan, Lin Carter's Thongor, Michael Moorcock's Elric, John Brunner's Traveller in Black, and Roger Zelazny's Dilvish.

== Contents ==
- "Keeper of the Emerald Flame" (Thongor) (Lin Carter)
- "The Bells of Shoredan" (Dilvish) (Roger Zelazny)
- "Break the Door of Hell" (Traveller in Black) (John Brunner)
- "The People of the Summit" (Conan) (Björn Nyberg)
- "The Flame Bringers" (Elric) (Michael Moorcock)
- "Beyond the Black River" (Conan) (Robert E. Howard)

== Reception ==
The book was reviewed by L. Sprague de Camp in Amra v. 2, no. 54, April 1971, and Douglas Menville in Forgotten Fantasy no. 5, June 1971.

Menville noted the book was "[a] new anthology of sword-and-sorcery tales, featuring all the crowd favorites: Thongor, Conan, Elric, Lin Carter, Roger Zelazny, Robert E. Howard, Michael Moorcock, and a few others. Grand fun, with a fine cover by Jim Steranko, who must have painted it after seeing The Thief of Bagdad".
