= The Incorporated Knight =

1987 novel by L. Sprague de Camp and Catherine Crook de Camp

- Cover of the first edition.
- Author: L. Sprague de Camp and Catherine Crook de Camp
- Cover artist: Victoria Poyser
- Language: English
- Series: Neo-Napolitanian series
- Genre: Fantasy
- Publisher: Phantasia Press
- Publication date: 1987
- Publication place: United States
- Media type: Print (Hardback)
- Pages: 191
- ISBN: 0-932096-46-8
- OCLC: 16767167
- LC Class: PS3507.E2344 I5 1987
- Followed by: The Pixilated Peeress

The Incorporated Knight is a fix-up fantasy novel by American writers L. Sprague de Camp and Catherine Crook de Camp, the first book in their sequence of two Neo-Napolitanian novels. Chapters 1-5 first appeared as L. Sprague de Camp's short stories "Two Yards of Dragon", "The Coronet", "Spider Love" and "Eudoric's Unicorn" in Flashing Swords!, The Magazine of Fantasy and Science Fiction and The Year's Best Fantasy Stories in 1976–1977. The complete novel was first published in hardcover by Phantasia Press in August 1987, and in paperback by Baen Books in September 1988, with a trade paperback edition, also from Baen, following in 1991. An E-book edition was published by Gollancz's SF Gateway imprint on September 29, 2011, as part of a general release of de Camp's works in electronic form.

== Plot summary ==
Squire Eudoric Dambertson of Zurgau in the kingdom of Locania wishes to wed Lusina, the daughter of his former tutor, the magician Doctor Baldonius. The price is attaining the status of knight and supplying the magician with a portion of dragon hide for use in his magic. Dragons are locally scarce, so Eudoric and his trusty servant Jillo set out for Pathenia in the east to slay one. But once the two do manage to bring one down (by accident) they face legal complications for violating the local game laws. Returning, Eudoric finds his promised bride has run off with a minstrel, and his feudal lord Baron Emmerhard disinclined to knight him for his heroic exploit; he consoles himself by pursuing a scheme to establish a stagecoach line like those in Pathenia. (This material first appeared as the short story "Two Yards of Dragon".)

A subsequent rescue of Emmerhard from a magic spell finally secures him the knighthood, but he remains unlucky in love, as the baron's daughter Gerzilda also shuns his hand. (This material first appeared as the short story "The Coronet".)

Next Eudoric pursues Maragda, daughter of Rainmar, a local robber baron who has been raiding his coach line. Rainmar tasks him with slaying the giant spider Fraka, and once again matters go awry. While Eudoric's knightly reputation and stage line prosper, his marriage prospects remain nil. (This material first appeared as the short story "Spider Love".)

The pattern is repeated when he is commissioned to capture a unicorn for his ultimate overlord Emperor Thorar IX of the New Napolitanian Empire, intended as a gift for the visiting Grand Cham Gzik of Pantorozia. The emperor's daughter Petrilla, smitten with Gzik, weds the Cham instead. (This material first appeared as the short story "Eudoric's Unicorn".)

Seeking to extend his stage line into Letitia, capital of the kingdom of Franconia that borders the empire to the west, his reputation for getting things done leads to him being deputed to rescue King Clothar's sister Yolanda, held captive in the rude neighboring realm of Armoria. There he is forced to save her from a sea monster and then wed her, after which he flees back to Franconia with his new bride. He finds her a less than congenial mate — Yolanda is both a control freak and an enchantress. Fighting with each other and dangers along the way, they encounter the restless ghost of a king cursed to endure eternal boredom in his tomb, an orthodox ogre who kills and eats those of the wrong faith, and the soldiers of the hostile duchy of Dorelia.

Nor are Eudoric's difficulties left behind on their return to Letitia. Mewed up as a prisoner in all but name in his princess bride's mansion by her supernatural servants, he soon discovers she is a female Bluebeard who regularly collects husbands and petrifies them as she tires of them. By calling on the aid of Dr. Tsudai, a Serican sorcerer whose life he had saved during his earlier stay in Letitia, Eudoric is ultimately successful in freeing his three predecessor-husbands from statuehood and escaping their lethal spouse.

Safe back in Locania, where his nuptials are not recognized, Eudoric receives a message from Yolanda pleading for him to return, as he is the only one of her husbands whose loss she regrets. He prudently ignores her letter, choosing instead to resume his courtship of his original intended, Lusina — she is also back, having grown disillusioned with her unreliable lover. Meanwhile, he and Dr. Baldonius hatch plans to incorporate his coach line as a limited liability company after the fashion of the hongs of Serica.

== Setting ==
The Incorporated Knight and its sequel The Pixilated Peeress are both set in the medieval era of an alternate world sharing the geography of our own, but in which a "Napolitanian" (Neapolitan) empire filled the role of Rome and no universal religion like Christianity ever arose, leaving its nations split among competing pagan sects. The New Napolitanian Empire, of which Eudoric is a subject, roughly corresponds to our world's Holy Roman Empire, or Germany, while Franconia and Armoria, the lands he visits to the west, are the equivalents of France and Brittany, respectively. The geography of more eastern regions such as Pathenia and Pantorozia are borrowed in part from the fanciful regions portrayed in Mandeville's Travels; the time-period corresponds to the historical 14th century. In keeping with the character of de Camp's fantasy world as a cognate of our own, its place names tend to echo those of the real world. Examples include Franconia, equating to France but derived from the historic German region of the same name; Armoria, based on Armorica, an ancient name for Brittany; Serica, an ancient name for China or Xinjiang; Sogrambrium, the capital of the New Napolitanian Empire, derived from the Sicrambri or Sugambri, an ancient Germanic tribe located on the east bank of the Rhine near the present border of Germany and the Netherlands; and Letitia, the capital of Franconia, a variation on Lutetia, the ancient name of Paris.

== Reception ==
Reviews were favorable. Publishers Weekly, noting that "[t]he hallmark of Sprague de Camp's classic fantasy has been a wry humor as he asked commonsensical questions of the genre's imaginative but impractical motifs," called this book, "the adventures of ... a knight whose only goals are a wife and a decent living," "[m]inor de Camp but still most enjoyable," Jackie Cassada, writing for Library Journal, praised its "doughty and resourceful hero and ... generous dollop of the de Camps' boisterous humor." Roland Green, in The Booklist, called the book "a pleasant fantasy romp," noting that while it was "likely to be released in paperback in due time," its "high quality definitely makes [it] worth considering in hardcover."

The book was also reviewed by Trevin Matlock in Locus no. 320, September 1987, and Darrell Schweitzer in Aboriginal Science Fiction, November–December 1987.

== Relation to other works ==
The main plot device of bickering male and female protagonists not destined for a happy ending together is featured in several late de Camp novels, notably The Prisoner of Zhamanak (1982), The Bones of Zora (1983), and The Pixilated Peeress (1991).

Preceded by None	Neo-Napolitanian series The Incorporated Knight	Succeeded by The Pixilated Peeress
