= The Pixilated Peeress =

1991 novel by Lyon Sprague de Camp and Catherine Crook de Camp

- Cover of the first edition.
- Author: L. Sprague de Camp and Catherine Crook de Camp
- Cover artist: Romas Kukalis
- Language: English
- Series: Neo-Napolitanian series
- Genre: Fantasy
- Publisher: Del Rey Books
- Publication date: 1991
- Publication place: United States
- Media type: Print (Hardback)
- Pages: 208
- ISBN: 0-345-36732-4
- OCLC: 23287924
- Dewey Decimal: 813/.54 20
- LC Class: PS3507.E2344 P53 1991
- Preceded by: The Incorporated Knight

The Pixilated Peeress is a fantasy novel by American writers L. Sprague de Camp and Catherine Crook de Camp. It is the second book in their sequence of two Neo-Napolitanian novels, following The Incorporated Knight. It was first published in hardcover by Del Rey Books in August 1991, and in paperback by the same publisher in September 1992. An E-book edition was published by Gollancz's SF Gateway imprint on September 29, 2011 as part of a general release of de Camp's works in electronic form.

== Plot summary ==
Soldier and aspiring scholar Thorolf Zigramson of Rhaetia is out fishing when he encounters the proverbial damsel in distress in the form of Yvette, fugitive Countess of Grintz from the neighboring kingdom of Carinthia. She is fleeing the forces of the avaricious Duke of Landai, occupier of her fief and aspirant to her hand. But Thorolf gains a burden rather than gratitude by rescuing the self-important peeress from her pursuers.

To hide the countess from her enemy Thorolf takes her to the Rhaetian capital of Zurshnitt, where his enchanter friend Doctor Bardi undertakes to magically disguise her features. The spell goes badly awry, mistakenly turning Yvette into an octopus instead. In order to reverse the spell Thorolf must resort to the more powerful wizard Doctor Orlandus, a shady cult-leader. But matters go from bad to worse; while Orlandus cures Yvette all right, he also makes her one of his spirit-controlled slaves to advance his scheme of taking over the government of Rhaetia. On top of that, his henchmen murder Doctor Bardi, leaving Thorolf under suspicion of perpetrating the crime.

The soldier flees and seeks sanctuary with the trolls, some of whom he has befriended in the past, only to find them more inclined to eat than succor him; he has managed to put himself among the wrong trolls, arch-foes of the band he knows. To gain their favor and protection he promises to rid his captors of a local dragon. Accordingly, he directs them in a successful effort to capture the beast and sell it to the director of Zurshnitt's zoo. But to bind him to them, his new allies insist he marry one of their number. The troll lass finds the hapless warrior as unattractive as he does her, and they settle by mutual agreement into a union in name only.

Parlaying his membership in the troll band into a bid to reverse his fortune, Thorolf uses their secret tunnels to spy on Orlandus and ultimately to kill the wizard and rescue Yvette. The two are pursued by the late cultist's followers and trapped between them and the forces of Yvette's lordly suitor, which contend over who will get them. The situation resolved only after the duke kills the new cult leader in single combat and is then in turn bested and taken hostage by Thorolf. Meanwhile, the latter's troll wife complication is resolved when the beauty in question elopes with her true love, a stalwart troll lad.

Sharing a mutual attraction, Thorolf and Yvette have during their adventures alternately quarreled and reconciled, coming close at times to a physical relationship only to be thwarted by circumstances. With the downfall of the countess's enemies, all chance of this is lost; able to act the aristocrat again, Yvette throws herself with a will into raising an army to reconquer Grintz. Thorolf, as a commoner, has no place in this picture.

Bowing to the inevitable, Thorolf leaves and enlists as a mercenary in the wars between the contending city-states of Tyrrhennia. Finding a more amenable bride there, he eventually returns to Zurshnitt to find Yvette much reduced in circumstances. Her bid to regain her county has miscarried, and she has had to settle for becoming the wife of a commoner after all – Thorolf's old friend the zoo director. But Yvette chafes in the role. Now seeing her former rescuer in a different light, she proposes they abandon their spouses and run off together. Thorolf, satisfied with his new bride and finally close to achieving his longed-for academic position, declines.

== Setting ==
The Pixilated Peeress and its predecessor The Incorporated Knight are both set in the medieval era of an alternate world sharing the geography of our own, but in which a "Napolitanian" (Neapolitan) empire filled the role of Rome and no universal religion like Christianity ever arose, leaving its nations split among competing pagan sects. The present-day of the novels corresponds to the High Middle Ages, in which the preeminent power is the German-based Neo-Napolitanian Empire, an analog to the historical Holy Roman Empire. The Rhaetia of which Thorolf is a citizen roughly corresponds to our world's Switzerland, and neighboring Tyrrhenia to northern Italy. In keeping with the character of de Camp's fantasy world as a cognate of our own, its place names tend to echo those of the real world. There was an actual Rhaetia in the region de Camp places his that was a province of the Roman Empire and an actual Carinthia in Austria, while Tyrrhenia is an ancient name of Tuscany, and gave its name to the neighboring Tyrrhenian Sea. De Camp's Zurshnitt corresponds to Zürich, and his Landai may be intended to represent the actual Landau in southwestern Germany. His trolls are envisioned as remnant Neanderthals, currently inhabiting marginal high-altitude regions but represented as a formerly widespread aboriginal race displaced by humanity.

== Reception ==
Reviews were favorable. Sharon Miller, writing for United Press International, states that the book demonstrates de Camp "has come as close as anyone to perfecting" what she calls "light-hearted fantasy." Further, "[t]his being a proper fantasy, you know [the protagonists] are going to quarrel constantly and fall in love. But this also is the de Camps, so you'd be wise not to count on anything else except being thoroughly entertained."

Kirkus Reviews characterized the book as the authors' "latest lightweight sword-and-sorcery adventure," noting that "[t]here are no pretensions here: the de Camps deliver what they promise and no more--a lighthearted adventure laced with some outright comedy and a dash of bawdiness. Though the tale often follows the track of the cliché, the unassuming style and verve of the telling carry it through; and the authors veer from the expected course often enough to keep the pages turning. Pure prose junk-food, but a pleasant romp."

Publishers Weekly notes that "[w]ith its direct, matter-of-fact tone, this wry and delightful fantasy punctures the pretensions to which the genre is often prone."

In The Booklist Roland Green calls the book "good fun," and cites its hero as "a fine specimen of the de Camp hero, able to outthink as well as outfight his enemies." Sally Estes calls it "a lightweight but fun fantasy romp" and "a hilarious adventure with a surprise ending."

The book was also reviewed by Don D'Ammassa in Science Fiction Chronicle no. 142 August 1991, Carolyn Cushman in Locus no. 367, August 1991, Jean-Marc Lofficier in Starlog no. 173, December 1991, Baird Searles in Isaac Asimov's Science Fiction Magazine, March 1992, Darrell Schweitzer in Aboriginal Science Fiction, Fall 1992, and Steven Sawicki in Quantum, Summer/Fall 1992.

== Relation to other works ==
The main plot device of bickering male and female protagonists not destined for a happy ending together is featured in several late de Camp novels, notably The Prisoner of Zhamanak (1982), The Bones of Zora (1983), and The Incorporated Knight (1987). Thorolf's method of dragon hunting echoes that employed in "King Fusinian the Fox and the Teeth of Grimnor," an inset tale in de Camp's The Goblin Tower (1968). The plot feature of the protagonist gaining sanctuary with a nonhuman race, facing an unwelcome marriage, and being saved by the reluctant bride's betrothed is reused from de Camp's much earlier short story "The Blue Giraffe" (1939).

== See also ==
- L. Sprague de Camp bibliography

Preceded by The Incorporated Knight	Neo-Napolitanian series The Pixilated Peeress	Succeeded by None
