= A Place Among the Fallen =

1986 novel by Adrian Cole

A Place Among the Fallen is a novel by Adrian Cole published in 1986.

== Plot summary ==
A Place Among the Fallen is a novel in which a quest involves going to the heart of darkness.

== Reception ==
Dave Langford reviewed A Place Among the Fallen for White Dwarf #80, and stated that "Despite some indigestible chunks of background explanation and occasional rotten dialogue [...] it's a nicely convoluted yarn."

== Reviews ==
- Review by Chris Barker (1986) in Vector 134
