= Lin Carter's Flashing Swords! 8 =

2023 anthology edited by Robert Price

Lin Carter's Flashing Swords! #8
- Cover of first edition
- Editor: Robert M. Price
- Language: English
- Series: Flashing Swords!
- Genre: Fantasy
- Publisher: Cushing Publishing
- Publication date: 2023
- Publication place: United States
- Media type: Print (paperback)
- Pages: 190
- ISBN: 979-8988957584
- Preceded by: Lin Carter's Flashing Swords! #7

Lin Carter's Flashing Swords! #8 is an anthology of fantasy stories in the sword and sorcery subgenre, edited by Robert M. Price. It was first published in trade paperback and ebook by Cushing Publishing in December 2023.

== Summary ==
The book collects eleven stories by eight authors, together with an introduction by the editor; the Hinkle piece is a graphic novella. The stories feature sword and sorcery protagonists Thongor of Valkarth, Simon of Gitta, Duar the Accursed, Ki-Gor, White Lord of the Jungle, Kothar of the Magic Sword, Boscastle the Huguenot swordsman, Elak of Atlantis, Tara of the Twilight, Ansell of the Dreamlands, Varla of Valkarth, and Tonga of Lost Lemuria. The Hinkle piece is a graphic novella.

== Contents ==
- "Introduction: The Past Returns with a Vengeance" (Robert M. Price)
- "A Witch King is Born" (Michael A. Turton)
- "The Love of the Sea" (Lin Carter) (from Risque Stories no. 2, October 1984)
- "Thongor on Callisto" (Robert M. Price)
- "Manticora" (Glynn Owen Barrass)
- "Dark Continent" (Wayne Judge)
- "The Garden of Xylom Phom" (Glen M. Usher)
- "The Tomb of the Titan" (Robert M. Price)
- "Black Snow" (Pierre Comtois)
- "Demon's Lover" (Wayne Judge)
- "The City Without Name" (Glen M. Usher)
- "Gladiator Days" (Clayton Hinkle)
