= A Night in the Netherhells =

1987 novel by Craig Shaw Gardner

A Night in the Netherhells is a novel by Craig Shaw Gardner published by Ace Books in 1987.

== Plot summary ==
A Night in the Netherhells is the third book in the series involving the wizard Ebenezum, whose allergy to magic keeps him from being able to use magic.

== Reception ==
Lynn Bryant reviewed A Night in the Netherhells in Space Gamer/Fantasy Gamer No. 79. Bryant commented that "It is an amusing romp, in which it is demonstrated that the Netherhells isn't such a bad place to call home (if you're a demon), and that progress cheapens the good things in life. Good tongue in cheek fantasy."

== Reviews ==
- Review by Alan Fraser (1989) in Paperback Inferno, #78
- Review [German] by Manfred Zosel (1990) in Fantasia 55/56
