= Lin Carter's Flashing Swords! 7 =

2023 anthology edited by Robert Price

Lin Carter's Flashing Swords! #7
- Cover of first edition
- Editor: Robert M. Price
- Cover artist: Regis Moulon
- Language: English
- Series: Flashing Swords!
- Genre: Fantasy
- Publisher: Ramble House
- Publication date: 2023
- Publication place: United States
- Media type: Print (paperback), ebook
- Pages: 200
- ISBN: 9798399463155
- Preceded by: Lin Carter's Flashing Swords! #6
- Followed by: Lin Carter's Flashing Swords! #8

Lin Carter's Flashing Swords! #7 is an anthology of fantasy stories in the sword and sorcery subgenre, edited by Robert M. Price. It was first published in trade paperback and ebook by Ramble House in June 2023.

== Summary ==
The book collects eleven stories, ten original and one previously published, by nine authors, together with an introduction by Price; the Hinkle piece is a graphic novella.

== Contents ==
- "Introduction: Feasting in the Hall of Heroes" (Robert M. Price)
- "For the Blood is the Life" (Lin Carter) (from Risque Stories no. 1, March 1984)
- "Kothar and the Goddess in Amber" (Wayne Judge)
- "Exiles from Valhalla" (Robert M. Price)
- "Prey of the Sorcerer" (Charles Garofalo)
- "A Tyranny in Poseidonis" (PIerre Comtois)
- "The Priory of the Black Templars" (Glen M. Usher)
- "The Cult of the Castrators" (Robert M. Price)
- "The Valley of Krothero" (Glen M. Usher)
- "Dawn of the Iconoclasts" (Glynn Owen Barrass)
- "The Pirate, The Monster, and The Sea" (Clayton Hinkle)
- "In the Company of Battered Women" (Mike Jansen)
