= The Changing Land =

1981 fantasy novel by Roger Zelazny

- Cover of first edition (paperback)
- Author: Roger Zelazny
- Cover artist: Michael Herring
- Language: English
- Genre: Fantasy
- Publisher: Del Rey
- Publication date: 1981
- Publication place: United States
- Media type: Print (hardback & paperback)
- Pages: 245
- ISBN: 0-345-25389-2
- OCLC: 7338977
- Preceded by: Dilvish, the Damned

The Changing Land is a fantasy novel by American writer Roger Zelazny, first published in 1981. The novel resolves the storyline from the various Dilvish short stories (collected in 1982 as the book Dilvish, the Damned). It was nominated for the Locus Award. Elements of the story intentionally reflect the work of H. P. Lovecraft, Frank Belknap Long, and William Hope Hodgson, including the Hounds of Tindalos (here called the "Hounds of Thandalos"), The House on the Borderland, and the Old Gods.

== Plot summary ==
The novel picks up several months after the events in the last chapter of Dilvish, the Damned. The Castle Timeless, one of several fortresses belonging to Dilvish's arch-enemy, Jelerak, is currently inhabited by the "mad" Old One Tualua. Tualua is undergoing one of the "changes" common to his kind, which cause him periodic fits of insanity. These fits cause the land surrounding the castle to be subject to all sorts of chaotic, unpredictable, and often-deadly effects. A number of wizards, hoping to tap into Tualua's vast power, attempt to pass through this maelstrom and reach the castle. Watching events from the outside are members of the Society of Magic, who are containing the spread of chaos.

Dilvish, determined to avenge himself against Jelerak, appears and attempts to breach the magical barriers, hoping to find his arch-enemy inside. Accompanied by his companion Black, a demon-like being in the shape of a black metal horse, they rescue a wizard, Weleand, from being drowned in an acid pit. Soon after, they meet a young Elven sorceress, Arlata, frozen by a magical wind. Weleand unfreezes her by transferring the condition to Black, and escapes. Dilvish is then captured by the caretaker of the castle, Baran of the Extra Hand, and thrown into the dungeon with several other captured wizards.

Escaping the dungeon, Dilvish wanders the castle, eventually finding Semirama, a Queen from long ago resurrected by Jelerak because she can speak Tualua's ancient language. Semirama has built a rapport with Tualua, and has convinced the demi-god to disrupt the lands around the castle with even more chaos than his periodic madness would cause. This is part of Baran's plan to usurp Jelerak's power, the disruption being one of the things preventing outsiders reaching the castle. Baran has also placed magical guards on other entry points, such as a mirror that can act as a portal.

Black manages to sneak into the castle in his human form, and encounters Jelerak, who was disguised as Weleand, about to sacrifice an unconscious Arlata as a means to gain control of Tualua. Meanwhile, the escaped wizards manage to disable the maintaining spell which keeps the castle anchored in normal time, causing everyone in the castle to become temporarily unconscious. The entire castle and its inhabitants are rapidly accelerated into the far future, so far that they reach the end of time. Here they encounter the Elder Gods, who appear as gargantuan beings the height of the stars, gambling with dice, apparently for the right to control the outcome of the contest beneath them.

Baran is killed by one of the wizards, and both Jelerak and Tualua are claimed by the Elder Gods, the former as their prisoner and the latter as one of their own. Semirama, whose resurrection was canceled by the Elder Gods' capture of Jelerak, instead collapses into dust, her soul now inhabiting the alternate universe of mirrors in the castle, where she meets up with an ancestor of Dilvish's, Selar.

The Elder Gods re-attach Castle Timeless to the flow of time, and it passes through the beginning of the universe, where the magicians have to do battle with the "Hounds of Thandalos". The fortress eventually comes to rest at its original point in history.

Dilvish is initially enraged by the denial of his desire for vengeance, but then realizes that Jelerak will receive justice at the hands of the Gods, whom Jelerak has openly defied. Dilvish decides to go back to his homeland with Arlata, who is the granddaughter of one of Dilvish's former loves in that land.

With the help of a Society member, the survivors escape through the mirror portal.

== Characters ==
- Dilvish, the main protagonist, is of mixed Elvish and human parentage. He is on a quest to kill the wizard Jelerak, who consigned him to Hell. He is not a magician as such, but he does know all the "Awful Sayings", which are tremendously powerful black magic spells. Using one of these spells is like setting off a nuclear weapon, so will only use them as a last resort. He knows enough magic to help the other imprisoned magicians in the fortress to maintain a "demon trap" in their cell, protecting them from the demons who roam the fortress and occasionally help themselves to a snack from among the prisoners. He also wears "elf boots" which allow him to maintain his footing on any surface.
- Black, the demon horse on which Dilvish rides. Black is made entirely of metal and can breathe fire from his nostrils. He is intelligent and speaks to Dilvish as they negotiate the land around the fortress. Under some circumstance, he can become a burly bearded man in a kilt.
- Baran of the Extra Hand is a wizard who has taken control of the fortress and is using the demi-god Tualua to keep outsiders at bay until he can figure out a way to control Tualua without using Semirama, the resurrected Elf queen. Baran has control of a magic giant hand that appears from a magical plane to attack his enemies. After Baran is killed, the hand appears and carries him back to its home.
- Semirama is a beautiful Elvish queen who once loved an ancestor of Dilvish. Tualua will respond to her voice only. She has been dead for centuries, but was resurrected by Jelerak to control Tualua.
- Tualua is a vile demi-god, apparently a mass of tentacles, who lives in a pit full of fecal matter inside the fortress.
- Melbriniononsadsazzersteldregandishfeltselior is a demon, consisting of mismatched body parts such as pieces of amphibians and arthropods, who roams the castle but can be commanded by Baran and Semirama. His name was an attempt by his parents to make him proof against summoning by wizards, since the wizard must be able to pronounce the name properly in order to make the summoning and control the demon. Unfortunately, Baran's native language is agglutinative, so the name presents no problems for him. Black encounters his fellow demon while in human form and kills him, much to the demon's surprise.
- Arlata is an Elvish quester trapped in the changing land around the fortress. She is the granddaughter and look-alike of Dilvish's long-ago sweetheart Fevera. Freed by Weleand, who is really Jelerak, she is later captured by him to be used as a sacrifice to help him control Tualua.
- Jelerak is a powerful black magician temporarily reduced in power by attacks from some of his former followers, who returns to his fortress to regain power by controlling Tualua, the demi-god.
- Holrun is a young, ambitious member of the ruling Council of Magicians, who has resigned in protest at the handling of the Castle Timeless matter. In fact, he has done this for show and to give himself a free hand, hoping to exploit the situation for his own ends. He locates a spell protecting the Castle from intrusion by magical means, using a form of remote viewing. Using his skills, he inserts his own spell within the protecting spell, which allows him to form his own gateway into the Castle. At the conclusion, Dilvish and Arlata use this gateway to escape.
