= Swords Against Tomorrow =

1970 anthology edited by Robert Hoskins

- Cover art from the first edition
- Editor: Robert Hoskins
- Language: English
- Genre: Fantasy
- Publisher: Signet Books
- Publication date: 1970
- Publication place: United States
- Media type: Print (Hardcover)
- Pages: 176 pp

Swords Against Tomorrow is an anthology of fantasy stories, edited by Robert Hoskins. It was first published in paperback by Signet Books in August 1970.

== Summary ==
The book collects five sword and sorcery or sword and planet short stories and novelettes by various authors, together with an introduction and introductory notes to the individual stories by the editor.

All of the authors represented except Leigh Brackett were members of the Swordsmen and Sorcerers' Guild of America (SAGA), a somewhat informal literary group of fantasy authors active from the 1960s to the 1980s, making the book a precursor of the five Flashing Swords! anthologies of SAGA-member works edited by Lin Carter from 1973 to 1981.

== Contents ==
- "Introduction" (Robert Hoskins)
- "Demon Journey" (Poul Anderson) (from Planet Stories v. 4, no. 10, January 1951)
- "Bazaar of the Bizarre" (Fafhrd and the Gray Mouser) (Fritz Leiber) (from Fantastic Stories of the Imagination v. 12, no. 8, August 1963)
- "Vault of Silence" (Kellory the Warlock) (Lin Carter) (first publication)
- "Devils in the Walls" (Brak the Barbarian) (John Jakes) (from Fantastic Stories of the Imagination v. 12, no. 5, May 1963)
- "Citadel of Lost Ships" (Leigh Brackett) (from Planet Stories v. 2, no. 2, March 1943)
