= The People of the Summit =

- Short story by Björn Nyberg and L. Sprague de Camp
- Country: United States
- Language: English
- Genre: Fantasy

Publication
- Published in: The Mighty Swordsmen
- Publication type: Collection
- Publisher: Lancer Books
- Media type: Print (Paperback)
- Publication date: 1970
- Series: Conan the Barbarian

"The People of the Summit" is a short story by Swedish writer Björn Nyberg, subsequently revised by L. Sprague de Camp, featuring the fictional sword and sorcery hero Conan the Barbarian created by Robert E. Howard. Nyberg's version of the story was first published by Lancer Books in the paperback anthology The Mighty Swordsmen in December 1970. The revised version was first published by Bantam Books in the paperback collection Conan the Swordsman in August 1978.

== Plot ==
Conan and his comrade, Jamal, are the sole survivors in a cavalry of Turanian soldiers ambushed by Khozgarian tribesmen. Fleeing the massacre, they encounter Shanya Karaz, daughter of a Khozgari chief, whom they seize as a hostage. Their journey brings the three across Bhamlar Pass, which they brave despite Shanya's warnings about the People of the Summit, remnants of a dying race who haunt the high mountains. Lost in the pass, all three are attacked simultaneously. Jamal is killed, while Shanya is captured during the struggle. After escaping a troop of grey-haired apes, Conan pursue the creatures towards an ancient tower in his quest to rescue Shanya.

== Sources ==
- Laughlin, Charlotte; Daniel J. H. Levack (1983). De Camp: An L. Sprague de Camp Bibliography. San Francisco: Underwood/Miller. p. 223.
- The People of the Summit (original version) title listing at the Internet Speculative Fiction Database
- The People of the Summit (revised version) title listing at the Internet Speculative Fiction Database

Preceded by Conan the Hero	Complete Conan Saga (William Galen Gray chronology)	Succeeded by "The Curse of the Monolith"
