= Pulp Hero Press =

American publishing company

- Founded: 2017
- Founder: Bob McLain
- Country of origin: United States

Pulp Hero Press is a small publisher active since 2017. The press was founded by Bob McLain. It is primarily a paperback and ebook publisher, initially specializing in non-fiction relating to Robert E. Howard and sword and sorcery before branching into fantasy and pulp adventure fiction. It publishes works by both contemporary authors and classic genre writers of the past.

Authors published by Pulp Hero Press include Robert Adams, Fred Blosser, Joe Bonadonna, Jason Ray Carney, Adrian Cole, Ashley Jude Collie, John Jakes, Brian Murphy, David C. Smith, and Roy Thomas.

== Bibliography of books published (partial) ==
- Savage Scrolls, Volume One: Scholarship from the Hyborian Age, nonfiction by Fred Blosser, Jun. 2017.
- Pulp Slam: Rip-Roarin’ Tales of Mystery, Murder, and Mayhem, collection by Fred Blosser, Aug. 2017.
- Ar-I-E'ch and the Spell of Cthulhu: An Informal Guide to Robert E. Howard's Lovecraftian Fiction, nonfiction by Fred Blosser, May 2018.
- Western Weirdness and Voodoo Vengeance: An Informal Guide to Robert E. Howard's American Horrors, nonfiction by Fred Blosser, May 2018.
- Robert E. Howard: A Literary Biography, nonfiction by David C. Smith, Sep. 2018.
- Barbarian Life: A Literary Biography of Conan the Barbarian, Volume One, nonfiction by Roy Thomas, Dec. 2018.
- Rejex, novel by Ashley Jude Collie, Apr. 2019.
- Dark Muse, novel by David C. Smith, May 2019.
- Silken Swords: An Informal Guide to the Women in the Fiction of Robert E. Howard, nonfiction by Fred Blosser, May 2019.
- Nick Nightmare Investigates, collection by Adrian Cole, Oct. 2019.
- The Forgotten Horrors Omnibus: Volume One: 1929-1942, nonfiction by Michael H. Price and George E. Turner, Oct. 2019.
- Barbarian Life: A Literary Biography of Conan the Barbarian, Volume Two, nonfiction by Roy Thomas, Nov. 2019.
- Bright Star, novel by David C. Smith, Dec. 2019.
- The Daring Decade, Volume One, 1970-1974: The Exciting, Influential, and Bodaciously Fun American Movies of the 1970s, nonfiction by Chris Strodder, Dec. 2019.
- The Weird Tales of Dorgo the Dowser, novel by Joe Bonadonna, Dec. 2019.
- Flame and Crimson: A History of Sword-and-Sorcery, nonfiction by Brian Murphy, Jan. 2020.
- Tales of Attluma, collection by David C. Smith, Apr. 2020.
- Dorgo the Dowser and the Order of the Serpent, novel by Joe Bonadonna, Jun. 2020.
- Rakefire and Other Stories, collection by Jason Ray Carney, Jul. 2020.
- Elak, King of Atlantis, collection by Adrian Cole, Jul. 2020.
- Lin Carter's Flashing Swords! #6, anthology edited by Robert M. Price, Jul. 2020 (withdrawn).
- The Coming of the Horseclans, novel by Robert Adams, Jul. 2020.
- Waters of Darkness, novel by Joe Bonadonna and David C. Smith, Oct. 2020.
- The Annotated Guide to Robert E. Howard's Weird Fantasy, nonfiction by Fred Blosser, Oct. 2020.
- Nightmare Cocktails: Further investigations from the Files of Nick Nightmare, collection by Adrian Cole, Oct. 2020.
- The Daring Decade, Volume Two, 1975-1979: The Exciting, Influential, and Bodaciously Fun American Movies of the 1970s, nonfiction by Chris Strodder, Nov. 2020.
- Savage Scrolls, Volume One: Thrilling Tales of Sword-and-Sorcery, anthology edited by Jason Ray Carney, Nov. 2020.
- Swords of the Horseclans, novel by Robert Adams, Nov. 2020.
- Brak the Barbarian, collection by John Jakes, Dec. 2020.
- Sometime Lofty Towers, novel by David C. Smith, Jan. 2021.
- The Heroes of Echo Gate, novel by Joe Bonadonna, Feb. 2021.
- Rebellion, novel by Adrian Cole, Mar. 2021.
- Barbarian Life: A Literary Biography of Conan the Barbarian, Volume Three, nonfiction by Roy Thomas, Apr. 2021.
- The Weird Tales Story: Expanded and Enhanced, nonfiction by Robert Weinberg, Apr. 2021.
- GOTHAM CITY SOUNDS: The Music of Batman Villains, nonfiction by Matthew Hodge, Nov. 2021.
- Robert E. Howard: A Literary Biography, nonfiction by David C. Smith, Jul. 2025.
- Arcane Arts and Cold Steel: Writing Sword-and-Sorcery Fiction, nonfiction by David C. Smith, Dec. 2025.

== General references ==
- ISFDB entry for Pulp Hero Press
