= Craig Shaw Gardner =

American fantasy writer

- Born: July 2, 1949 (age 77)
- Occupation: Writer
- Writing career
- Genre: Fantasy
- Website: craigshawgardner.com

Craig Shaw Gardner (born July 2, 1949) is an American author, best known for producing fantasy parodies similar to those of Terry Pratchett.

He was also a member of the Swordsmen and Sorcerers' Guild of America (SAGA), a loose-knit group of Heroic Fantasy authors founded in the 1960s, some of whose works were anthologized in Lin Carter's Flashing Swords! anthologies.

== Bibliography ==
=== Series ===
==== Ebenezum ====
1. A Malady of Magicks. New York: Ace Fantasy Books. 1986. ISBN 978-0-441-51661-2.
2. A Multitude of Monsters. New York: Ace Fantasy Books. 1986. ISBN 978-0-441-54523-0.
3. A Night in the Netherhells. New York: Ace Fantasy Books. 1987. ISBN 978-0-441-02314-1.

The Exploits of Ebenezum, omnibus (1987)

==== Wuntvor ====
1. A Difficulty with Dwarves. New York: Ace Books. 1987. ISBN 978-0-441-14779-3.
2. An Excess of Enchantments. New York: Ace Books. 1988. ISBN 978-0-441-22363-3.
3. A Disagreement with Death. New York: Berkley Pub. Group. 1989. ISBN 978-0-441-14924-7.

The Wanderings of Wuntvor, omnibus (1989)

==== The Cineverse Cycle ====
1. Slaves of the Volcano God. New York: Ace Books. 1989. ISBN 978-0-441-76977-3.
2. Bride of the Slime Monster. New York: Ace Books. 1990. ISBN 978-0-441-07950-6.
3. Revenge of the Fluffy Bunnies. New York: Ace Books. 1990. ISBN 978-0-441-71833-7.

The Cineverse Cycle (1990), a.k.a. The Cineverse Cycle Omnibus (1992)

==== The Sinbad series ====
1. The Other Sinbad. New York: Ace Books. 1991. OCLC 228442978.
2. A Bad Day for Ali Baba. New York: Ace Books. 1992. ISBN 978-0-441-04676-8.
3. Scheherazade's Night Out. New York: Ace Books. 1992. ISBN 978-0-441-47054-9; a.k.a. The Last Arabian Night (1993).

==== Dragon Circle ====
1. Dragon Sleeping. New York: Ace Books. 1994. ISBN 978-0-441-00260-3; a.k.a. Raven Walking.
2. Dragon Waking. New York: Ace Books. 1996. ISBN 978-0-441-00373-0.
3. Dragon Burning. New York: Ace Books. 1997. ISBN 978-0-441-00478-2.

==== The Changeling War ====
Written as Peter Garrison

1. The Changeling War. New York: Ace Books. 1999. ISBN 978-0-441-00552-9.
2. The Sorcerer's Gun. New York: Ace Books. 1999. ISBN 978-0-441-00648-9.
3. The Magic Dead. New York: Ace Books. 2000. ISBN 978-0-441-00683-0.

==== Abbadon Inn ====
Written as Chris Blaine

- Twisted Branch. New York: Berkley Books. 2005. ISBN 978-0-425-20524-2.
- Dark Whispers. New York: Berkley Books. 2005. ISBN 978-0-425-20629-4.
- Drowned Night. New York: Berkley Books. 2005. ISBN 978-0-425-20676-8.

==== Temporary Magic Series ====
1. Temporary Monsters. Hertford, NC: Crossroad Press. 2016. ISBN 978-1-941408-92-6.
2. Temporary Hauntings. Hertford, NC: Crossroad Press. 2016. ISBN 978-1-946025-16-6.

=== Collections ===
- The Little Purple Book of Peculiar Stories. Grantham, New Hampshire: Borderlands Press. 2004. ISBN 978-1-880325-45-2.
- A Cold Wind in July. Lexington, KY: Neconebooks. 2011. ISBN 978-1-4664-6742-2.

=== Novelizations ===
- The Lost Boys (1987)
- Wishbringer (1988)
- Batman (1989)
- Back to the Future (1990)
- Back to the Future Part II (1989)
- Back to the Future Part III (1990)
- Batman Returns with Sam Hamm and Daniel Waters (1992)
- The 7th Guest with Matthew J. Costello (1995)
- Leprechauns (1999)
- Jason and the Argonauts (written in 2000 but not published)

=== Non-film novels based on licensed properties ===
- The Batman Murders. New York: Warner Books, Inc. 1990. ISBN 978-0-446-36040-1.
- Spider-Man: Wanted Dead or Alive. New York: Byron Preiss Multimedia Co. : G.P. Putnam's Sons. 1998. ISBN 978-0-399-14385-4.
- Return to Chaos. London: Pocket. 1998. ISBN 978-0-671-02136-8.
- Dark Mirror. New York: Simon & Schuster. 2004. ISBN 978-0-689-86701-9.
- Battlestar Galactica: The Cylons' Secret. New York: Tor. 2006. ISBN 978-0-7653-1578-6.
