= The Traveller in Black =

1971 collection of fantasy short stories by John Brunner

- First edition cover art, by Leo and Diane Dillon
- Author: John Brunner
- Language: English
- Genre: Fantasy
- Publisher: Ace Books
- Publication date: 1971 (first edition)
- Publication place: United States
- Media type: Print (hardcover, paperback)
- Pages: 175 (first edition)
- ISBN: 0-441-82211-8

The Traveller in Black is a 1971 collection of fantasy short stories, written by John Brunner and dealing with the Traveller of the title. The first edition had four stories ("Imprint of Chaos", "Break the Door of Hell", "The Wager Lost by Winning", and "The Dread Empire") and was issued in 1971 in the Ace Science Fiction Specials line. A subsequent 1986 edition contained an additional story, "The Things That Are Gods", and was titled The Compleat Traveler in Black.

The series deals with an unnamed protagonist, who "has many names but only one nature" and who bears a staff of curdled light, traveling through a landscape in which Order and Chaos conflict. With this, and with the powers vested in him by "the One for whom all things are neither possible nor impossible", he can counter Chaos. However, he must do so in answer to the spoken wishes of the people around him, always with consequences they had not intended and often to their detriment. For example, the Traveller hears the wish of a skilled assassin that he could get the fame to which his expertise should entitle him. Are not all great artists admired and respected? Is he not the cunningest hand with dagger, garotte, and subtle poison? The Traveller replies, as usual, "As you wish, so be it." The following morning, the Traveller finds the assassin's body on a dunghill: his crimes have been discovered and properly attributed to him, and he has received the execution the law prescribes.

Among the Traveller's powers is the ability to bind and free elementals, which in these tales are varied and more than five in number. The Traveller's ultimate purpose is to reduce the power of Chaos, and thus the utility of magic, until everything should have a single nature. As he works, person after person, city after city, move from Chaos into the realm of Order, and thus from Eternity into Time.

== Stories ==
- "Imprint of Chaos", first published in Science Fantasy, issue 42 (1960), in which the enchanter Manuus is manifest, and then is not. The city Acromel suffers under the rule of its Quadruple God; the city Ryovora finds that it can do better with common sense than with gods
- "Break the Door of Hell", first published in Impulse, issue 2 (1966), in which the fools of the city of Ys (led by Lord Vengis) learn from where their folly originated.
- "The Wager Lost by Winning", first published in Fantastic, April 1970, in which the gamesters of Teq learn both meanings of "hazard", and ale is drunk.
- "Dread Empire", first published in Fantastic, April 1971, in which the Four Great Ones are summoned and depart, and mighty nobles and humble peasants each get their wishes.
- "The Things That Are Gods" (not in the original Ace edition, included in Compleat), first published in Asimov's SF Adventure Magazine (Fall 1979), in which Lake Taxhling suffers a sea-change.

== Reception ==
Colin Greenland reviewed The Traveller in Black for Imagine magazine and stated that "the chronicle of the softly-spoken little pilgrim with the staff of curdled light, whose task it is to end the rule of Chaos and usher in the age of Order. Wry, thoughtful fantasy in the vein of Lord Dunsany and Jack Vance."

Dave Langford reviewed The Compleat Traveller in Black for White Dwarf #90 and found it "very readable and re-readable".
