= Hans Stefan Santesson =

American novelist

- Born: July 8, 1914; Paris, France
- Died: February 18, 1975 (aged 60); Edgewater, New Jersey, U.S.
- Occupations: Editor; writer; reviewer
- Writing career
- Genres: Science fiction, crime fiction, fantasy

Hans Stefan Santesson (July 8, 1914, Paris – February 18, 1975, Edgewater, New Jersey) was an American editor, writer, and reviewer.

== Career ==
He edited the selections of the Unicorn Mystery Book Club in the latter 1940s and early 1950s, the magazines Fantastic Universe from 1956 to 1960, the US edition of the British New Worlds Science Fiction in 1960 and the US version of The Saint Mystery Magazine from 1959 to 1967, and went on to edit several science fiction and fantasy anthologies, including:

- The Fantastic Universe Omnibus (1960)
- Rulers of Men (1965)
- Gods for Tomorrow (1967)
- Flying Saucers in Fact and Fiction (1968)
- Crime Prevention in the 30th Century (1969)
- The Mighty Barbarians: Great Sword and Sorcery Heroes (1969)
- Gentle Invaders (1969)
- The Mighty Swordsmen (1970)
- The Days After Tomorrow (1971)

President and chairman of the board, of the Society for the Study of the Unexplained.
