= Stephen Marchesi =

American artist (born 1951)

- Born: Stephen Marchesi; December 30, 1951; Astoria, New York
- Known for: Illustration

Stephen Marchesi (born December 30, 1951) is an artist who lives in San Diego, California. He has created illustrations for textbooks, magazines, and children's books.

Marchesi was born in Astoria, New York. As a child, Marchesi drew his own comics. While a student at High School of Art and Design, he worked for Warren Publications. In 1973, he graduated from Pratt Institute. Afterward he spent half a year working as an assistant art director for an ad agency, and then began his career as a freelance illustrator. Marchesi cited his primary influences as being the cover illustrations and interior artwork created by Newell Convers Wyeth for novels published by Charles Scribner's Sons, and movie posters of the 1950s and 1960s.

In 1978, Marchesi was hired by Random House to create new cover art for 12 of the paperback editions of its Three Investigators series. Of the nearly 500 book covers that Marchesi has illustrated, he said that he had more freedom while doing these 12 than for any others that he has ever done. These covers were also the last time that he used watercolor - he later switched to acrylic and oil.

Marchesi lives with his companion, Mercy Baron and their kitties Thelma and Louise.
