= Comic Shop News =

Weekly newspaper distributed by comic book specialty stores

- Editor: David Witting
- Former editors: Cliff Biggers and Ward Batty
- Categories: Comic book news
- Frequency: Weekly
- Publisher: CSN Press, LLC.
- Founded: 1987; 39 years ago
- Country: United States
- Language: English
- Website: www.comicshopnews.com

Comic Shop News (also called CSN) is a weekly newspaper distributed by comic book specialty stores. It was launched in 1987 by Cliff Biggers and Ward Batty, and it has been published weekly for over 35 years. In late 2022, Comic Shop News was sold to CSN Press LLC, and it continues to be published weekly.

== History ==
In 1982, Biggers and Batty became co-owners of a Marietta, Georgia, comic shop, Dr. No's, for which Biggers began writing a newsletter, The Doctor Knows. Realizing there was a market for an upbeat, product-focused store newsletter, they started Comic Shop News. At the time, DC, Marvel and other publishers were selling their own newsletters in bundles to comic shops. Using that distribution technique, CSN is sold in bundles to comic shops who distribute free to customers as a sales tool and to reward weekly visits.

CSN grew to become the largest-circulation weekly in the comic book industry, and it still continues as a weekly publication with over 1,800 issues published to date and over 130 million copies sold. CSN is available in over 400 comic shops worldwide, but mostly in North America. CSN was originally four black-and-white pages but expanded to eight pages and full color.

While CSN is primarily a news source, some original comics content has also been featured. In addition to Batman, Teenage Mutant Ninja Turtles and the Spider-Man newspaper strips, Brian Michael Bendis and artist Michael Avon Oeming long-running comic, Powers, was initially previewed in a series of original strips. The eight strips were colored and lettered by Bendis (before initial colorist/letterer Pat Garrahy became involved) and complemented the upcoming series as a companion piece in newspaper strip form. The strips were collected in the Powers: The Definitive Hardcover Collection vol. 1.

A mock version of Comic Shop News was featured in the opening credits of the film Chasing Amy.

In December 2022, with issue #1847, Comic Shop News was sold to CSN Press, and it is now edited by David Witting. The logo and layout design were refreshed, and the editorial coverage has expanded to cover all the different products that can be found in modern comic book stores. Comic Shop News remains a weekly print publication.

== See also ==
- Direct market
