= The Mighty Barbarians =

Anthology edited by Hans Stefan Santesson

- Cover of The Mighty Barbarians
- Author: edited by Hans Stefan Santesson
- Cover artist: Jim Steranko
- Language: English
- Genre: Fantasy
- Publisher: Lancer Books
- Publication date: 1969
- Publication place: United States
- Media type: Print (paperback)
- Pages: 221 pp.
- Followed by: The Mighty Swordsmen

The Mighty Barbarians: Great Sword and Sorcery Heroes is a 1969 anthology of fantasy short stories in the sword and sorcery subgenre, edited by Hans Stefan Santesson. It was first published in paperback by Lancer Books in 1969, and was later followed up by the subsequent Lancer anthology The Mighty Swordsmen. It has been translated into Dutch. Robert M. Price edited a later-day homage to both anthologies called The Mighty Warriors (2018).

== Summary ==
The book collects five sword and sorcery tales of authors and protagonists prominent in the genre, featuring Robert E. Howard's Conan, Henry Kuttner's Elak, Lin Carter's Thongor, L. Sprague de Camp's Suar Peial, and Fritz Leiber's Fafhrd and the Gray Mouser.

== Contents ==
- "Introduction" (Hans Stefan Santesson)
- "When the Sea-King's Away" (Fafhrd and the Gray Mouser) (Fritz Leiber)
- "The Stronger Spell" (Suar Peial) (L. Sprague de Camp)
- "Dragon Moon" (Elak) (Henry Kuttner)
- "Thieves of Zangabal" (Thongor) (Lin Carter)
- "A Witch Shall be Born" (Conan) (Robert E. Howard)

== Reception ==
The book was reviewed by Fred Patten in Science Fiction Review no. 38, 1970.
