= Gandalf Award =

Award honoring achievement in fantasy literature

The Gandalf Awards, honoring achievement in fantasy literature, were conferred by the World Science Fiction Society annually from 1974 to 1981. They were named after Gandalf the wizard, from the Middle-earth stories by J. R. R. Tolkien. The award was created and sponsored by Lin Carter and the Swordsmen and Sorcerers' Guild of America (SAGA), an association of fantasy writers. Recipients were selected by vote of participants in the World Science Fiction Conventions according to procedures of the Hugo Awards.

The award was given for life achievement, and corresponds roughly to the World Fantasy Award for Life Achievement, which was started the year after the Gandalf. In 1978 and 1979, an award was also given for a novel published during the preceding year.

With the collapse of Carter's health in the 1980s the Gandalf award went into abeyance.

== Gandalf Grand Master Award ==
The Gandalf Grand Master Award for life achievement in fantasy writing was awarded every year from 1974 to 1981. The inaugural winner was J. R. R. Tolkien, recently deceased in 1973.

- 1974: J. R. R. Tolkien
- 1975: Fritz Leiber
- 1976: L. Sprague de Camp
- 1977: Andre Norton
- 1978: Poul Anderson
- 1979: Ursula K. Le Guin
- 1980: Ray Bradbury
- 1981: C. L. Moore

There was no ballot in 1981. All other winners since Tolkien were among the five or six finalists one year earlier. Others who appeared on the ballot were C. S. Lewis, Jack Vance, Roger Zelazny, Marion Zimmer Bradley, Anne McCaffrey, and Patricia McKillip.

== Gandalf Award for Book-Length Fantasy ==
The Gandalf Award for Book-Length Fantasy was awarded only in 1978 and 1979.

- 1978: The Silmarillion, J. R. R. Tolkien, edited by Christopher Tolkien
- 1979: The White Dragon, Anne McCaffrey

== See also ==
- Swordsmen and Sorcerers' Guild of America
- World Fantasy Award
