= James Enge =

American novelist

James M. Pfundstein
- Education: University of Minnesota (PhD)
- Occupations: Lecturer, author
- Children: 2
- Relatives: Patrick Pfundstein
- Writing career
- Pen name: James Enge
- Language: English
- Period: 2005–present
- Genres: fantasy, sword and sorcery
- Notable work: Morlock the Maker series.
- Website: jamesenge.com

James Enge is the pseudonym of James M. Pfundstein, an American fantasy author. His best known work is the ongoing Morlock the Maker series. His first novel in the series, Blood of Ambrose, was nominated for the World Fantasy Award in 2010. His newest series, A Tournament of Shadows, tells the origin story of his famous character Morlock Ambrosius.

== Biography ==
Pfundstein has a PhD from the University of Minnesota and is a teaching professor at Bowling Green State University in the World Languages and Cultures Department. He is represented by the Onyxhawke Agency.

== Bibliography ==
=== Novels ===
==== Morlock the Maker ====
- Blood of Ambrose (2009), ISBN 978-1-59102-736-2
- This Crooked Way (2009), ISBN 978-1-59102-784-3
- The Wolf Age (2010), ISBN 978-1-61614-243-8

==== A Tournament of Shadows ====
- A Guile of Dragons (2012), ISBN 978-1-61614-628-3
- Wrath-Bearing Tree (2013), ISBN 978-1-61614-781-5
- The Wide World's End (2015), ISBN 978-1-61614-907-9

=== Morlock the Maker short fiction ===
- Turn Up This Crooked Way (2005)
- "A Covenant With Death"
- "The Red Worm's Way"
- "Payment Deferred" (2005)
- "A Book Of Silences" (2007)
- The Lawless Hours (2007)
- "The Gordian Stone" (2008)
- Payment In Full
- "Fire and Sleet" (2009)
- "Traveller's Rest" (2010)
- "Laws for the Blood" (2020)

=== This Crooked Way ===
- The War Is Over
- "Interlude: Telling the Tale"
- "Blood From A Stone"
- "Payment Deferred"
- "Fire and Water"
- An Old Lady and a Lake
- Interlude: Book of Witness
- The Lawless Hours
- Payment in Full
- Destroyer
- Whisper Street
- Interlude: The Anointing
- Traveller's Dream
- Where Nurgnatz Dwells
- Interlude: How the Story Ends
- Spears of Winter Rain
- Calendar and Astronomy
- Sources and Backgrounds for Arthurian Legends

==== Note ====
An episodic novel.

=== Other stories ===
- "Brother Solson and Sister Luna" (2008)

=== Academic ===
- Per astra ad aspera: Aeneid 6.725. In Vergilius. v. 43; 1997. [n.p.] Vergilian Society. p. 22-30.
- Review of S. Byrne, E.P. Cueva, Veritatis Amicitiaeque Causa: Essays in Honor of Anna Lydia Motto and John R. Clark in the Bryn Mawr Classical Review
- Doctoral Dissertation : Not Only the City: Cosmography in the Tragedies of Seneca (2000)
- Λαμπροὺϛ Δυνάσταϛ: Aeschylus, Astronomy and the Agamemnon The Classical Journal, Vol. 98, No. 4 (Apr. - May, 2003), pp. 397-410
- Phaedra on the Tiles: Seneca Phaedra 1154ff (2004)
- Libretto Translation of Gli amori d'Apollo e di Dafne (2005)
- Libretto Translation of La Virtu de’ Strali d'Amore (2007)
