= Elak of Atlantis =

Short story collection by Henry Kuttner

- Cover of first edition
- Author: Henry Kuttner
- Cover artist: Brad W. Foster
- Language: English
- Genre: Fantasy
- Publisher: Gryphon Books
- Publication date: 1985
- Publication place: United States
- Media type: print (paperback), ebook
- Pages: 210
- Followed by: Elak, Warrior of Atlantis

Elak of Atlantis is a collection of sword and sorcery short stories by American author Henry Kuttner (1915–1958), gathering together all his tales featuring the title character. It was first published in trade paperback by Gryphon Books in March 1985; a later trade paperback edition was issued by Paizo Publishing in October 2007. The first British and first ebook edition was issued by Gateway/Orion in March 2013; the first American ebook edition was issued by Diversion Books in July 2014. The collection has been translated into Italian.

== Summary ==
Map of Atlantis by Jack Gaughan.

The book collects the author's four "Elak" stories, together with supplementary material that differs according to the edition. All editions include a map of Kuttner's version of Atlantis deriving from an original by Jack Gaughan that first appeared in the anthology The Fantastic Swordsmen (1967). The Gryphon Books edition included a general introduction and individual introductions to each story by editor Gary Lovisi, the latter consisting of linking material collectively titled "A Portable Outline of Elak's Career." Also included were illustrations by Brad W. Foster. The Paizo and Gateway/Orion editions dropped the Lovisi and Foster material in favor of an introductory essay by Joe R. Lansdale and supplemented the Elak stories with the two tales of Kuttner's other Sword and Sorcery hero, Prince Raynor. The Diversion Books edition consisted of the four Elak stories alone, omitting all supplementary material except the map.

== Contents ==
- "Henry Kuttner and Elak: An Introduction" (Gary Lovisi) (Gryphon edition only)
- "Kuttner Sharpens His Literary Sword" (Joe R. Lansdale) (Paizo and Gateway/Orion editions only)
- "A Portable Outline of Elak's Career" [pt. 1] (Gary Lovisi) (Gryphon edition only)
- "Atlantis" (map)
- "Thunder in the Dawn" (from Weird Tales v. 31, nos. 5–6, May–June 1938) (Henry Kuttner)
- "A Portable Outline of Elak's Career" [pt. 2] (Gary Lovisi) (Gryphon edition only)
- "The Spawn of Dagon" (from Weird Tales v. 32, no. 1, July 1938) (Henry Kuttner)
- "A Portable Outline of Elak's Career" [pt. 3] (Gary Lovisi) (Gryphon edition only)
- "Beyond the Phoenix" (from Weird Tales v. 32, no. 4, Oct. 1938) (Henry Kuttner)
- "A Portable Outline of Elak's Career" [pt. 4] (Gary Lovisi) (Gryphon edition only)
- "Dragon Moon" (from Weird Tales v. 35, no. 7, Jan. 1941) (Henry Kuttner)
- "Cursed Be the City" (Prince Raynor) (from Strange Stories v. 1, no. 2, April 1939) (Henry Kuttner) (Paizo and Gateway/Orion editions only)
- "The Citadel of Darkness" (Prince Raynor) from Strange Stories v. 2, no. 1, Aug. 1939) (Henry Kuttner) (Paizo and Gateway/Orion editions only)

== Reception ==
The collection was reviewed by Robert M. Price in Crypt of Cthulhu no. 33, Lammas 1985, Richard A. Lupoff in Locus no. 567, April 2008, and Howard Andrew Jones in Black Gate, Summer 2008.

== Relation to other works ==
Author Adrian Cole has continued Kuttner's Elak saga in his own series of short stories, most of which appear in his collections Elak, Warrior of Atlantis (2024), Elak, King of Atlantis (2020), and Elak, Sea Hawks of Atlantis (2025).
