= David C. Smith (author) =

American writer (born 1952)

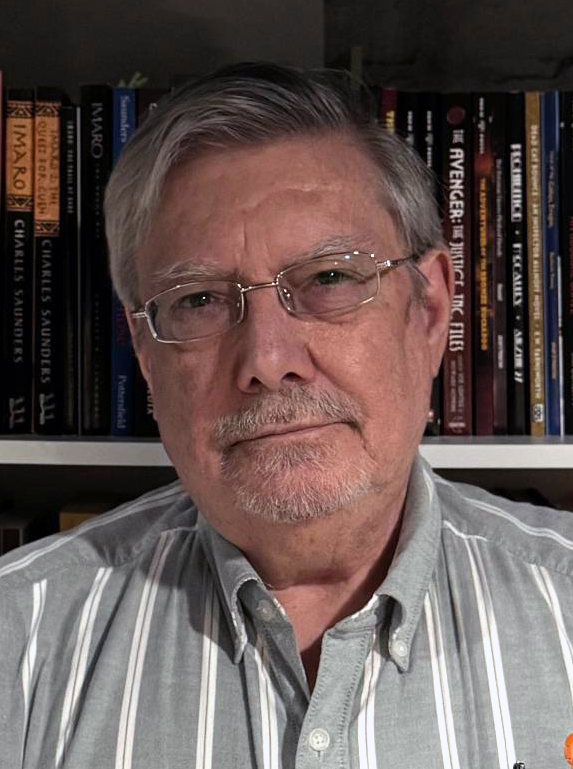
- Born: David Claude Smith Jr. August 10, 1952 (age 74); Youngstown, Ohio, U.S.
- Education: Youngstown State University
- Occupations: Author; editor; essayist
- Writing career
- Period: 1971-Present
- Genres: Fantasy, sword and sorcery, horror, historical
- Notable works: Attluman cycle, The Fall of The First World, Bright Star
- Website: www.davidcsmith.net

David Claude Smith Jr. (born August 10, 1952) is an American author of fantasy, horror, historical, and suspense fiction, medical editor, and essayist. He writes as David C. Smith. He is best known for his heroic fantasy novels, including his collaborations with Richard L. Tierney featuring characters created by Robert E. Howard, notably six novels featuring Red Sonja.

== Life and family ==
Smith was born in Youngstown, Ohio, to David C. Smith (Sr.) and Clara M. (Steib) Smith. He has a younger brother, Thomas (Tom), and younger sister, Jane (Smith) Whan. Since 1996, Smith has lived in Palatine, Illinois, with his wife, Janine, and their daughter.

== Career ==
Smith has written or co-written 26 novels, 2 short story collections, and numerous other short stories. Aside from writing fiction, he has worked as an advertising copyeditor and English teacher and for more than 20 years as a scholarly medical editor. He has served on the staff of Neurology, was the editorial production manager of the American Journal of Ophthalmology, and for more than ten years has been the managing editor of the Journal of the American Academy of Orthoppaedic Surgeons.

Smith's collaborations with Tierney and some of his short fiction have been issued in German, and Oron has been translated into and reprinted in Czech.

== Works ==
=== Novels ===
==== Oron and the Tales of Attluma ====
Oron is a barbaric warrior whom Smith introduces in the novel Oron (1978). Oron and its prequels—Reign, Sorcery! (published as Mosutha's Magic, 1982), Deathwolf (published as The Valley of Ogrum, 1982), and Death in Asakad and Other Stories (published as The Ghost Army, 1983)—as well as the novel The Shadow of Sorcery (published as The Sorcerer's Shadow, 1978) and 32 short stories, novelettes, and novellas (1971 to present) are set on the imaginary ancient island-continent Attluma. All five books are being reprinted by Wildside Press, beginning with Oron in2023.

Most of the Attluma short fiction appeared originally in fanzines and small-press publications during the 1970s and early 1980s. The novella "Engor's Sword Arm" inspired the song "Sword Arm" by the Russian heavy metal band Blacksword.

Tales of Attluma (Pulp Hero Press, 2020) features 16 tales set in different periods of Attluma's history. In addition to these stories, “Shadow-Born, Shadow-Taken” appears in the e-book anthology Artifacts and Relics (2012), “The Shadow of Dia-Sust” appears in the anthology Mighty Warriors (2018), “Twin Scars” appears in the anthology Warlords, Warlocks & Witches (2019), “Born of the Serpent” appears in the anthology Savage Scrolls 1 (2020), “Shadow of the Serpent” appears in Terra Incognita: Lost Worlds of Fantasy and Adventure (2022), “Old Moon over Irukad” appears in New Edge Sword and Sorcery 0 (September 2022), “Sessa’s Song” appears in Weirdbook 46 (2023), “Atonement for a Resurrected God” appears in New Edge Sword and Sorcery 2 (2023), “The Iron Law” appears in Weirdbook 47 (2024), and “The Undead of Sul-Atet” appears in the anthology Neither Beg nor Yield (2024).

The novel Sometime Lofty Towers (Pulp Hero Press, 2020; reprinted by Brackenbury Press, 2025) has been called “the literary artistic height that contemporary sword and sorcery can aspire to.”

A 'tour guide' for all the Attluma stories published up to March 2021 is hosted by BlackGate.com to help readers understand the internal timeline of the tales versus their varying publication dates (Aug 2020, edited in 2021 to include Sometime Lofty Towers).

==== Red Sonja and the Robert E. Howard pastiches ====
Smith and Richard L. Tierney co-wrote six novels featuring the Hyrkanian warrior Red Sonja. The character, loosely based on Howard's Red Sonya, had been previously adapted by Roy Thomas into stories for the Marvel line of Conan and Red Sonja comic magazines. The novels, all published by Ace Books, are The Ring of Ikribu (1981), Demon Night (1982), When Hell Laughs (1982), Endithor's Daughter (1982), Against the Prince of Hell (1983), and Star of Doom (1983). A new omnibus edition of the Red Sonja novels is forthcoming in 2027.

Smith also wrote the novel The Witch of the Indies (1977), featuring the pirate Black Terence Vulmea, and co-wrote with Tierney For the Witch of the Mists (1978), featuring the Pictish warrior Bran Mak Morn. Both characters were created by Howard.

==== Other Fiction ====
The Fall of the First World comprises The West Is Dying (published as The Master of Evil ), Sorrowing Vengeance, and The Passing of the Gods. All were published by Pinnacle Books in 1983. The trilogy has been reprinted by Wildside Press.

David Trevisan, a young sorcerer, appears in two novels, The Fair Rules of Evil (Avon Books, 1989) and The Eyes of Night (Avon Books, 1991).

The folk-horror novel Seasons of the Moon, published by iUniverse in October 2005, is a literary coming-of-age novel featuring a rural matriarchal society.

Other novels include Call of Shadows (2009, Airship 27), dealing with modern sorcery; Dark Muse (2012, Damnation Press, reprinted 2019 by Pulp Hero Press), a thriller about a serial killer; and Waters of Darkness (with Joe Bonadonna; 2013, Damnation Press, reprinted 2020 by Pulp Hero Press, now privately published). The historical fiction novel Bright Star, set in Chicago during the era of silent movies, was published by Pulp Hero Press in 2019. Coven House, about ghost hunters trapped in a haunted house, was published by Pulp Hero Press in 2021.

=== Nonfiction ===
Arcane Arts and Cold Steel: Writing Sword-and-Sorcery Fiction, a survey of contemporary sword-and-sorcery fiction emphasizing the genre's literary qualities, was published in 2025 by Pulp Hero Press.

In 2019, Smith was awarded the 2018 Atlantean Award for Outstanding Achievement, Book, by the Robert E. Howard Foundation for Robert E. Howard: A Literary Biography (Pulp Hero Press, 2018, ISBN 978-1-68390-097-9). His Guest of Honor acceptance speech, given at a Howard Days ceremony in Cross Plains, Texas, in June 2019, titled “Robert E. Howard: A Literary Reckoning,” is available on YouTube (video by Ben Friberg) and appears in The Dark Man: The Journal of Robert E. Howard Literary Studies Vol. 10, No. 2, December 2019.

Articles written by Smith include "The Writer’s Style: Sound and Syntax in Howard’s Sentences" in The Dark Man: The Journal of Robert E. Howard Studies Vol. 5, No. 2, February 2013; "At the Crossroads: Swords, Sorcery, and Heavy Metal", in Metal & Fantasy, Vol. 1, Frantz-E. Petiteau, ed. (Rosiéres-en-Haye, France: Camion Blanc, 2014) [tr]; and "Introduction," in Swords of Steel, Dave Ritzlin, ed. (Chicago, Illinois: DMR Books, 2015).

Understanding English: How Sentences Work is a post-secondary English grammar textbook/workbook written by Smith and published by South-Western/ITC in 1991. His essays include "Fantasy in the Silent Cinema" and "A Critical Appreciation of John Milius's Conan the Barbarian".
