= Dilvish, the Damned =

1982 fantasy collection by Roger Zelazny

- Cover of first edition (paperback)
- Author: Roger Zelazny
- Illustrator: Michael Herring
- Language: English
- Genre: Fantasy
- Publisher: Del Rey
- Publication date: 1982
- Publication place: United States
- Media type: Print (hardback & paperback)
- Pages: 215
- ISBN: 0-345-30625-2
- OCLC: 9036859
- Followed by: The Changing Land

Dilvish, the Damned is a collection of fantasy stories by American writer Roger Zelazny, first published in 1982. Its contents were originally published as a series of separate short stories in various fantasy magazines. Prior to publication, Zelazny's working title for the book was Nine Black Doves. The working title was later re-used for the fifth volume of The Collected Short Stories of Roger Zelazny collection, as a tribute to Dilvish. The storyline begun in this collection was resolved in the novel The Changing Land, which was published before the other Dilvish stories appeared in book form.

== Plot summary ==
Dilvish is the descendant of both elves and humans, a scion of a prominent Elven house and "the Human House that hath been stricken" which lost its peerage for mixing Elven and Human blood. Hundreds of years before the main story, he comes across a dark ritual being performed by the sorcerer Jelerak who is sacrificing a human girl. He attempts to stop the ritual but is turned into stone, with his soul banished to Hell. His body becomes a statue, and for many decades it resides within the square of a nearby town that he had formerly saved from enemy conquerors. When this town is again in need of a hero, their citizens' plight allows Dilvish the passage he needs to escape from Hell. He returns to the world of the living with his steed, the metal demon horse Black, and a burning desire for revenge against Jelerak, but must first repulse the assault against the endangered town. Dilvish then goes to call upon the Shoredan - a cursed people bound to his family. He searches for Jelerak in the Tower of Ice and finds the sorcerer's apprentice and his sister trapped there. The two of them believe him to be a servant of Jelerak, sent to kill them.

== Contents ==
The original short story sequence comprising Dilvish, the Damned was originally published as follows:

- "Passage to Dilfar" (Fantastic Stories of Imagination, February 1965)
- "Thelinde's Song" (Fantastic Stories of Imagination, June 1965)
- "The Bells of Shoredan" (Fantastic, March 1966)
- "A Knight for Merytha" (Eternity SF v. 1, no. 3, 1974)
- "The Places of Aache" (Other Worlds 2, January 1980)
- "A City Divided" (first published in this collection, 1982)
- "The White Beast" (Whispers 13-14, October 1979)
- "Tower of Ice" (Flashing Swords! #5: Demons and Daggers, December 1981)
- "Devil and the Dancer" (first published in this collection, 1982)
- "Garden of Blood" (Sorcerer's Apprentice #3, Summer 1979)
- "Dilvish, the Damned" (first published in this collection, 1982)

== Awards ==
Dilvish, the Damned was nominated for a 1982 Locus Award.
