= Cliff Biggers =

American comic book writer and journalist

Cliff Biggers is an American comic book writer and journalist. His first published writing appeared in fanzines in the mid-1960s. He was a founding member of the amateur press alliance (APA) Myriad and was active in the Southern Fandom Press Alliance, a southeastern-based science fiction amateur press association. He was also involved in Galaxy, CAPA-Alpha, Apa-5, and other amateur press alliances.

== Career ==
Biggers' first professional writing was done for Jim Steranko's Mediascene magazine in 1972; he worked intermittently for Steranko for two years. At the same time, he and his wife Susan H. Biggers co-edited and published the science fiction review magazine Future Retrospective. He and Susan Biggers received the 1977 Rebel Award for outstanding Southern science fiction fan achievement for their work with Future Retrospective.

Biggers was a founding member of the Atlanta Science Fiction Club (ASFiC) in 1977. He wrote and edited Atarantes, the ASFiC publication, until 1982, when he cut back his involvement in Atlanta science fiction.

In 1982, Biggers became a co-owner of a comic shop, Dr. No's, for which he began writing a newsletter, The Doctor Knows. That newsletter grew into Comic Shop News, a publication he co-launched with Ward Batty in the spring of 1987. CSN grew to become the largest-circulation weekly in the comic book industry, and still continues as a weekly publication. Biggers also wrote dozens of articles for Krause Publications' Comics Buyer's Guide in the 1980s and 1990s, and acted as their primary price guide adviser for many of those years. Biggers also created and wrote the comic book After Apocalypse, which featured the first published artwork of Mark Bagley (who would later go on to illustrate The Amazing Spider-Man and Ultimate Spider-Man) and Dave Johnson.

In the 1990s, he co-wrote Earth Boys with Brett Brooks; the series was illustrated by co-creator Dave Johnson. The recurring comic book story was featured in several issues of Dark Horse Comics' Dark Horse Presents. He and Brett Brooks also co-wrote the final three issues of I-Bots, the Tekno Comics series based on a concept by Isaac Asimov. In those issues, they introduced the Corp-Bots, a group of characters who were scheduled to appear in their own adventures until Tekno abruptly ceased publishing.

Biggers remains the primary writer for Comic Shop News and is a frequent contributor (with a featured column appearing at least monthly) to the Newsarama website.
