= Adrian Cole (writer) =

British writer

- Born: Adrian Christopher Synnot Cole; 22 July 1949 (age 75); Plymouth, England
- Occupation: writer
- Genre: fantasy
- Relatives: Frederick Cole (father), Ruth Cole (mother)

Website
- www.adriancscole.com

Adrian Christopher Synnot Cole (born 22 July 1949 in Plymouth, England), is a British writer. He is known for his Dream Lords trilogy, the Omaran Saga and Star Requiem series, and his young adult novels, Moorstones and The Sleep of Giants.

== Biography ==
Adrian Cole was born in 1949 in Plymouth, Devon. Cole's father was in the Army, and Adrian spent three years with his family in Malaya when he was a young child, before settling back in Devon. He became interested in fantasy and science fiction at an early age, through Tarzan of the Apes, King Solomon's Mines, movies such as Earth versus the Flying Saucers and comics such as the original Classics Illustrated War of the Worlds, as well as the works of Algernon Blackwood, Lovecraft, and Dennis Wheatley.

He first read The Lord of the Rings in the late 1960s while working in a public library in Birmingham, and was inspired by the book to write an epic entitled "The Barbarians," which was eventually revised into The Dream Lords trilogy, published by Zebra Books in the early 1970s. He began writing various ghost, horror, and fantasy tales, which he sold to various anthologies and magazines, and he had 4 novels published in England by Robert Hale. The novel Madness Emerging had a distinctly Lovecraftian flavour, set in a small Cornish village (based on one in which he had lived for 5 years) overrun by an alien force. He then had two "young adults" fantasy novels published in England, Moorstones and The Sleep of Giants, the first one set on Dartmoor, the second in the South West. A number of fantasy series followed, including The Omaran Saga and Star Requiem, as well as the novelizations of his stories about the Voidal, a S&S character and his elemental sidekick, Elfloq the Familiar. He edited a collection of Lin Carter's short stories about Thongor of Lemuria and the book, Young Thongor. His novel Night of the Heroes envisions various superheroes forming an unlikely union to battle an evil genius.

He has had short stories published in The Year's Best Fantasy Stories (DAW Books) and Year's Best Fantasy and Horror, and he was once nominated for the former Balrog Award. His story "Dark Destroyer" was included in the anthology Swords Against the Millennium. His first shared-world novel was The Crimson Talisman, which is set in the realm of Eberron.

Cole has worked as a librarian, an administrator in education, and Director of Resources in a large secondary college in the town of Bideford, North Devon, where he lives with his wife Judy, son Sam, and daughter Katia in an old blacksmith's forge.

== Bibliography ==
=== Dream Lords ===
1. A Plague of Nightmares (1975)
2. Lord of Nightmares (1975)
3. Bane of Nightmares (1976)
- "In the Land of Hungary Shadows" (2018)

=== Omaran Saga ===
1. A Place Among the Fallen (1986)
2. Throne of Fools (1987)
3. The King of Light and Shadows (1988)
4. The Gods in Anger (1988)

=== Star Requiem ===
1. Mother of Storms (1989)
2. Thief of Dreams (1989)
3. Warlord of Heaven (1990)
4. Labyrinth of Worlds (1990)

=== The Voidal ===
- "All Things Dark and Evil (1978)
- "The Ocean of Souls (1979)
- "Thief of Thieves (1979)
- "The Universe of Islands (1980)
- "The Exile of Earthendale (1985)
- "The Weaver of Wars (1988)
1. Oblivion Hand (2001)
2. The Long Reach Of Night (2011)
3. The Sword Of Shadows (2011)

=== Elak of Atlantis ===
- "Blood of the Moon God" (2007)
- "Witch Queen of Doom Island" (2015)
- "Spawn of the Sea God" (2018)
- "Revenge of the Sorcerer" (2020)
- "Sky Warriors of Atlantis" (2020)
- Elak, King of Atlantis (collection, 2020)
- "The Tower in the Crimson Mist" (2020)

=== Nick Nightmare ===
- "Please Allow Me to Introduce Myself"
- "You Don't Want to Know" (2013)
- "The Vogue Prince" (2012)
- "Mayhem on Mad Gull Island"
- "Kiss the Day Goodbye"
- "What Dread Hands and What Dread Feet?"
- "Fire All of the Guns at One Time"
- "Hot Little Number from Hell"
- "This One Will Kill You"
- Nick Nightmare Investigates (collection, 2014)
- "Don't Say I Didn't Warn You" (2016)

=== Other novels ===
- Madness Emerging (1976)
- Paths in Darkness (1977)
- The LUCIFER Experiment (1981)
- Wargods of Ludorbis (1981)
- Moorstones (1982)
- The Sleep of Giants (1983)
- Blood Red Angel (1993)
- The Hand of the Voidal (1984)
- Storm Over Atlantis (2001)
- The Crimson Talisman (2005)
- Night of the Heroes (2011)
- The Shadow Academy (2014)

=== Chapbooks ===
- Bodoman of Sor (1977; as "Norma N. Johns")
- Longbore the Inexhaustible (1978)

=== Other collections ===
- Tough Guys (2016)

=== Other short fiction ===
- "Wired Tales" (1973)
- "The Horror Under Penmire" (1974)
- "The Genuine Article" (1974)
- "The Kiss of Asgard" (1975)
- "City of Gargoyles" (1976)
- "The Sleeping God" (1976)
- "The Coming of the Voidal" (1977)
- "Bodoman of Sor" (1977) [only as by Norma N. Johns]
- "The Demon in the Stone" (1977)
- "Scars" (1977)
- "The Moon Web" (1978)
- "Longbore the Inexhaustible" (1978)
- "'The Lurking Shadow on the Threshold of the Shunned House's Doorstep (The Big Heap)" by Ray Manhandler'" (1978)
- "Transmuto, the Metamorphic Myrmidon" (1978)
- "Offside" (1979)
- "First Make Them Mad" (1979)
- "Astral Stray" (1979)
- "At the Council of Gossipers" (1980)
- "Krobar the Unbelievable" (1980)
- "Midnight Hag" (1980)
- "Snow Demons" (1983)
- "Face to Face" (1990)
- "Only Human" (1991)
- "Revenge of the Heavy Metal Vampires" (1991)
- "Heart of the Beast" (1994)
- "The Crossing" (1994)
- "The Frankenstein Legacy" (1994)
- "Treason in Zagadar" (1994)
- "The Shadow Navigator" (1995)
- "The War Among the Gods (Part 13 of 17)" (1997)
- "Dark Destroyer" (2000)
- "The Castle of Glass" (2000)
- "Demon's Eye View" (2001)
- "A Ship of Monstrous Fortune" (2003)
- "The War Among the Gods" (2008)
- "The Sound of Distant Gunfire" (2012)
- "The Chaos Blade" (2012)
- "The Shadow Academy" (excerpt) (2014)
- "Running With the Tide" (2015)
- "Demon Driver" (2015)
- "Late Shift" (2015)
- "Give Me the Daggers" (2015)
- "A Girl and Her Dolls" (2015)
- "The Door into Envy" (2016)
- "Train to Nowhere" (2016)
- "In Blackwalk Wood" (2016)
- "A Smell of Burning" (2016)
- "If You Don't Eat Your Meat" (2016)
- "Not If You Want to Live" (2016)
- "Wait for the Ricochet" (2016)
- "The Sealed City" (2016)
- "Slayers at the Gate" (2017)
- "The Third Movement" (2017)
- "A Kiss for the Mirrorman" (2017)
- "A Killing in Karkesh" (2017)
- "A Beast by Any Other Name" (2017)
- "The Pullulations of the Tribe" (2017)
- "Tear Down the Stars" (2017)
- "No Holds Bard" (2017)
- "Iconoclasm" (2018)
- "An Unfamiliar Familiar" (2018)
- "The Summoning of a Genie in Error" (2018)
- "You'd Do It for Diamonds" (2018)
- "Up the Lazy River" (2018)
- "The Next Time It Rains" (2018)
- "No Other God But Me" (2018)
- "Queen of the Hunt" (2018)
- "Broken Billy" (2018)
- "Enter the Cobweb Queen" (2019)
- "Tonight I Wear My Crimson Face" (2019)
- "Cold Storage" (2019)
- "Return of the Dark Brotherhood" (2020)
- "Revenge of the Sorceror" (2020)
