= Thongor =

Character in novels and stories by Lin Carter

Thongor is a character in a series of sword-and-sorcery novels and stories written by Lin Carter, stylized after Conan the Barbarian and set in ancient Lemuria. The character was picked up by Marvel Comics in the 1970s for its series Creatures on the Loose which saw some of Carter's stories adapted, as well as the author himself contributing to later issues.

== Bibliography ==
- The Wizard of Lemuria (1965) – later revised and expanded as Thongor and the Wizard of Lemuria (1969)
- Thongor of Lemuria (1966) – later released as Thongor and the Dragon City (1970)
- Thongor Against the Gods (1967)
- Thongor in the City of Magicians (1968)
- Thongor at the End of Time (1968)
- Thongor Fights the Pirates of Tarakus (1970)
- Young Thongor (2012) – consisting of stories by Lin Carter, Robert M. Price and Adrian Cole
- The Sword of Thongor (2016) – consisting of stories by Robert M. Price, some based on material by Carter
- How Thongor Conquered Zaremm – short story by Robert M. Price. Published in Lin Carter's Simrana Cycle (2018)
- Thongor in the Valley of Demons – short story by Robert M. Price. Published in The Mighty Warriors (2018)
- Thongor Conquers the Underground World by Robert M. Price & Lin Carter (2023) [novel based on unused outline by Carter]

== Adaptations ==
promotional artwork for Thongor in the Valley of Demons

=== Film ===
In 1975, a Thongor film was planned with a $3 million budget. Titled Thongor in the Valley of Demons the film was intended to be the first major release for producer Milton Subotsky's company Sword and Sorcery productions following his departure from Amicus Productions. Subotsky intended Thongor in the Valley of Demons to be the first in a series of films with Subotsky having already written treatments for two follow-ups, Thongor in the City of Sorcerers and Thar, Son of Thongor with the latter adapted from a novel Lin Carter was in the process of writing. Stop-motion animator Jim Danforth had initially been considered to direct, but instead the producers hired Harley Cokeliss. The effects work was to be handled by Barry Leith, best known for his work on "The Wombles". Subotsky had intended to have Arnold Schwarzenegger star as Thongor, but by the time Subotsky approached him Schwarzenegger had already signed a deal with Edward R. Pressman for Conan the Barbarian. The project was later cancelled.

=== Comics ===
In the 1970s, Marvel Comics writer Roy Thomas was a fan of Conan the Barbarian and wrote a memo to Marvel publisher Martin Goodman why it made good sense for Marvel to publish a sword and sorcery comic based on Conan as fans had specifically requested comics based on the character. Thomas' memo was convincing enough that Goodman approved a small licensing budget and allowed Stan Lee to decide what licenses would be worth pursuing. Due to the limited budget, Lee instead opted to pursue the rights to Thongor as Lee thought the character sounded more interesting than Conan but negotiations with Thongor author Lin Carter stalled when he demanded more than the $150 per issue licensing fee Marvel had offered and led to Thomas pursuing the Conan rights which led to the Conan the Barbarian comic series.

Thongor would ultimately be adapted as a feature in Marvel's anthology series Creatures on the Loose from issue 22 to issue 29 following the success of the Conan comics. Issues 22 and 23 served as an adaptation of Thieves of Zangabal while issues 24 through 29 adapted The Wizard of Lemuria.
