= List of American atheists =

This list of American atheists includes atheists born in, became citizens of, or lived in the United States. This list is arranged by surname.

== A ==
Name	Dates	Known for	Reference
Jason Aaron	1973–	Comics writer, known for his work on The Other Side, Scalped, Ghost Rider, Wolverine and PunisherMAX.	"I've been an atheist for many years, but I've remained fascinated by religion. If anything, I've become more fascinated by religion and faith after I lost mine."
Clark Adams	1969–2007	Freethought leader and atheist activist.	"In college, after reading material from American Atheists, he became, in his words, 'a pretty hard core atheist.'"
Larry Adler	1914–2001	Musician, widely acknowledged as one of the world's most skilled harmonica players.	"I was among friends and family who packed a chapel at Golders Green crematorium on Friday to hear more than two hours of tributes to Larry Adler. In accordance with Larry's wishes - he was an inveterate atheist who refused to recognise the supernatural in any shape or form - there were no religious observances."
Amy Alkon	1964–	Advice columnist known as the Advice Goddess, author of Ask the Advice Goddess, published in more than 100 newspapers within North America.	"Come on, somebody tell me I can't possibly have morals because I'm an atheist."
Robert Altman	1925–2006	Film director, recognised in 2006 with an Academy Honorary Award.	"Still, it's worth noting that by the age of 20 this whistle-blower had resisted two of the most powerful institutions - church and army, both. He is an atheist, "And I have been against all of these wars ever since.""
Natalie Angier	1958–	Nonfiction writer and science journalist for The New York Times; 1991 winner of the Pulitzer Prize for Beat Reporting.	"I may be an atheist, and I may be impressed that, through the stepwise rigor of science, its Spockian eyebrow of doubt always cocked, we have learned so much about the universe.
Aziz Ansari	1983–	Comedian.	Ansari has described himself as an atheist.
Isaac Asimov	1920–1992	Russian-born American author and professor of biochemistry, a highly prolific and successful writer of science fiction and popular science books. Widely considered a master of the science-fiction genre, he was considered one of the "Big Three" science-fiction writers during his lifetime.	"I am an atheist, out and out. It took me a long time to say it... I don't have the evidence to prove that God doesn't exist, but I so strongly suspect he doesn't that I don't want to waste my time."
Scott Atran	1952–	Anthropologist.	"I find it fascinating that among the brilliant scientists and philosophers at the conference, there was no convincing evidence presented that they know how to deal with the basic irrationality of human life and society other than to insist against all reason and evidence that things ought to be rational and evidence based. It makes me embarrassed to be a scientist and atheist."
Bob Avakian	1943–	Author of Away With All Gods! (2008) and Chairman of the Revolutionary Communist Party, USA.	Part Four of Away With All Gods! contains a section called "God Does Not Exist — And There Is No Good Reason to Believe In God".
Hector Avalos	1958–2021	Mexican-American professor of Religious Studies at Iowa State University and author of several books about religion.	"I was a child evangelist and preacher, and I used to go around a lot of churches in Arizona specifically [...] it was coming along sort of in stages [...] slowly through high school, and so by the first year of college, I pretty much had realised that I am an atheist."
Julius Axelrod	1912–2004	Nobel Prize winning biochemist, noted for his work on the release and reuptake of catecholamine neurotransmitters and major contributions to the understanding of the pineal gland and how it is regulated during the sleep-wake cycle.	"Although he became an atheist early in life and resented the strict upbringing of his parents' religion, he identified with Jewish culture and joined several international fights against anti-Semitism."

== B ==
Name	Dates	Known for	Reference
Kevin Bacon	1958-	Film and theatre actor whose notable roles include Animal House, A Few Good Men, Stir of Echoes, JFK, Apollo 13, Mystic River and Footloose.	"I don't believe in God, but if I did I would say that sex is a Godgiven right. Otherwise it's the end of our species."
Dan Barker	1949–	Atheist activist, co-president of the Freedom From Religion Foundation and author of Losing Faith In Faith: From Preacher To Atheist.	"Following five years of reading, Dan gradually outgrew his religious beliefs. "If I had limited myself to Christian authors, I'd still be a Christian today," Dan says. "I just lost faith in faith." He announced his atheism publicly in January, 1984."
Josh Barro	1984–	Journalist.	"Mentioning that I am an atheist seems to have led to a bunch of email trying to convince me of the existence of [a] god".
Charles T. Beaird	1922–2006	Industrialist, investor, newspaper publisher, philanthropist, philosopher, college professor, world traveler, and civic leader, a self-identified "liberal Republican" politician and a champion of civil rights.	"He had many friends across a wide spectrum of economic, social and religious backgrounds, all of whom he respected and honored. While Carolyn [his wife] was a devoted Presbyterian, he was a 'nontheist'."
Matt Besser	1967–	Comedian.	""My name is Matt Besser, and I'm an Arkansas Razorback. My father is a Jew from Little Rock, Ark., my mother was a Christian from Harrison, Ark., and somehow I'm an atheist now living in L.A. I am a Razorback living in the Razorback diaspora." Thus begins Woo Pig Sooie, Matt Besser's one-man comedic rant that fearlessly confronts all the folly and confusion of what it means to be religious in America."
Brannon Braga	1965–	TV producer and writer, creator of Star Trek: Enterprise.	"The fact that we're all gathered here today is kind of odd when you think about it, because we really have nothing to talk about other than our conviction that religion sucks, isn't science great, and how the hell do we get the other 95% of the population to come to their senses? We don't believe anything. Therefore, we have no need for a mythology."
Marshall Brain	1961–2024	Author, founder of HowStuffWorks.	"I am an atheist...I do not believe in any supernatural being, including the god of the bible.
Calvin Bridges	1889–1938	Geneticist, known for his work on fruit fly genetics.	"...he always remained true to his own concepts and ideals and did not dissimulate. His open designation of himself as "atheist" in "Who's Who in America" and his opposition to the invasion of the Soviet Union by the Allies..."
Isaac Brock	1975–	Singer, guitarist, banjoist, and songwriter for the indie rock band Modest Mouse.	Interviewer: "Do you still consider yourself an atheist?" Brock: "Pretty much, but there are things that make me think. Like that guy who played Jesus [Jim Caviezel] getting hit by lightning during the filming of that movie? That just makes you think, "I can't be 100 percent sure." But I'm not going to change my game plan anyway. [...] I'm 100 percent on the whole Christianity thing being a crock of shit, pretty much, but I don't give a fuck if other people are religious. Believe what you want. Whatever makes the day easier for you."
Phil Brooks	1978–	Professional wrestler, known by the ring name CM Punk.	"I am an atheist."
Lori Lipman Brown	1958–	Politician, lobbyist, lawyer, educator, and social worker supporter, Nevada Senator 1992–1994.	""You can be elected as an openly gay politician in this country, but you can't be elected as an openly atheistic one," said Lori Lipman Brown, who was hired last fall to be the Washington, D.C., lobbyist for an organization devoted to atheist causes, the Secular Coalition for America. She's believed to be the first paid lobbyist for the unbelievers in the nation's capital, the front lines of the culture wars. Now, all Brown is seeking is a constituency willing to go public. "Think of where the LGBT movement was 25 years ago," said Brown, who has worked on gay and lesbian rights issues as a legislator and attorney. "That's where atheists are today." [...] Brown, who is married and was raised a "humanistic Jew," talks about how she "came out" as an atheist several years ago, and how most atheists aren't "out yet" at work. She says atheist kids—like many gay children—are made to feel outcasts at school, and explains that she wants to erase the negative connotation to the word "atheist" just as homosexuals have reclaimed slurs like "queer" and "dyke.""
William Montgomery Brown	1855–1937	Episcopal bishop, communist author and atheist activist.	"An ecclesiastical court [...] sitting at Cleveland, Ohio, yesterday, found Dr. William Montgomery Brown, retired Bishop of Arkansas, a self-styled "Christian Atheist", guilty of heresy."
Ruth Mack Brunswick	1897–1946	Psychologist, a close confidant of and collaborator with Sigmund Freud.	"Although in her youth she had shared her father's Zionist sympathies, she was not otherwise involved in Jewish affairs and was by conviction an atheist."
Lawrence Bush	1951–	Author of several books of Jewish fiction and non-fiction, including Waiting for God: The Spiritual Explorations of a Reluctant Atheist.	"Caught between the atheism of his parents and the religion of his peers, Bush writes from what he calls "my own peculiar perch as an atheist who has nevertheless worked intimately in Jewish religious institutions as a writer and editor for much of my adult life." As a result, he writes about non-belief with an empathy for believers missing from the works of the New Atheists. [...] Bush may be reluctant, but he remains an atheist: "No matter how therapeutic religious observance might be for individuals, no matter how beguiling the symbols, metaphors, ceremonies, and community spirit, there is something about the surrender to God and to a prescribed worship tradition that simply offends my arrogant soul.""

== C ==
Name	Dates	Known for	Reference
George Carlin	1937–2008	Atheist comic, and author.	"Carlin, a staunch atheist, was certain about the great beyond. 'We're just a bag of garbage,' Carlin said. 'We're not going on to anything else.'"
Adam Carolla	1964–	Comedian/Radio personality	"I am not agnostic. I am atheist. I don't think there is no God, I know there's no God. I know there's no God same way I know many other laws in our universe. I know there's no God and I know most of the world knows that as well. They just won't admit it because there's another thing they know. They know they're going to die and it freaks them out. So most people don't have the courage to admit there's no God and they know it. They feel it. They try to suppress it. And if you bring it up they get angry because it freaks them out."
Asia Carrera	1973–	Former pornographic actress.	"So me, the completely unsuperstitious atheist, goes and posts on a message board that 'no, I don't believe in bad luck on Friday the 13th'."
Richard Carrier	1969–	Historian and philosopher, best known for his writings on Internet Infidels, where he served as Editor-in-Chief for several years.	"Religious Background: Parents were freethinking Methodists (mother was church secretary); Went to Sunday School, and to church on holy days; Philosophical Taoist at the age of 15; Atheist (Secular Humanist) at the age of 21; Extensive study of philosophy and world religions, formal and informal"
Vic Chesnutt	1964–2009	Singer-songwriter.	"Chesnutt's contrary nature was forged in isolation, in the backwoods of Pine County, Georgia. Though he loved the closeness of nature, and was loved by friends and parents, he found himself "at odds with the Protestant power structure". "I had a revelation that I was an atheist at a very early age," he remembers, "and I bumped up with these fuckers my whole time there. Sometimes it felt great to be at war with them. But I knew I needed to go somewhere else.""
Greta Christina	1961–	Atheist blogger, speaker, and author.	"The Top Ten Reasons I Don't Believe In God" by Greta Christina.
Eddie Collins (a.k.a. Greydon Square)	1981–	African-American hip hop artist.	"Written, produced and recorded by Greydon Square, The Compton Effect fuses atheism, critical thinking, and rationality with hip hop to spread free-thought and education about the dangers of faith and religion. It's a giant step towards the enlightenment of urban culture's dependency on religious indoctrination. "This is music that transcends genres," says Greydon. "This is bigger than just hip hop, these are cultural issues that need to be addressed before humanity can safely take another evolutionary step. I am the minority of the minority, an African-American atheist, from a community that does not tolerate threats to the status quote unless it's based on religion. This album is the manifestation of the thought, research and education that has been used to free myself from the shackles of religion.""
Jerry Coyne	1949–	Professor of biology, known for his books on evolution and commentary on the intelligent design debate.	"Yet they [the NCSE] can afford to ignore us because, in the end, where else can we atheists go for support against creationists? [...] Am I grousing because, as an atheist and a non-accommodationist, my views are simply ignored by the NAS and NCSE? Not at all. I don't want these organizations to espouse or include my viewpoint. I want religion and atheism left completely out of all the official discourse of scientific societies and organizations that promote evolution."
S. E. Cupp	1979–	Author of Losing Our Religion: The Liberal Media's Attack on Christianity and co-author (with Brett Joshpe) of Why You're Wrong About the Right.	"I am an atheist. I have been an atheist for fifteen years. ... I believe ... that Judeo-Christian values, religious tolerance, an objective press, the benevolence of Christianity, and civility and decency make for a better American democracy."

== D ==
Name	Dates	Known for	Reference
Marlene Dietrich	1901–1992	German-American actress, singer and entertainer, considered to be the first German actress to flourish in Hollywood.	"I have given up belief in a God."
Ani DiFranco	1970–	Grammy Award winning singer, guitarist and songwriter.	"Q: What song proves to you that there is a God? Ani: "I'm an atheist, for Chrissake!""
Matt Dillahunty	1969–	President of the Atheist Community of Austin, and is also a host of the live internet radio show "Non-Prophets Radio" and of the Austin TV access show The Atheist Experience	
Thomas M. Disch	1940–2008	Science fiction author and poet, winner of several awards.	"Friends said Disch had been despondent over ill health and Naylor's death in 2005. Yet he seemed in good humor for a brief Publishers Weekly interview last spring about his most recent book, "The Word of God." An outspoken atheist, Disch adopted the deity's perspective to score points on the absurdity of hell and similar numinous postulates. "One of the wonderful things about being God is you can say such nonsense and it's all true," he said."
Beth Ditto	1981–	Vocalist with the band Gossip.	""Southern life really was God-fearing. Granny Ditto was a strict Pentecostal, with hair down to her knees. I said in an interview not long ago that I didn't believe in God, and people called my mother saying, 'How do you feel about Beth being an atheist?'" She realised she was gay when she was only five years old. "I loved the sound of women's voices, not those of guys. I would pray because I didn't want to go to hell." She's not joking; her eyes fill with tears. "In my teens, my motor skills quit, I was shaking all the time." Did her pubic hair really turn white? "Yes. In fact, it's still half white!" A revelation about her atheism, at 19, saved Ditto from her fate. "I realised that every 2,000 years, there's a religion that happens to rule, and Christianity is just today's religion," she says."
Stanley Donen	1924–2019	Film director, best known for his musicals including Seven Brides for Seven Brothers and Singin' in the Rain; awarded honorary Academy Award for lifetime achievement.	
Jimmy Dore	1965–	Host of The Jimmy Dore Show and co-host of The Aggressive Progressives and The Young Turks	
Margaret Downey	1950–	Atheist activist, former President of Atheist Alliance International.	"Margaret read literary works of Thomas Paine and Robert G. Ingersoll which enabled her to develop a keen sense of revolutionary thought. She became an openly declared Atheist and activist in her twenties. Free from the constraints of religious dogma and patriarchal systems, Margaret became involved with the feminist movement. She fought for basic rights such as freedom of expression, freedom of choice, personal family leave for working parents, equal pay and promotion opportunities for women."

== E ==
Name	Dates	Known for	Reference
Paul Edwards	1923–2004	Austrian-American moral philosopher and editor of The Encyclopedia of Philosophy	"'There is no God, there is no life after death, Jesus was a man, and, perhaps most important, the influence of religion is by and large bad,' he wrote in the current issue of Free Inquiry, a magazine about secular humanism, a school of thought that emphasizes values based on experience rather than religion.".

== F ==
Name	Dates	Known as / for	Who	Reference
Richard Feynman	1918–1988	Physicist		
Jodie Foster	1962–	Actress	Film actress, director, and producer.	

== G ==
Name	Dates	Known as / for	Who	Reference
Anu Garg	1967–	Author	Author, speaker, engineer, and founder of Wordsmith.org.	
Susan Gerbic	1962–	Skeptical activist	Skeptical activist living in Salinas, California, co-founder of Monterey County Skeptics, founder and leader of the Guerrilla Skepticism on Wikipedia project, a regular contributor to Skeptical Inquirer, The Skeptic Zone podcast, and a fellow of the Committee for Skeptical Inquiry.	
Alice Greczyn	1986–	Actor	Book Wayward; founded "Dare to Doubt" web portal	
Herb Grosch	1918–2010	Computer scientist	Grosch's law	

== H ==
Name	Dates	Known as / for	Who	Reference
Jeff Hanneman	1964–2013	Musician	Former guitarist of metal band Slayer	
Guy Harrison	1963–	Author		"If a beautiful sunflower is somehow supposed to be evidence of the Christian god, then what is a parasitic worm that eats children's eyeballs evidence of?" From the book, "50 Simple Questions for Every Christian"
Amber Heard	1986–	Actress and model		At the age of 16, her best friend died in a car crash and Heard, who was raised Catholic, subsequently declared herself an atheist.
Christopher Hitchens	1949–2011	Author/Activist		
George Hrab	1971–	Musician, podcaster	Independent recording artist, host of Geologic Podcast	"George Hrab is an atheist in the Christmas City, a performer more famous globally than in his hometown and his "day job" is drumming for a funk band."
Jared Huffman	1964–	Congressman and state assemblymen	Member of the U.S. House of Representatives from California's 2nd district and member of the California State Assembly from the 6th district	"nonbeliever, a skeptic,"
Jamie Hyneman	1956–	Special-Effects Expert, Television Personality	Co-star of the Discovery Channel's MythBusters	"[A]ctually I'm pretty adamant about, you know, the whole God thing and it seems that skeptics are by and large atheists or something approaching that, which I strongly identify with. So it turned out to be a good thing and I have become enthusiastically part of it."

== J ==
Name	Dates	Known as / for	Who	Reference
Penn Jillette	1955–	Magician		"Believing there is no God gives me more room for belief in family, people, love, truth, beauty, sex, Jell-O and all the other things I can prove and that make this life the best life I will ever have"

== K ==
Name	Dates	Known as / for	Who	Reference
Kerry King	1964–	Musician	Lead/Rhythm Guitarist of Slayer	"I'm an atheist but I dont fuck with people believing in it."
Stanley Kubrick	1928–1999	Film director, screenwriter, producer, cinematographer and editor	Director whose films include 2001: A Space Odyssey, A Clockwork Orange and The Shining	"The whole idea of god is absurd. If anything, 2001 shows that what some people call "god" is simply an acceptable term for their ignorance. What they don't understand, they call "god"... Everything we know about the universe reveals that there is no god. I chose to do Dr. [Arthur C.] Clarke's story as a film because it highlights a critical factor necessary for human evolution; that is, beyond our present condition. This film is a rejection of the notion that there is a god; isn't that obvious?"

== L ==
Name	Dates	Known as / for	Who	Reference
John Landis	1950–	Film director	Director of movies such as The Blues Brothers, An American Werewolf in London and Animal House.	"I'm an atheist and I certainly don't believe or care about Satan or Jesus". Stated in a radio interview on BBC 5, 29 Oct 2010.
Robert Lees	1912–2004	Hollywood screenwriter	The Invisible Woman, The Black Cat, Bud Abbott Lou Costello Meet Frankenstein, Abbott and Costello Meet the Invisible Man and numerous television shows to 1983	Lees self-identified as an atheist and a humanist in the talks he gave to atheist and humanist organizations after his retirement in 1983. But he was most proud of the speech he gave to the House Committee on UnAmerican Activities in 1951, which led to his blacklisting.
Michael Lewis	1960–	Financial journalist and non-fiction author	Liar's Poker, Moneyball, The Blind Side: Evolution of a Game and The Big Short	Lewis self-identified as an atheist in his nonfiction book Boomerang. While researching the book, he speaks with a priest. Priest: "But what is your religion?" Lewis: "I don't have one." Priest: "But you believe in God?"; Lewis: "No."
H. P. Lovecraft	1890–1937	Author	American writer of weird fiction and horror fiction such as "The Call of Cthulhu" and At the Mountains of Madness	
Dave Lombardo	1965–	Musician	Drummer for American heavy metal band Slayer	
Jeff Lowder	1973–	Author	Founder of Internet Infidels	

== M ==
Name	Dates	Known as / for	Who	Reference
Seth MacFarlane	1973–	Comedian, actor, writer, producer, singer	Creator of Family Guy, American Dad!, The Cleveland Show	"I do not believe in God. I'm an atheist. I consider myself a critical thinker, and it fascinates me that in the 21st century most people still believe in, as George Carlin puts it, 'the invisible man living in the sky'."
Bill Maher	1956–	Comedian	Host of Real Time with Bill Maher	"I'm an atheist pot smoker"
Abby Martin	1984–	Journalist	Creator and host of The Empire Files, Breaking the Set, and Media Roots	"I'd say I'm more atheist than not."
Mike Mentzer	1951–2001	IFBB professional bodybuilder	1979 Mr. Olympia heavyweight winner	"There is what's called a rational view of a creator. As I said, there cannot be a God as He is commonly defined. God is infinite, God is everywhere, God created the universe-that's an interesting one. There's no such thing as creating the universe or causing the universe to come into existence, as the universe is the ground of all causation! If there was a God, He would have to consist of some material substance and He'd have to live somewhere. Therefore, existence always existed, even in the context you just gave. If, as you said, it was proven somehow beyond a shadow of a doubt there was a rational creator and a life hereafter, yes, I would grab at the chance to be with my mother and father again. "
Sean Murphy	1960–	Comics writer/artist	Hellblazer: City of Demons, Joe the Barbarian, American Vampire: Survival of the Fittest	Discussing his series Punk Rock Jesus in 2012: "Over my evolution from Catholic to atheist, I've inhabited a number of different outlooks, and many of the characters [in Punk Rock Jesus] embody those roles."

== N ==
Name	Dates	Known as / for	Who	Reference
Michael Neumann	1946–	Philosopher	Professor of philosophy at Trent University, noted for his work on utilitarianism, rationality and antisemitism.	
Michael Newdow	1953–	Atheist activist	Physician and attorney.	Sued a school district on the grounds that its requirement that children recite the U.S. Pledge of Allegiance, containing the words "under God", breached the separation-of-church-and-state provision in the establishment clause of the United States Constitution.

== O ==
Name	Dates	Known as / for	Who	Reference
Madalyn Murray O'Hair	1919–1995	Atheist activist	Founder of American Atheists, campaigner for the separation of church and state	Filed the lawsuit that led the US Supreme Court to ban teacher-led prayer and Bible reading in public schools.
Joyce Carol Oates	1938–	Author	Author and Professor of Creative Writing at Princeton University.	Q: "I noticed that nobody uses the "A-word"—atheist—for you. Perhaps it is a step beyond nontheist or humanist. Do you identify as an atheist? Oates: "That's a good question. I have met Christopher Hitchens once or twice, and he has a book that I'm sure you've either read or are aware of titled God is Not Great: How Religion Poisons Everything. He is very adversarial, very eloquent, and very funny in his interviews. And, of course, he is very much a self-declared atheist. "I'm not averse to acknowledging it, but as a novelist and a writer, I really don't want to confront and be antagonistic toward people. As soon as you declare that you are an atheist, it's like somebody declaring that he is the son of God; it arouses a lot antagonism. I'm wondering whether it might be better to avoid arousing this antagonism in order to find—not compromise—some common ground."
Culbert Olson	1876–1962	Politician	Politician and Governor of California (1939–1943).	(see source)
Bree Olson	1986–	Pornographic actress	Pornographic actress and Penthouse Pet.	"I'm atheist. I know that when you die, there's no heaven, so that really bums me out. I wish I could be Christian and say I'm going to heaven but I know I'm not. It sucks to know the truth."
Patton Oswalt	1969–	Comedian and actor	Actor and comedian.	In his December 2004 Comedy Central stand-up special, No Reason to Complain, Oswalt said he was a "stone cold atheist." In his 2004 comedy album, Feelin' Kind of Patton, Oswalt hypothesizes what might happen during the Apocalypse: "I'm wrong and there is a God." Oswalt has referenced his atheism in his 2009 special, My Weakness is Strong, and by Katt Williams in the opening act of The Comedy Central Roast of Flavor Flav.

== P ==
Name	Dates	Known as / for	Who	Reference
Camille Paglia	1947–	Author	post-feminist literary and cultural critic.	(see source)
Linus Pauling	1901–1994	Scientist	Chemist, Nobel Laureate in Chemistry (1954) and Peace (1962)	"... I [Pauling] am not, however, militant in my atheism. The great English theoretical physicist Paul Dirac is a militant atheist. I suppose he is interested in arguing about the existence of God. I am not. It was once quipped that there is no God and Dirac is his prophet."
Michael B. Paulkovich	1955–	Author, editor, Inventor, Space Systems Engineer	Author of Beyond the Crusades; editor for The American Rationalist, contributor to Free Inquiry, columnist for American Atheist Magazine	"Most religions represent artless attempts at philosophy and science, embracing superstitions: ancient guesswork and myths bonded together by the crazy glue of faith." - Beyond the Crusades
John Allen Paulos	1945–	Scientist	Writer and Professor of mathematics at Temple University in Philadelphia.	Author of Irreligion: A Mathematician Explains Why the Arguments for God Just Don't Add Up (2007)
Philip K. Paulson	1947–2006	Atheist activist	Plaintiff in a series of lawsuits to remove a Christian cross from a prominent summit in the city of San Diego.	"The real message is equal treatment under the law, and religious neutrality. That's the purpose of why I did it. It has nothing to do with me being an atheist. The fact is, the Constitution calls for no preference and that's why every judge ruled for me."
Sam Perrin	1901–1998	Screenwriter	Emmy Award-winning screenwriter.	"On The Burns and Allen Show, he [George Balzer] was paired with the more experienced scripter Sam Perrin. The two writers were a natural team, despite the fact that Balzer was a devout Catholic and Perrin a Jewish atheist."
Julia Phillips	1944–2002	Film producer	Academy Award-winning film producer and author, the first woman to win an Oscar as a producer.	"Both her parents came from Russian Jewish backgrounds, but Julia was brought up as an atheist and an avid reader in Brooklyn, before the family moved, first to Great Neck, Long Island, and then to Milwaukee."
Steven Pinker	1954–	Scientist	Canadian-born American psychologist.	"I never outgrew my conversion to atheism at 13, but at various times was a serious cultural Jew."
Allan Pinkerton	1819–1884	Businessperson	British (Scottish born) American detective and spy, best known for creating the Pinkerton Agency, the first detective agency of the United States.	"Although christened by a Baptist minister in the Gorbals (25 August 1819), he had a churchless upbringing and was a lifelong atheist."
Brad Pitt	1963–	Actor	Actor and film producer Pitt has received two Academy Award nominations and four Golden Globe Award nominations, winning one.	BILD: Do you believe in God? Brad Pitt (smiling): 'No, no, no!' BILD: Is your soul spiritual? Brad Pitt: 'No, no, no! I'm probably 20 per cent atheist and 80 per cent agnostic. I don't think anyone really knows. You'll either find out or not when you get there, until then there's no point thinking about it.'"
Michael Pitt	1981–	Actor	Actor and musician.	"Does Pitt think suicide is selfish? 'I see why people think it is, and sometimes I do. And sometimes I don't think it's selfish. I'm probably an atheist, though I was raised a Catholic " and that whole religion is based on the first suicide, in many ways.'"
Daniel W. Posin	1909–2003	Physicist, educator	Six Emmy awards for educational programming in television, 1972 recipient of the James T. Grady-James H. Stack Award for Interpreting Chemistry, nominated for the Nobel Peace Prize six times	"Posin had always been resolutely nonreligious."
Derek J. de Solla Price	1922–1983	Scientist	British-American historian of science.	"...my father [Derek] was a British Atheist... from a rather well known Sephardic Jewish family..."

== R ==
Name	Dates	Known as / for	Who	Reference
James Rachels	1941–2003	Philosopher	Philosopher who specialized in ethics.	Rachels argued for the nonexistence of God based on the impossibility of a being worthy of worship.
Justin Raimondo	1951–2019	Blogger	Author and the editorial director of Antiwar.com	"Although I was raised a Catholic, I am not a believer."
Ayn Rand	1905–1982	Author and philosopher	Russian-born American author and founder of Objectivism	"I am an intransigent atheist, but not a militant one."
James Randi	1928–2020	Skeptical investigator	Magician, debunker, and founder of the James Randi Educational Foundation.	"...I am a concerned, forthright, declared, atheist."
A. Philip Randolph	1889–1979	Activist	African-American leader during the civil rights movement.	"Although greatly influenced by his father's political and racial attitudes, Randolph resisted pressure to enter the ministry and later became an atheist."
Darrel Ray	1950–	Psychologist and author	Founder of Recovering from Religion and Secular Therapy Project.	"Dr. Ray is the host of a new podcast, produced and published by Dogma Debate, LLC to rid ourselves of the affects [sic] and control that our religious culture has had on the way we view sex, our bodies, the bodies of others, and so many other important ideas that affect our quality of life."
Ron Reagan	1958–	Activist and journalist	Magazine journalist, board member of the politically activistic Creative Coalition, son of former U. S. President Ronald Reagan.	"I'm an atheist so... I can't be elected to anything, because polls all say that people won't elect an atheist.
Keanu Reeves	1964–	Actor	Canadian-American actor best known for his portrayal of Neo in the action film trilogy The Matrix and Ted Logan in Bill & Ted's Excellent Adventure and Bill & Ted's Bogus Journey.	"Film star Keanu Reeves, promoting his new supernatural thriller Constantine, told a South African newspaper that making the film - about demonic possession - had not caused him to embrace religion, and he still thought of himself as an atheist.
Carl Reiner	1922–2020	Actor	Actor, film director, producer, writer and comedian, winner of nine Emmy Awards	"I'm not a believer, I call myself an atheist. It was man who invented God. I once wrote that there are 15 things I know about God, and one is that he is allergic to shellfish. There are far too many commandments and you really only need one: Do not hurt anybody."
Stan Rice	1942–2006	Author	Poet and artist, Professor of English and Creative Writing at San Francisco State University, and husband of writer Anne Rice.	Reviewing Anne Rice's Christ the Lord: Out of Egypt, Matt Thorne noted: "In a long author's note, Rice explains how she experienced an old-fashioned, strict Roman Catholic childhood in the 1940s and 1950s, before leaving the Church at 18 due to sexual pressure and her desire to read authors she considered forbidden to her, such as Kierkegaard, Sartre, and Camus. Two years later she married a passionate atheist, the poet and artist Stan Rice, and in 1974, began a literary career that she now retrospectively views as representing her 'quest for meaning in a world without God'."
Richard Rodgers	1902–1979	Musician	Composer of the music for more than 900 songs and 40 Broadway musicals, best known for his songwriting partnerships with the lyricists Lorenz Hart and Oscar Hammerstein II.	Rodgers' biographer William G Hyland states: "That Richard Rodgers would recall, at the very beginning of his memoirs, his great-grandmother's death and its religious significance for his family suggests his need to justify his own religious alienation. Richard became an atheist, and as a parent he resisted religious instruction for his children. According to his wife, Dorothy, he felt that religion was based on "fear" and contributed to "feelings of guilt."
Henry Rollins	1961–	Musician and activist	Singer-songwriter, spoken word artist, stand-up comedian, author, actor, activist and publisher. Associated acts: Black Flag, Rollins Band.	"I don't have any spiritual beliefs. There is no god in my world.", "I guess necessity has shaped my "non-belief". I respect someone's religion and any reason that brought them to it but it's never been something I felt I needed in my life."
Ned Rorem	1923–2022	Musician	Composer	"I'm an atheist"
Amber Rose	1983–	Television personality	Model, Television Personality, Onlyfans producer who dated Kanye West and modeled for Louis Vuitton	"We don’t believe in God or a higher power. We definitely don’t believe in the devil. So, we don’t worship anything. We believe in the Big Bang theory. We don’t believe that God said, ‘Let there be light’ and Noah’s ark – stuff like that"
Ernestine Rose	1810–1892	Abolitionist, suffragette	Activist, organizer	Founder of atheist feminism.

== S ==
Name	Dates	Known as / for	Who	Reference
Oliver Sacks	1933–2015	Scientist	American-based British neurologist, who has written popular books about his patients, the most famous of which is Awakenings.	"All of which makes the [Jewish] Wingate Prize a matter of bemusement. "Yes, tell me," he says, frowning. "What is it, and why are they giving it to an old Jewish atheist who has unkind things to say about Zionism?" "
Margaret Sanger	1879–1966	Activist	birth-control activist, founder of the American Birth Control League, a forerunner to Planned Parenthood. The masthead motto of her newsletter, The Woman Rebel, read: "No Gods, No Masters".	see source
George Santayana	1863–1952	Philosopher	Spanish philosopher in the naturalist and pragmatist traditions who called himself a "Catholic atheist."	"Santayana playfully called himself 'a Catholic atheist,' but in spite of the fact that he deliberately immersed himself in the stream of Catholic religious life, he never took the sacraments. He neither literally regarded himself as a Catholic nor did Catholics regard him as a Catholic." "My atheism, like that of Spinoza, is true piety towards the universe, and denies only gods fashioned by men in their own image, to be servants of their human interests."
Robert Sapolsky	1957–	Scientist	Professor of Biological Sciences and Professor of Neurology and Neurological Sciences at Stanford University.	Dan Barker: "When we invited Robert Sapolsky to speak at one of out national conventions to receive our 'Emperor Has No Clothes Award', Robert wrote to me, 'Sure! Get the local Holiday Inn to put up a sign that says Welcome, Hell-bound Atheists!' [...] So, welcome you hell-bound atheist to Freethought Radio, Robert." Sapolsky: "Well, delighted to be among my kindred souls." [...] Annie Laurie Gaylor: So how long have you been a kindred non-soul, what made you an atheist Robert?" Sapolsky: "Oh, I was about fourteen or so... I was brought up very very religiously, orthodox Jewish background and major-league rituals and that sort of thing [...] and something happened when I was fourteen, and no doubt what it was really about was my gonads or who knows what, but over the course of a couple of weeks there was some sort of introspective whatever, where I suddenly decided this was all gibberish. And, among other things, also deciding there's no free will, but not in a remotely religious context, and deciding all of this was nonsense, and within a two week period all of that belief stuff simply evaporated."
Adam Savage	1967–	Television presenter	Television co-host on the program MythBusters.	"I'm actually the fourth generation in my family to have no practical use for the church, or God, or religion. My children continue this trend."
Dan Savage	1964–	Author	Author and sex advice columnist.	"If Osama bin Laden were in charge, he would slit my throat; my God, I'm an atheist, a hedonist, and a faggot." Skipping Towards Gomorrah: The Seven Deadly Sins and the Pursuit of Happiness in America Savage declared in his syndicated sex advice column: "I'm Catholic—in a cultural sense, not an eat-the-wafer, say-the-rosary, burn-down-the-women's-health-center sense. I attended Quigley Preparatory Seminary North, a Catholic high school in Chicago for boys thinking of becoming priests. I got to meet the Pope in 1979..."
John Searle	1932–	Philosopher	Philosopher, Slusser Professor of Philosophy at the University of California, Berkeley, widely noted for contributions to the philosophy of language, the philosophy of mind, and to social philosophy.	Reviewing an episode of the Channel 4 series Voices: "On the one hand, Sir John Eccles, a quiet-spoken theist with the most devastating way of answering questions with a single "yes", on the other, Professor Searle, a flamboyant atheist using words I've never heard of or likely to again "now we know that renal secretions synthesize a substance called angiotensin and that angiotensin gets into the hypothalamus and causes a series of neuron firings."
Claude Shannon	1916–2001	Scientist	Electrical engineer and mathematician, has been called "the father of information theory", and was the founder of practical digital circuit design theory.	"Shannon described himself as an atheist and was outwardly apolitical."
Michael Shermer	1954–	Author	Science writer and editor of Skeptic magazine. Has stated that he is an atheist, but prefers to be called a skeptic.	"I am an atheist. There, I said it. Are you happy, all you atheists out there who have remonstrated with me for adopting the agnostic moniker? If "atheist" means someone who does not believe in God, then an atheist is what I am. But I detest all such labels. Call me what you like — humanist, secular humanist, agnostic, nonbeliever, nontheist, freethinker, heretic, or even bright. I prefer skeptic."
Don Siegel	1912–1991	Actor	Film director and producer.	"His first chance came in 1944, when after a long period of feuding with Warner, Warner offered him a short. Siegel himself is a Jewish-born atheist. "I wondered what I could do which would most annoy Warner as a Jew; and decided on a present-day retelling of the story of the nativity. To my surprise he liked the idea, and it was a big success. So then I wondered what else I could do which would irritate him and tried something quite different, which was Hitler Lives."
Herbert A. Simon	1916–2001	Social scientist	Political scientist and economist, one of the most influential social scientists of the 20th century.	"The "ardent debater" championed unpopular causes, "but from conviction rather than cussedness", in high-school discussions: the single tax, free trade, unilateral disarmament, strengthening the League of Nations. Indeed, his first publication, whilst still in grade school, was a letter to the Editor of the Milwaukee Journal, defending atheism."
Bob Smith	1969–	Artist	Graphic artist, who prompted controversy with his creation of Jesus Dress Up.	Smith explains his atheism and answers questions about his position on his website.
Brendan Powell Smith	–	Artist	Artist, author, and creator of The Brick Testament, which illustrates stories from the Bible by dioramas of LEGO bricks.	"I've been fascinated with religion ever since I became an atheist at about the age of 13. Prior to that I had been a regular churchgoer and my mother was even a Sunday School teacher at our local Episcopal church. But as my childhood was approaching its end, I had this idea (I'm not sure from where) that it would be a good idea to "prepare for adulthood" by consciously trying rid myself of what seemed like childish ways of thinking. I recognized superstitions for what they were, and tried to turn away from "magical thinking". I didn't intend for any of this to affect my religious beliefs, but in the end it did in a profound way, and soon enough I found myself the only atheist I knew amongst my family, friends, and community."
Charles Lee Smith	1887–1964	Atheist activist	Atheist activist and an editor of the Truth Seeker until his death. He also founded the American Association for the Advancement of Atheism. Smith was arrested twice in 1928 for selling atheist literature and for blasphemy. Since he refused to swear an oath to God on the Bible, he was not allowed to testify in his own defense.	"Closer to home, in Arkansas, atheist activist Charles Lee Smith was twice arrested in 1928, first for selling atheist literature and then for blasphemy. Moreover, since he couldn't as an atheist swear an oath to God on the Bible, he wasn't permitted to testify in his own defense!"
Quentin Smith	1952–2020	Philosopher	Philosopher and professor of philosophy at Western Michigan University. Smith co-authored the book Theism, Atheism and Big Bang Cosmology with William Lane Craig.	Smith has written papers arguing for the nonexistence of God.
Robert Smith	1972–	Sportsperson	Football player and analyst.	"Former Minnesota Vikings running back Robert Smith, an atheist, says he has no objection to making religious counseling and services available to interested players."
Warren Allen Smith	1921–2017	Author	Writer, activist and humanist.	Author of Who's Who in Hell.
Steven Soderbergh	1963–	Filmmaker	Filmmaker, Academy Award-winning director of such films as Traffic, Erin Brockovich, Ocean's Eleven, Sex, Lies, and Videotape and Che (film).	"I'm a hardcore atheist."
Todd Solondz	1959–	Film director	Screenwriter and independent film director known for his style of dark, thought-provoking satire.	In response to the question "Is there a God?", Solondz said "Well, me, I'm an atheist, so I don't really believe there is. But I suppose I could be proven wrong."
Britney Spears	1981–	Singer and dancer	Teen pop idol.	"Like I said, God would not have let this happened to me. I don't believe in god anymore because of the way my children and my family have treated me. There is nothing to believe in anymore. I'm an atheist y'all."
Richard Spencer	1978–	White supremacist	President of the National Policy Institute, and said to have created the term "alt-right"	"I'm an atheist."
Robert Spitzer	1932–2015	Social scientist	Psychiatrist, Professor of Psychiatry at Columbia University, a major architect of the modern classification of mental disorders.	"Dr Spitzer has said repeatedly that as an "atheist Jew" his only interest in the issue is scientific truth, adding that an orthodoxy which forbids acknowledgement of the possibility of change is as flawed as that which labels homosexuality an act of will and morally wrong."
Richard Stallman	1953–	Activism	Software freedom activist, hacker, and software developer.	see source
Pete Stark	1931–2020	Politician	United States House of Representative (D-CA), the first openly atheist member of Congress.	Stark called himself "a Unitarian who does not believe in a supreme being" and has been identified as an atheist.
Wayne Static	1965–2014	Musician	Frontman for Industrial Metal band Static-X	quoted saying that he is an atheist in an interview with concertlivewire.com
Victor J. Stenger	1937–2014	Scientist	Physicist, emeritus professor of Physics and Astronomy at the University of Hawaii and adjunct professor of Philosophy at the University of Colorado.	Author of the book God: The Failed Hypothesis.
Bruce Sterling	1954–	Author	Science fiction author, best known for his novels and his seminal work on the Mirrorshades anthology, which helped define the cyberpunk genre.	In response to the question "What do you think about Umberto Ecco's words that "libraries are the houses of God", and since you are doing that Dead Media project - I kinda connected you two in my head?", Sterling said "I don't believe in God. I read Umberto Eco, though."
J. Michael Straczynski	1954–	Writer	Writer and producer, creator of Babylon 5.	When asked what book he would choose to memorize, Straczynski said "Despite being an atheist, I would probably choose the Book of Job."
Leonard Susskind	1940–	Scientist	Theoretical physicist; a founding father of superstring theory and professor of theoretical physics at Stanford University.	In a review of Susskind's book The Cosmic Landscape: String Theory and the Illusion of Intelligent Design, Michael Duff writes that Susskind is "a card-carrying atheist."
Julia Sweeney	1959–	Comedian	Actor and comedian. Alumna of Saturday Night Live, author/performer of a one-woman autobiographical stage show about finding atheism: Letting Go of God.	see source

== T ==
Name	Dates	Known as / for	Who	Reference
Eddie Tabash		Atheist activist	Lawyer, atheist activist and debater.	"It is long overdue for Atheistic arguments to be given a seat at the table of the marketplace of ideas in today's world. I have established this website in the hope of providing a platform for the dissemination of these arguments."
Matt Taibbi	1970–	Journalist	Journalist and political writer.	"Matt Taibbi, interviewed by 'Friendly Atheist' Hemant Mehta: "HM: What role should religion play in the political arena? MT: Well, I'm an atheist/agnostic, so I would say none. People should stick to solving the problems they have the tools to solve."
Jeffrey Tayler		Journalist	American born author and journalist resident in Russia since 1993.	"But despite his own atheism and his distaste at his companion's relentless evangelising, he comes to understand the appeal of religion to desert dwellers. "Nowhere for me had words Qur'anic or biblical taken on as much life as they had here in the Sahara, where, apart from the Word, there was nothing but rock, sky and sun."
Paul Taylor	1930–2018	Choreographer	Choreographer.	"Two works created during the last year complete the bill. In the Beginning is a joke that doesn't come off. The story, filtered through Taylor's profound atheism, is that of the book of Genesis."
Teller	1948–	Illusionist	Illusionist, comedian and writer best known as the silent half of the comedy magic duo known as Penn & Teller, along with Penn Jillette.	"Never shy about their [Penn and Teller] atheism (Penn's got the Nevada license plates ATHEIST and GODLESS), the two have been raising their voices – even the oft-silent Teller – to decry the muddying line between church and state. 'Atheists are saying, 'All right, we've had enough,'" Teller says."
Tiffany Thayer	1902–1959	Author and actor	Actor, author and founder of the Fortean Society.	"Characterizing himself as an atheist, an anarchist, and a skeptic, he enjoyed his image of impudent prurience, though he revealed little to the public of his personal life."
Pat Tillman	1976–2004	Athlete, U.S. Army Ranger	Football player, died in combat in Afghanistan in 2004, subject of the documentary The Tillman Story	Tillman's purported last words were uttered to a fellow soldier who was praying aloud, "Would you shut your (expletive) mouth?" yelled Tillman. "God's not going to help you. You need to do something for yourself, you sniveling..." Various news reports after his death attest to his atheism.
Frank J. Tipler	1947–	Scientist	Mathematical physicist and professor at Tulane University.	Although an atheist, Tipler believes 'God' will eventually exist in the last moments of the universe: "The theory is basically this: just as the Earth began with a Big Bang, so it will end, in a single point, which Tipler calls the Omega Point. And just as life on Earth began with a single cell which colonised the planet, so life at the end of time will, according to Tipler, "become omnipresent, omnipotent, and omniscient which are the three attributes of God". The Omega Point/God is the point of ultimate, infinite knowledge when the earth will be inhabited by beings who are, to all intents and purposes, computers. Tipler says they can be called beings because he defines life as information processing, as did the famous biologist Richard Dawkins, who called computers "biological objects". [...] Tipler says his own viewpoint is that of an atheist. Though brought up a Christian fundamentalist, he rejected religion when he was 16, because the Church claimed the Earth was 6,000 years old, when he knew that it went back 4.6 billion years. [...] Still, it seems excessively generous for the beings of the future to want to resurrect all of us. Tipler answers that they will be extremely intelligent beings, and therefore extremely curious, interested in all the variations that preceded them, from the very beginning, just as today's scientists are working to recreate the first single cell, in all its possible forms. "I think the evidence is very strong that this particular version of you and this particular version of me will actually be there in the future. It will be you and me emulated down to the atom." Why, he says, we might even end up repeating the whole interview." Megan Tressider, 'The Megan Tressider Interview: Meaning of life is, er, God and Omega; Physicist Frank J Tipler, an atheist, says he has found God',

== U ==
Name	Dates	Known as / for	Who	Reference
Brendon Urie	1987–	Musician	Singer, songwriter, musician and multi-instrumentalist. He is best known as the lead vocalist of Panic! at the Disco.	"If God were real and he had created me, he would've said, 'Give him some big lips and a wide nose. But make him white. And atheist.'"

== V ==
Name	Dates	Known as / for	Who	Reference
Kurt Vonnegut	1922–2007	Author	Author, writer of Cat's Cradle, among other books.	"I am an atheist (or at best a Unitarian who winds up in churches quite a lot)."
Sarah Vowell	1969–	Author	Author, journalist, humorist, and commentator.	When asked if there is a God, Vowell answered "Absolutely not."

== W ==
Name	Dates	Known as / for	Who	Reference
Dorian Wallace	1985	Musician	Political composer and music therapist.	"There were some secular bloggers who were criticizing the extremist religious culture and were massacred in response."
W. Grey Walter	1910–1977	Scientist	Neurophysiologist famous for his work on brain waves, and robotician.	"A firm atheist, he was interested in, though unconvinced by, the paranormal, and also did research on hypnosis."
James D. Watson	1928–2025	Scientist	1962–Nobel-laureate co-discover of the structure of DNA.	When asked by a student if he believed in God, Watson replied "Oh, no. Absolutely not... The biggest advantage to believing in God is you don't have to understand anything, no physics, no biology. I wanted to understand."
Steven Weinberg	1933–2021	Scientist	Theoretical physicist. He won the Nobel Prize in Physics in 1979 for the unification of electromagnetism and the weak force into the electroweak force.	Azpurua: "Would it be accurate to say that you are an atheist?" Weinberg: "Yes. I don't believe in God, but I don't make a religion out of not believing in God. I don't organize my life around that."
Gene Weingarten	1951–	Journalist	Humor writer for The Washington Post.	"I am a devout atheist but can't explain why the moon is exactly the right size, and gets positioned so precisely between the Earth and the sun, that total solar eclipses are perfect. It bothers me."
Victor Frederick Weisskopf	1908–2002	Scientist	Austrian-American theoretical physicist, co-founder and board member of the Union of Concerned Scientists.	"...Victor Weisskopf, who describes himself as an atheist Viennese Jew...."
Orson Welles	1915–1985	Film Director	Filmmaker/Director, actor, writer, and producer best known for his film, Citizen Kane.	Near the end of his life Welles was dining at Ma Maison, his favorite restaurant in Los Angeles, when proprietor Patrick Terrail conveyed an invitation from the head of the Greek Orthodox Church, who asked Welles to be his guest of honor at divine liturgy at Saint Sophia Cathedral. Welles replied, 'Please tell him I really appreciate that offer, but I am an atheist.'
Pete Wernick	1946–	Musician	bluegrass banjo player and songwriter.	
Jerry Wexler	1917–2008	Journalist	Music journalist and producer, regarded as one of the major record industry players behind music from the 1950s through the 1980s, coiner of the term Rhythm & Blues.	"The music business held a curious appeal to a man who had hitherto dreamed only of becoming the Jewish John O'Hara – and whose fiction had been published in Story magazine. It was dominated by Jews, and therefore excluded from Wasp high culture. "I was determined to use all my wit and courage to confound the Christian tormenters," Wexler says, referring to the "immanent anti-Semitism that existed then and exists now. It's like Dr John says, 'I don't want no one hangin' no jacket on me'." He is, in fact, a confirmed atheist of many years' standing."
Joss Whedon	1964–	Screenwriter	Screenwriter and director, most famous for creating the Buffy the Vampire Slayer franchise.	Asked if there was a God, Whedon answered, "No."
Edmund White	1940–	Author	Novelist, short-story writer and critic.	"If I were a believer, perhaps I'd have some answers. As an atheist, I can't even imagine that I was spared so that I wouldn't die a fool or a sinner. Of course the values we're left with are all the residue of Christianity, though shorn of system and stripped of finality. An atheist lives in the present, since there will be no eternity ('They were shut up in days,' John McGahern says with strangely beautiful concision in Amongst Women.) Perhaps that's why I was given so much of the present to work with, since it's all I'll be getting."
Earl Wild	1915–2010	Musician	Classical pianist, considered a leading virtuoso of his generation.	"He is against pianists who express concentration by leaning their heads back with their eyes closed: "When you give a recital, God doesn't help you." (Wild claims to be an atheist largely for musical reasons, having at age ten asked his mother how there could be a God when the organist at their local church in Pittsburgh was so lousy.)"
Gene Wilder	1933–2016	Actor	Actor best known for his role as Willy Wonka.	"Well, I'm a Jewish-Buddhist-Atheist, I guess."
David Sloan Wilson	1949–	Scientist	Evolutionary biologist, son of Sloan Wilson, proponent of multilevel selection theory and author of several popular books on evolution.	I don't believe in God. I tell people I'm an atheist, but a nice atheist.
Sherwin Wine	1928–2007	Philosopher	Founder of the non-theistic Society for Humanistic Judaism, who has also called himself an "ignostic".	" To the consternation and dismay of his fellow Reform rabbis, Wine publicly declares, "I am an atheist," and has expunged the name of God from all services at his temple. Wine is a rather special sort of atheist. Technically, he calls himself an "ignostic," which Wine defines as someone who will only accept the truth of statements that can be empirically proved. "I find no adequate reason to accept the existence of a supreme person," he insists[,] although he is willing to change his mind if new evidence appears. "
Alan Wolfe	1942–	Political scientist	political scientist and sociologist, director of the Boisi Center for Religion and American Public Life.	"Wolfe, a self-proclaimed atheist, said he recognizes the importance of being open to religious ideas."
Tom Wolfe	1931–2018	Author	Author and member of 'New Journalism' school.	
Steve Wozniak	1950–	Computer engineer	Co-founder of Apple Computer and inventor of the Apple I and Apple II.	I am also atheist or agnostic (I don't even know the difference). I've never been to church and prefer to think for myself. I do believe that religions stand for good things, and that if you make irrational sacrifices for a religion, then everyone can tell that your religion is important to you and can trust that your most important inner faiths are strong.
Elizur Wright	1804–1885	Scientist	Mathematician and abolitionist, sometimes described as the "father of life insurance" in the United States.	In Abolitionist, Actuary, Atheist: Elizur Wright and the Reform Impulse, Wright's biographer Lawrence B. Goodheart describes him as "an evangelical atheist, an impassioned actuary, a liberal who advocated state regulation, an individualist who championed social cooperation, and a very private public crusader"
Will Wright	1960–	Technology	Computer game designer and co-founder of the game development company Maxis, known for the 2008 game Spore	"When Wright was nine his father died of leukaemia and he moved with his mother and younger sister to Baton Rouge, Louisiana. There he enrolled in the Episcopal High School and duly became an atheist."

== Y ==
Name	Dates	Known as / for	Who	Reference
Eliezer Yudkowsky	1979–	Artificial Intelligence researcher	Artificial intelligence researcher concerned with the Singularity, and an advocate of Friendly Artificial Intelligence.	"When I heard on the phone that Yehuda had died, there was never a moment of disbelief. I knew what kind of universe I lived in. How is my religious family to comprehend it, working, as they must, from the assumption that Yehuda was murdered by a benevolent God? The same loving God, I presume, who arranges for millions of children to grow up illiterate and starving; the same kindly tribal father-figure who arranged the Holocaust and the Inquisition's torture of witches. I would not hesitate to call it evil, if any sentient mind had committed such an act, permitted such a thing. But I have weighed the evidence as best I can, and I do not believe the universe to be evil, a reply which in these days is called atheism."

== Z ==
Name	Dates	Known as / for	Who	Reference
Frank Zappa	1940–1993	Solo music, The Mothers, The song "Valley Girl" which he performed with his daughter Moon Zappa	Musician (solo, and with The Mothers of Invention), composer, activist for free-speech and against censorship	"Of numerous atheist rock musicians, Frank Zappa ranks among the most outspoken."
Emile Zuckerkandl	1922–2013	Biologist	Austrian-American biologist considered one of the founders of the field of molecular evolution. He is best known for introducing, with Linus Pauling, the concept of the molecular clock, which set the stage for the neutral theory of molecular evolution.	"God brought evil-doing into the world when he devised animals that feed on other animals. The horrific pain that living beings inflict upon other living beings is part of a world created by a "good" God? Good God! Observations made at the level of the informational macromolecules and their interactions do not suggest that living systems have been built up thanks to the insights and decisions of a master engineer. Why would God tinker? Doesn't He know in advance the biological pathways that work? Isn't a tinkering God one who loudly says "I am not"? And why would He say so if He existed? [...] A direct implication of intelligent design, is that it could only have been carried out by a God. A standard response ... when hard-pressed, they proclaim that it is all a mystery. Existence already was a mystery, before people of faith further deepened it, and solving a mystery with a mystery is no solution."
Andrew Zwicker	1964–	Physicist at the Princeton Plasma Physics Laboratory and a member of the New Jersey General Assembly	16th Legislative District New Jersey General Assemblyman	"I'm an atheist, but I don't believe that science and religion are by definition incompatible."

== See also ==
- Atheism in the United States
