= Judith Hayes =

American author and columnist

- Born: Judith L. Hayes; 1945; Lakewood, Ohio
- Died: June 27, 2012 (aged 67); Valley Springs, California, U.S.
- Occupation: Writer
- Spouse: Mercer P. Hayes
- Children: Deborah and Robert Hayes
- Writing career
- Period: 1975–2010
- Subjects: Secular humanism, religion, essays
- Notable works: In God We Trust: But Which One?; The Happy Heretic

Judith L. Hayes (1945–2012) was an American author and secular humanist columnist. She is best known for her book, The Happy Heretic, and she also operated a humanist website by the same name. Her work has appeared in numerous publications including Free Inquiry, Skeptical Inquirer, Freethought Today, Humanist in Canada, American Rationalist, and Secular Humanist Bulletin.

== Early life and education ==
Hayes was born in Lakewood, Ohio, and raised as a Christian. She spent the first 20 years of her life as a Missouri Synod Lutheran before, as she explains, she "literally reasoned my faith out of existence." She moved with her family to Oakland, California as a child in the early 1950s.

== Writing ==
Hayes was a secular humanist writer with three published books, and whose work has appeared in "Free Inquiry", "Skeptical Inquirer", "Humanist in Canada", "American Rationalist", and "Secular Humanist Bulletin". She was also a frequent contributor to the Secular Web.

In 1994 through 1996, Hayes was a regular columnist in Freethought Today, the newspaper published by the Freedom From Religion Foundation in Madison, Wisconsin. One of her columns, titled The Old Rugged Cross, was chosen to be included in the Social Issues Resources Series (SIRS) Renaissance database of articles on the arts, literature and the humanities. SIRS is a reference service for libraries and schools throughout the world.

In November 1996, Hayes inaugurated a monthly online column, "The Happy Heretic," sponsored by the Internet Infidels on the Secular Web. Beginning in 1997 Hayes began hosting it on her own domain.

In 1997, Hayes was senior writer for The American Rationalist.

- In God We Trust: But Which One? - Freedom From Religion Foundation, 1996; ISBN 9781877733116
- The Happy Heretic - Prometheus Books, 2000; ISBN 9781573928021

== Personal ==
She most recently resided for 25 years with her husband in Valley Springs, California. She had two children from her first marriage in 1962. In 1973 Mrs. Hayes married Mercer P. Hayes, and they were together until his death in 2010. She loved poetry, photography and music, including Mozart and Elvis. Hayes was an outspoken atheist for more than 20 years, after having been raised Missouri Synod Lutheran. During that interim period between believing and not believing, she was a "closet" atheist.

Judith Hayes died on June 27, 2012, at the age of 67.
