= Thongor Fights the Pirates of Tarakus =

1970 novel by Lin Carter

- Cover art for the original edition.
- Author: Lin Carter
- Cover artist: Jeff Jones
- Language: English
- Series: Thongor series
- Genre: Fantasy
- Publisher: Berkley Medallion
- Publication date: 1970
- Publication place: United States
- Media type: Print (Paperback)
- Pages: 160
- Preceded by: Thongor at the End of Time
- Followed by: The Sword of Thongor

Thongor Fights the Pirates of Tarakus is a fantasy novel by American writer Lin Carter, the sixth book of his Thongor series set on the mythical continent of Lemuria. It was first published in paperback by Berkley Medallion in July 1970, and reprinted in June 1976. The first British edition was published in paperback by Tandem in August 1971, and reissued by Star in April 1979. The book has been translated into Japanese and French.

== Plot summary ==
Kashtar, ruler of the pirate city-state of Tarakus, joins forces with a wizard who has dabbled in the forbidden secrets of lost Nianga, among them, a ray that causes madness--"the Gray Death," as it is known to its victims. With it, Kashtar hopes to conquer all Lemuria, and incidentally escape having his realm absorbed into the growing empire of Patanga, ruled by the upstart barbarian conqueror Thongor.

After Kashtar takes the best ship in Patanga's fleet and captures Thongor's old friend Karm Karvus, Thongor determines to free him and gain intelligence by sneaking into Tarakus. Posing as a crewman of Barim Redbeard, the pirate captain who helped his son escape Kashtar in the previous volume, he suits deed to word, only to be separated from his allies before he can reach his goal. He has to continue on to his goal on his own.

As Thongor approaches the city, he meets Karm Karvus, who has escaped on his own along with an imprisoned princess, and learns the pirate invasion fleet has set out for Patanga. Fortunately, they are able to link up again with Barim's ship and infiltrate the fleet as originally intended. Taking the ship bearing the death ray, they turn it on the enemy's own vessels. Once Tarakus is defeated in battle, it is annexed to Thongor's empire.

The book includes a frontispiece map by the author of part of Lemuria and concludes with an "Author's Note."

== Setting ==
The Thongor series is Carter's premier entry in the Sword & Sorcery genre, representing a tribute to both the Conan series of Robert E. Howard and the Barsoom novels of Edgar Rice Burroughs. He pictures the lost continent of Lemuria as a prehistoric kingdom located in the Pacific Ocean during the Ice Age, where Mesozoic wildlife persisted after the cataclysm wiped them out elsewhere. An intelligent reptilian humanoid race descended from dinosaur reigned supreme as the dominant life form but was partially supplanted by humanity as the continent was colonized by fauna from outside Lemuria. Humans have gradually thrown off their subjection by the older civilization. Culturally, Lemuria is a mixture of civilization and barbarism but overall is precociously advanced over the outside world, boasting a magic-based technology that includes even flying machines. The Thongor books relate the struggle of the titular hero to unite the humans of Lemuria into a single empire and complete the overthrow of the "dragon kings".

== Reception ==
Robert M. Price writes "[t]he Lemurian books pulse with a color and vitality that we miss in many of Lin Carter's later works. ... Yet to his relative inexperience we may also lay the blame for certain inconsistencies and failures to reckon with the implications of what he has written." Among these he notes "Thongor eating dates from the East as if he were in Europe" and "hail[ing] from [Lemuria's] wintry North," when, with the continent "south of the Equator, it would get hotter the further north you went!"

The novel was also reviewed by Charlie Brown in Locus no. 64, September 30, 1970, and Ted Pauls in Locus no. 74, February 14, 1971.
