= The Wizard of Lemuria =

1965 novel by Lin Carter

- Cover art of the first edition.
- Author: Lin Carter
- Cover artist: Gray Morrow
- Language: English
- Series: Thongor series
- Genre: Fantasy
- Publisher: Ace Books
- Publication date: 1965
- Publication place: United States
- Media type: Print (Paperback)
- Preceded by: Young Thongor
- Followed by: Thongor of Lemuria

The Wizard of Lemuria is a fantasy novel by American writer Lin Carter, the first book of his Thongor series set on the fictional ancient lost continent of Lemuria. The author's first published novel, it was initially issued in paperback by Ace Books in 1965. The author afterwards revised and expanded the text, in which form it was reissued as Thongor and the Wizard of Lemuria, first published in paperback by Berkley Books in 1969. This retitled and revised edition became the standard edition for later reprintings. The novel was also adapted into comic form, appearing in eight issues of Marvel's Creatures on the Loose.

== Plot and storyline ==
Cover art from the first edition of the retitled and revised version, Berkley Books, 1969.

The tale of Thongor of Valkarth, barbarian warrior in the prehistoric continent of Lemuria, who becomes humanity's champion in their pivotal struggle against the Dragon Kings who had previously dominated the world. As the serpent men devise a plan in restoring their empire, all that stands in their way are the courage of Thongor, his comrades, and the magic of the wizard Sharajsha.

== Setting ==
Map of Lemuria by Lin Carter

Map of Patanga, "City of the Flame", by Lin Carter

The Thongor series is Carter's prime entry in the Sword & Sorcery genre, serving as a tribute for both the Conan series by Robert E. Howard and the Barsoom novels of Edgar Rice Burroughs. He pictures the lost continent of Lemuria as a prehistoric kingdom located in the Pacific Ocean during the ice age, where Mesozoic wildlife persisted after a cataclysm wiped them out from the rest of the world. An intelligent race of reptilian humanoids, which evolved from dinosaurs, once reigned supreme over Lemuria in a vast empire, before being driven off by barbarian tribes who invaded the continent via a land bridge. Culturally, Lemuria is a mixture of civilization and barbarism. However, the human inhabitants have advanced beyond a Bronze Age level, boasting magic-based technology which even includes flying machines. The Thongor series relate the struggle of the titular protagonist as he unites the various tribes into a single army and complete his overthrow of the "dragon kings".

== Reception ==
Robert M. Price writes "[t]he Lemurian books pulse with a color and vitality that we miss in many of Lin Carter's later works. ... Yet to his relative inexperience we may also lay the blame for certain inconsistencies and failures to reckon with the implications of what he has written." Among these he notes "Thongor eating dates from the East as if he were in Europe" and "hail[ing] from [Lemuria's] wintry North," when, with the continent "south of the Equator, it would get hotter the further north you went!"

The novel was also reviewed separately by Archie Mercer and Harry Harrison in Amra v. 2, no. 36, September 1965, J. Cawthorn in New Worlds SF, February 1966, Charlie Brown in Locus no. 44, December 17, 1969, and Richard P. Brisson in Sword & Fantasy no. 8, October 2006.
