= Elie A. Shneour =

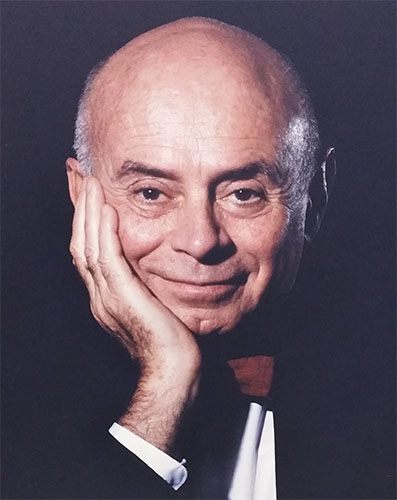
Photo of Elie Shneour

Elie Alexis Shneour (December 11, 1925, in Neuilly-sur-Seine − April 14, 2015, in La Jolla) was a French-born American neurochemist, biophysicist and author.

== Early life ==
Shneour was born in France into a Jewish family, the son of Zalman Shneour (Shneur) and Salomea (née Landau). His father, a known Yiddish and Hebrew poet and writer (later, recipient of the 1955 Israel Prize), emigrated from Czarist Russia in the early 1900s. His mother was from Poland. Elie had one sibling, sister Renée Rebecca, who later became Spanish dancer Laura Toledo.

After the Fall of France, Shneour and his family escaped to Spain at the insistence of his mother, while his father (who was educated in Germany and spent World War I in Berlin, working in a hospital) could not believe the impending catastrophe was actually happening. The family left Spain, and arrived at Ellis Island in New York in 1941. Shneour and his sister attended Cherry Lawn School in Darien, Connecticut. Upon naturalization in 1944 and after graduation, Shneour joined the US Army and was deployed to western Europe to battle the Nazis.

Shneour attended undergraduate school at Bard College in New York, where he received his bachelor's degree in biology in 1947. He then traveled to Berkeley, California, where he received his master's degree in biochemistry from the University of California, Berkeley, in 1955. While at Berkeley, Shneour met and married his first wife, Joan Brewster. They had two children, Mark Zalman and Alan Brewster.

== Career ==
Shneour received his PhD in biochemistry from UCLA in 1958. He started his career as an American Heart Association research fellow (from 1958 to 1962). He became research associate at the genetics department at Stanford University (1962–1965), later moving to associate professorship of biology and neuroscience at the University of Utah (1965–1969), where he received the Distinguished Teacher award.

Shneour contributed to research for Manned Orbiting Missions program at the American Institute of Biological Sciences and NASA (1966–1969). Between 1969 and 1971, he continued as a Research Neurochemist at the City of Hope National Medical Center.

In 1971, Shneour moved to La Jolla (San Diego), California, with his family, where he served for two years as director of research for Calbiochem (later acquired by Boehring.) In 1975, Shneour formed an independent advisory company, Biosystems Associates (later Biosystems Research Institutes), which he ran until his retirement in 2014.

Shneour served on a multitude of national and international scientific advisory bodies, and was a member of many notable scientific organizations in the fields of chemistry, biochemistry, molecular biology and neurochemistry.

== Writing ==
Shneour authored a number of books and articles on scientific matters and political discourse. He was a fellow of the Committee for Skeptical Inquiry since 1996, and an editorial board member of Skeptic Magazine from 1992 to 2008. A Christ myth theorist, Dr. Shneour authored a glowing review of Michael Paulkovich's book No Meek Messiah.

Addressing challenges and constraints faced by researchers, Shneour argued for a working consensus between scientists and bureaucracy in charge of funding, commenting that "It is not much of an exaggeration to suggest that had the present bureaucratic structure being in operation when poliomyelitis research was in its heyday, we might today have a compact, efficient, computer-operated portable iron lung rather than two vaccines."

Pondering CSICOP's role and objectives, Shneour reflected on the fact that "collectively we remain a series of small islands of rational thought in the vast ocean of scientific illiteracy." In CSICOP's 1998 feature article, he remarked that "skeptics should forego any thought of convincing the unconvinced that we hold the torch of truth illuminating the darkness. A more modest, realistic and achievable goal is to encourage the idea that one may be mistaken. Doubt is humbling and constructive; it leads to rational thought in weighing alternatives and fully reexamining options, and it opens unlimited vistas".

== Selected works ==
- Extraterrestrial Life: An Anthology and Bibliography (Editors: Elie A. Shneour and Eric A. Ottesen), Washington, National Academy of Sciences – NRC (National Research Council, publication no. 1296A), 1966
- Life Beyond Earth: A Vistas of Science Book by Samuel Moffat & Ellie A. Shneour, National Science Teachers Association, Scholastic Book Services, 1969
- The Malnourished Mind, Anchor Press, 1974 ISBN 9780385039093
