= Thongor of Lemuria =

1966 novel by Lin Carter

- Cover art for the original edition.
- Author: Lin Carter
- Illustrator: Gray Morrow
- Cover artist: Gray Morrow
- Language: English
- Series: Thongor series
- Genre: Fantasy
- Publisher: Ace Books
- Publication date: 1966
- Publication place: United States
- Media type: Print (Paperback)
- Pages: 127
- Preceded by: The Wizard of Lemuria
- Followed by: Thongor Against the Gods

Thongor of Lemuria is a fantasy novel by American writer Lin Carter, the second book of his Thongor series set on the mythical continent of Lemuria. It was first published in paperback by Ace Books in 1966. The author afterwards revised and expanded the text, in which form it was reissued as Thongor and the Dragon City, first published in paperback by Berkley Books in 1970. This retitled and revised edition became the standard edition for later reprintings.

== Plot and storyline ==
To rescue Princess Sumia and save her city, barbarian adventurer Thongor of Valkarth challenges the vampire-king Xothun, who has ruled the lost city of Omm for a thousand years.

Cover art from the first edition of the retitled and revised version, Thongor and the Dragon City, Berkley Books, 1970.

== Setting ==
The Thongor series is Carter's premier entry in the sword & sorcery genre, representing a tribute to both the Conan series of Robert E. Howard and the Barsoom novels of Edgar Rice Burroughs. He pictures the lost continent of Lemuria as a prehistoric kingdom located in the Pacific Ocean during the Ice Age, where Mesozoic wildlife persisted after the cataclysm wiped them out elsewhere. An intelligent reptilian humanoid race descended from the dinosaur reigned supreme as the dominant life form but was partially supplanted by humanity as the continent was colonized by fauna from outside Lemuria. Humans have gradually thrown off their subjection by the older civilization. Culturally, Lemuria is a mixture of civilization and barbarism but overall is precociously advanced over the outside world, boasting a magic-based technology that includes even flying machines. The Thongor books relate the struggle of the titular hero to unite the humans of Lemuria into a single empire and complete the overthrow of the "dragon kings".

== Influence ==
The Thongor books helped reestablish the sword and sorcery genre in the 1960s. Thongor was a successful ongoing series, paving the way for an explosion of similar works by other hands. It inspired such spin-offs as a comic book series and a rock group. After Carter was recruited by L. Sprague de Camp to assist in continuing Howard's original Conan series, however, his interest in Thongor waned. Ultimately the Thongor saga remained unfinished and was already out of print well before the author's death. As of September 2016, author and long-time friend of Lin Carter Dr. Robert M. Price released a collected edition of original Thongor stories with an introduction by Richard A. Lupoff. Price states, "In the last few years, I have taken up the fallen banner of Lin Carter's Thongor of Lemuria saga. Lin appointed me his literary executor, and so I feel that carrying on Thongor’s adventures is within my prerogative." Price has also informed Thongor fans on social media that he has planned more Thongor of Lemuria stories to come in the near future.

== Marvel Comics adaptation ==
The book was the basis for the beginning of a Marvel Comics storyline in the comic book Creatures on the Loose. Thongor debuted in issue 22 in March 1973, and the storyline ran through issue 29 in May 1974.

== Reception ==
Robert M. Price writes "[t]he Lemurian books pulse with a color and vitality that we miss in many of Lin Carter's later works. ... Yet to his relative inexperience we may also lay the blame for certain inconsistencies and failures to reckon with the implications of what he has written." Among these he notes "Thongor eating dates from the East as if he were in Europe" and "hail[ing] from [Lemuria's] wintry North," when, with the continent "south of the Equator, it would get hotter the further north you went!"

The novel was also reviewed by James Cawthorn in New Worlds, August 1966, L. Sprague de Camp in Amra v. 2, no. 42, September 1966, Chris Marler in Astral Dimensions no. 3, Spring 1976, and Richard P. Brisson in Sword & Fantasy no. 8, October 2006.
