= The Sword of Thongor =

2016 short story collection by Robert M. Price

- First edition
- Author: Robert M. Price
- Cover artist: Steve Lines
- Language: English
- Series: Thongor series
- Genre: Fantasy
- Publisher: Surinam Turtle Press
- Publication date: 2016
- Publication place: United States
- Media type: Print (paperback)
- Pages: 210 pp
- ISBN: 978-1-60543-906-8

The Sword of Thongor is a collection of fantasy short stories by American writer Robert M. Price, featuring Lin Carter's sword and sorcery hero Thongor of Valkarth. It was first published in trade paperback by Surinam Turtle Press in September 2016. Some of the pieces were originally published in magazines, the author's website, or the collection Young Thongor (Wildside Press, 2012); the remaining pieces are original to the present work.

The book collects ten tales by Price set throughout Thongor's career, some based on titles or outlines by Carter, together with an introduction by Richard A. Lupoff.

== Contents ==
- "The Price of a Barbarian - an Introduction" (Richard A. Lupoff)
- "The Creature in the Crypt" (from Young Thongor, 2012, based on a synopsis by Lin Carter; the de Camp/Carter Conan story "The Thing in the Crypt" was developed from the same plot)
- "Lost Gods of Lemuria"
- "Silver Shadows" (from Crypt of Cthulhu, no. 99, Lammas 1998, based on a title by Lin Carter)
- "Mind Lords of Lemuria" (from Young Thongor, 2012)
- "The Sword of Thongor"
- "Witch-Queen of Lemuria"
- "Spawn of the Fire Mist"
- "Vampires of Lemuria"
- "Thongor in the City of the Gods"
- "The Eleventh Scarlet Hell"
