= Thongor in the City of Magicians =

1968 novel by Lin Carter

- Cover art for the original edition.
- Author: Lin Carter
- Cover artist: Frank Frazetta
- Language: English
- Series: Thongor series
- Genre: Fantasy
- Publisher: Paperback Library
- Publication date: 1968
- Publication place: United States
- Media type: Print (Paperback)
- Pages: 160
- Preceded by: Thongor Against the Gods
- Followed by: Thongor at the End of Time

Thongor in the City of Magicians is a fantasy novel by American writer Lin Carter, the fourth book of his Thongor series set on the mythical continent of Lemuria. It was first published in paperback by Paperback Library in April 1968, and reissued by Warner Books in October 1979. The first British edition was published in paperback by Tandem in January 1970, and reprinted in March 1973. The book has been translated into Japanese and French.

== Plot summary ==
The eight survivors of the Nine Magicians of Zaar, whose colleague Adamancus was killed in the previous volume, cloak their Rmoahal henchmen in invisibility, enabling them to capture their nemesis Thongor. The Rmoahal take him to their castle to turn him over to their masters. He escapes into its catacombs where he destroys an ancient worm god, but is retaken by the Zaarians. Mardanax of Zaar then flies him on a pterodactyl to the city of magicians.

Thongor's ally, the exiled Rmoahal prince Shangoth, infiltrates the city to rescue him. The two manage to turn the tables on the magicians, reflecting their own spells against them. Only Mardanax escapes the slaughter.

The book includes a frontispiece map by the author of part of Lemuria.

== Setting ==
The Thongor series is Carter's premier entry in the Sword & Sorcery genre, representing a tribute to both the Conan series of Robert E. Howard and the Barsoom novels of Edgar Rice Burroughs. He pictures the lost continent of Lemuria as a prehistoric kingdom located in the Pacific Ocean during the Ice Age, where Mesozoic wildlife persisted after the cataclysm wiped them out elsewhere. An intelligent reptilian humanoid race descended from dinosaur reigned supreme as the dominant life form but was partially supplanted by humanity as the continent was colonized by fauna from outside Lemuria. Humans have gradually thrown off their subjection by the older civilization. Culturally, Lemuria is a mixture of civilization and barbarism but overall is precociously advanced over the outside world, boasting a magic-based technology that includes even flying machines. The Thongor books relate the struggle of the titular hero to unite the humans of Lemuria into a single empire and complete the overthrow of the "dragon kings".

== Reception ==
Robert M. Price writes "[t]he Lemurian books pulse with a color and vitality that we miss in many of Lin Carter's later works. ... Yet to his relative inexperience we may also lay the blame for certain inconsistencies and failures to reckon with the implications of what he has written." Among these he notes "Thongor eating dates from the East as if he were in Europe" and "hail[ing] from [Lemuria's] wintry North," when, with the continent "south of the Equator, it would get hotter the further north you went!"

The novel was also reviewed by Alma Jo Williams in Science Fiction & Fantasy Book Review, November 1979, and Richard P. Brisson in Sword & Fantasy no. 8, October 2006.
