= The Cthulhu Cycle: Thirteen Tentacles of Terror =

The Cthulhu Cycle: Thirteen Tentacles of Terror is a 1996 anthology edited by Robert M. Price.

== Plot summary ==
The Cthulhu Cycle: Thirteen Tentacles of Terror is an anthology of Lovecraft-adjacent horror stories. The anthology opens with Lord Dunsany's "A Shop in Go-By Street", and includes Lovecraft's own "Call of Cthulhu"—the cornerstone of the Cthulhu Mythos. The volume includes entries like Will Murray's "Black Fire", which ventures into the icy desolation of the Arctic to awaken buried terrors. C.J. Henderson's "Patiently Waiting" with fringe phenomena like crop circles. Each story is preceded by a brief biographical note, framing the author's contribution in the larger Lovecraftian tapestry.

== Reception ==
Jonathan Palmer reviewed The Cthulhu Cycle: Thirteen Tentacles of Terror for Arcane magazine, rating it a 9 out of 10 overall, and stated that "The editor’s introduction is illuminating and each writer's story is prefaced with a short biographical paragraph to indicate their place in the Lovecraftian scheme of things. This is still some of the best fantasy horror you can get - a recommended read for all lovers of horror. It's all here; the various authors cross-reference each other well, and frankly, there's not a single weak link in it."
