= Young Thongor =

Book by Lin Carter

- First edition
- Author: Lin Carter
- Cover artist: James Heffron
- Language: English
- Series: Thongor series
- Genre: Fantasy
- Published: 2012 (Wildside Press)
- Publication place: United States
- Media type: Print (paperback)
- Pages: 218
- ISBN: 978-1-4344-4101-0
- OCLC: 796935665
- Followed by: Thongor and the Wizard of Lemuria

Young Thongor is a collection of fantasy short stories by American writer Lin Carter, with additional material by Robert M. Price, edited and with a foreword by Adrian Cole. It was first published in trade paperback by Wildside Press in May, 2012. Most of the pieces were first published in magazines, anthologies or other books by Carter; the remaining pieces are original to the present work.

== Summary ==
The book collects most of the extant tales about the youth of the author's sword and sorcery hero Thongor of Valkarth. Carter had planned to gather these and other Thongor tales he never lived to write into two projected collections, to be titled Thongor of Lost Lemuria and Thongor in the Land of Peril. Additional Thongor stories written after Carter's death by his literary executor Robert Price were combined with the existing tales to fill out the existing book, though it omits at least one Price Thongor story, "Witch-Queen of Lemuria."

== Contents ==
- "Foreword" (Adrian Cole)
- "Lemuria" (Lin Carter, excerpted from the introduction to Thongor and the Dragon City, 1970)
- "Diombar's Song of the Last Battle" (poem) (Lin Carter, from Dreams from R'lyeh, 1975)
- "Black Hawk of Valkarth" (Lin Carter, from Fantastic Stories, Sep. 1974)
- "The City in the Jewel" (Lin Carter, from Fantastic Stories, Dec. 1975)
- "Demon of the Snows" (Lin Carter, from The Year's Best Fantasy Stories: 6, Nov. 1980)
- "The Creature in the Crypt" (Robert Price, from a synopsis by Lin Carter; the de Camp/Carter Conan story "The Thing in the Crypt" was developed from the same plot)
- "Mind Lords of Lemuria" (Robert Price)
- "Silver Shadows" (Robert Price, from a title by Lin Carter, from Crypt of Cthulhu, no. 99, Lammas 1998)
- "Keeper of the Emerald Flame" (Lin Carter, from The Mighty Swordsmen, Dec. 1970)
- "Black Moonlight" (Lin Carter, from Fantastic Stories, Nov. 1976; the de Camp/Carter Conan story "The Gem in the Tower" was a rewritten version of this story)
- "Thieves of Zangabal" (Lin Carter, from The Mighty Barbarians, 1969)
- "About the Contributors"
