= Thongor Against the Gods =

1967 fantasy novel by Lin Carter

- Cover art for the original edition.
- Author: Lin Carter
- Cover artist: Frank Frazetta
- Language: English
- Series: Thongor series
- Genre: Fantasy
- Publisher: Paperback Library
- Publication date: 1967
- Publication place: United States
- Media type: Print (Paperback)
- Pages: 157
- Preceded by: Thongor of Lemuria
- Followed by: Thongor in the City of Magicians

Thongor Against the Gods is a fantasy novel by American writer Lin Carter, the third book of his Thongor series set on the mythical continent of Lemuria. It was first published in paperback by Paperback Library in November 1967, and reissued by Warner Books in August 1979. The first British edition was published in paperback by Tandem in 1970, and reprinted in March 1973. An ebook edition was issued by Wildside Press in July 2015. The book has been translated into Japanese and French.

== Plot summary ==
The Druids of Yamath, defeated in the previous volume, plot with the Sarks of Shembis and Tsargol to destroy their mutual enemy Thongor of Valkarth and restore their dominion. They resolve to have his beloved, Sumia of Patanga, abducted by assassin Zandar Zan, using her to lure Thongor into a trap.

The scheme goes awry; Sumia falls into the sea from Zandar's airboat, and is rescued by exiled Rmoahal tribesman Shangoth, while Zandar himself, fleeing from the pursuing Thongor, crashes into a mountain. Fearing both dead, Thongor exits his own airboat to search for them, only to have Zandar, who has survived, steal it.

The stranded Thongor happens on Shangoth's father, the Rmoahal chieftain, being tortured by the shaman who exiled them, and rescues him. Meanwhile, Sumia and Shangoth are taken captive by Adamancus, one of the Nine Magicians of Zaar who are the secret power behind the Yamath Druids.

Thongor overtakes Zandar Zan, who falls to his doom from the airboat. In the recovered boat, Thongor arrives at Adamancus's lair in time to save Sumia and Shangoth from being sacrificed to a devil the magician has summoned.

With the Rmoahals' aid he goes on to defeat the combined forces of Shembis and Tsargol, which then become part of his empire.

== Setting ==
The Thongor series is Carter's premier entry in the Sword & Sorcery genre, representing a tribute to both the Conan series of Robert E. Howard and the Barsoom novels of Edgar Rice Burroughs. He pictures the lost continent of Lemuria as a prehistoric kingdom located in the Pacific Ocean during the Ice Age, where Mesozoic wildlife persisted after the cataclysm wiped them out elsewhere. An intelligent reptilian humanoid race descended from dinosaur reigned supreme as the dominant life form but was partially supplanted by humanity as the continent was colonized by fauna from outside Lemuria. Humans have gradually thrown off their subjection by the older civilization. Culturally, Lemuria is a mixture of civilization and barbarism but overall is precociously advanced over the outside world, boasting a magic-based technology that includes even flying machines. The Thongor books relate the struggle of the titular hero to unite the humans of Lemuria into a single empire and complete the overthrow of the "dragon kings".

== Reception ==
Robert M. Price writes "[t]he Lemurian books pulse with a color and vitality that we miss in many of Lin Carter's later works. ... Yet to his relative inexperience we may also lay the blame for certain inconsistencies and failures to reckon with the implications of what he has written." Among these he notes "Thongor eating dates from the East as if he were in Europe" and "hail[ing] from [Lemuria's] wintry North," when, with the continent "south of the Equator, it would get hotter the further north you went!"

The novel was also reviewed by Mark Buckmaster in Science Fiction & Fantasy Book Review, November 1979, and Richard P. Brisson in Sword & Fantasy no. 8, October 2006.
