= William R. Harwood =

American scientist and author

- Education: University of Calgary (BEd, MA); University of Cambridge (MLitt); Columbia Pacific University (PhD)
- Occupation: Author

William R. Harwood is an American author, contributor to Skeptical Inquirer, Free Inquiry, and contributing editor to the American Rationalist. He is the author of 40 books, four novels, as well as over 600 articles and book reviews for periodicals in nine countries.

He obtained his B.Ed. and M.A from the University of Calgary in 1972 and 1974, M.Litt. from the University of Cambridge in 1979, and Ph.D. from Columbia Pacific University in 1983.

== Books ==
- God, Jesus and the Bible: The Origin and Evolution of Religion
- The Disinformation Cycle
- The Fully Translated Bible (ed/tr)
- Dictionary of Contemporary Mythology
- Mythology’s Last Gods: Yahweh and Jesus (Prometheus, 1992)
- Complete Proof That the Earth is Flat – Or That the Bible is Fiction: There is No Third Alternative
