= Zalman Shneour =

Jewish (Hebrew and Yiddish) author (1887–1959)

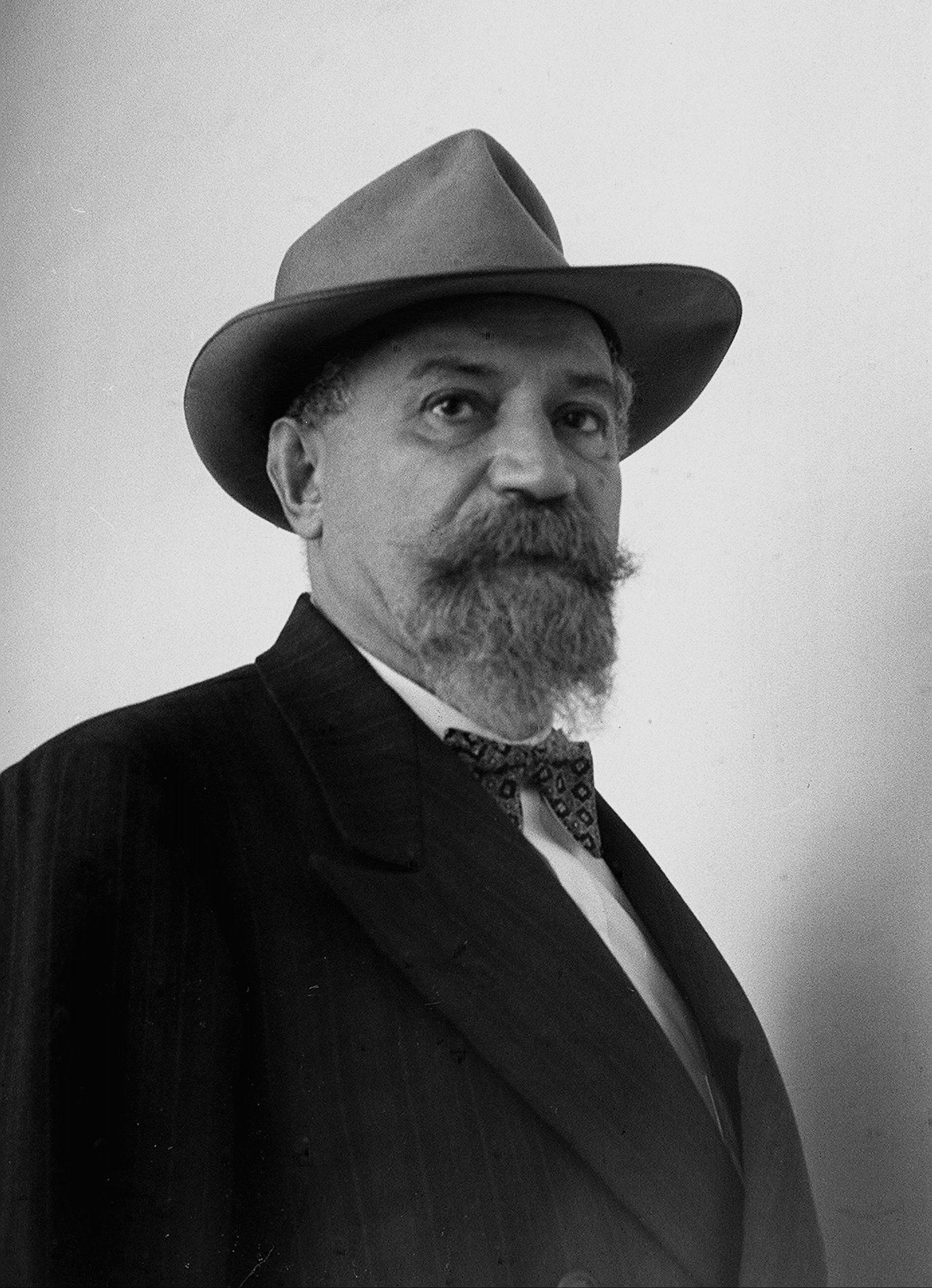
- Shneour in 1949
- Native name: זלמן שניאור
- Born: 1887 Shklow, Mogilev Uyezd, Mogilev Governorate, Russian Empire
- Died: 20 February 1959 (aged 71–72) New York City, U.S.
- Occupation: Poet, writer
- Language: Yiddish, Hebrew

Zalman Shneour (Yiddish: זלמן שניאור; born Shneur Zalkind; 1887 – 20 February 1959) was a prolific Yiddish and Hebrew poet and writer. In 1955, he was nominated for the Nobel Prize in Literature.

== Biography ==
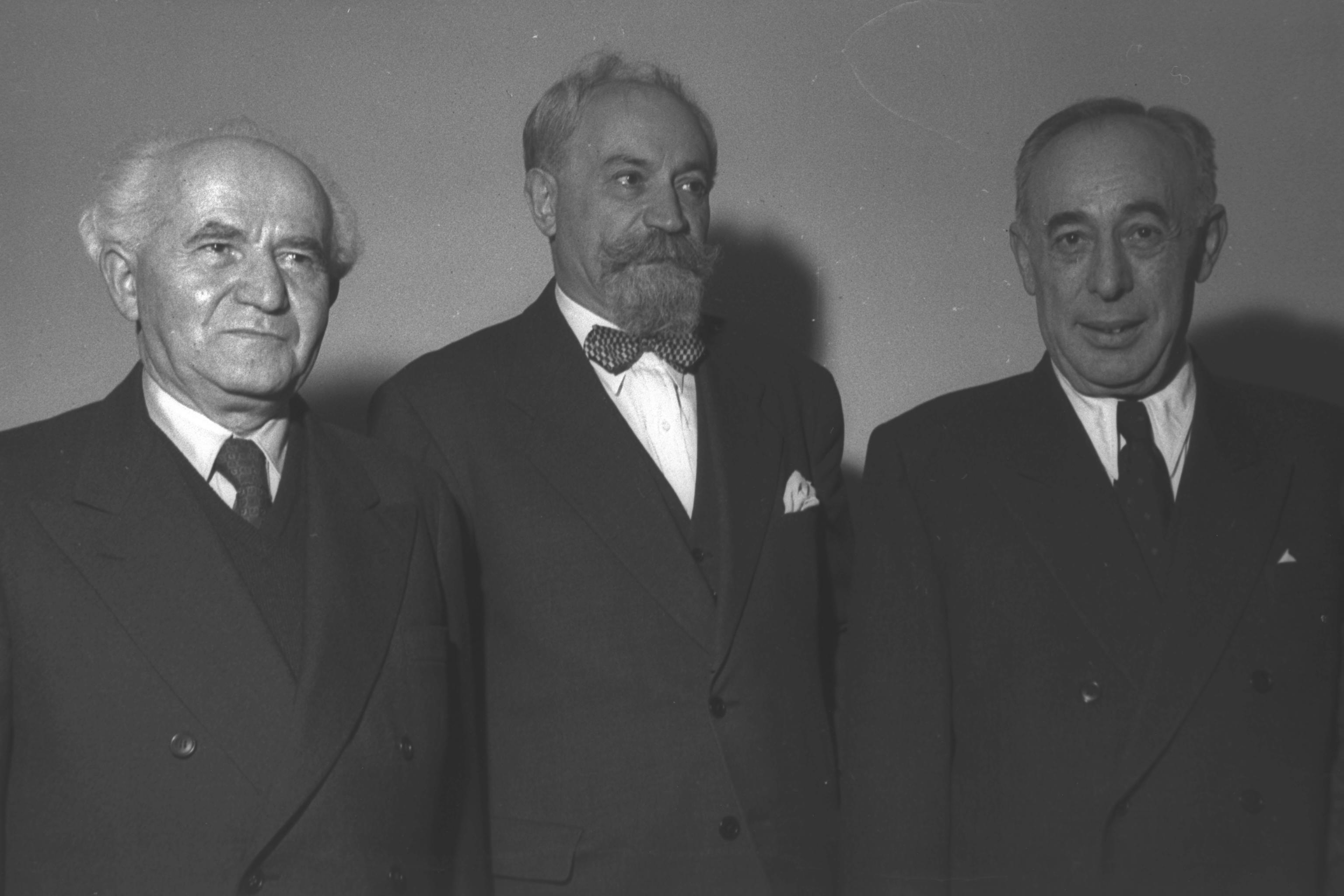
Zalman Shneor at the 1952 Bialik Prize award ceremony. To his left stands Prime Minister David Ben-Gurion, and to his right is Israel Rokach, mayor of Tel-Aviv

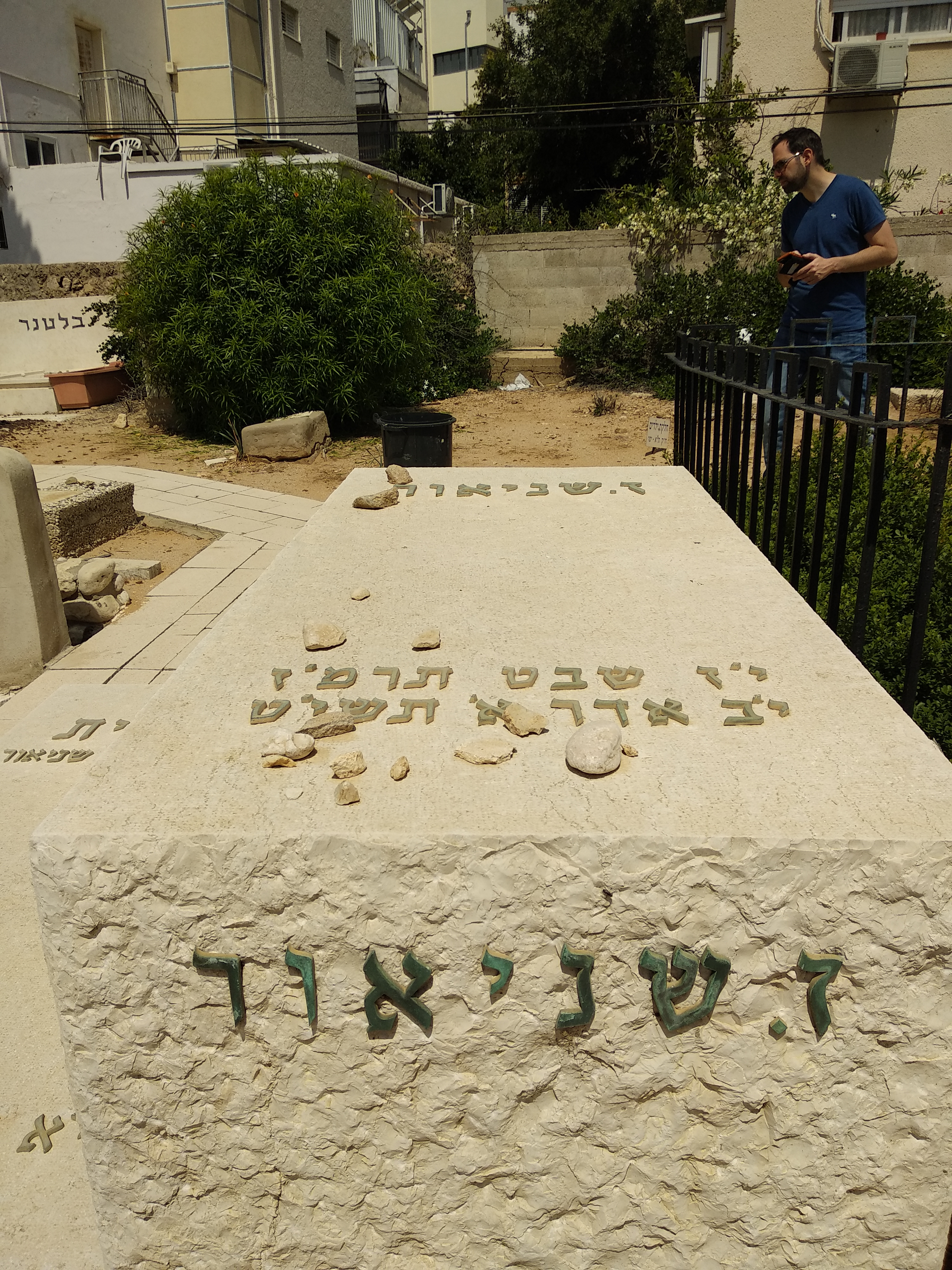
Grave of Zalman Shneor, Trumpeldor Cemetery, Tel Aviv

Zalman Shneour was born in Shklow, Russian Empire (now in Belarus) in 1887. His parents were Isaac Zalkind and Feiga Sussman. At age 13, he left for Odessa, the center of literature and Zionism during this time. Shneour moved to Warsaw in 1902 and was hired by a successful publishing house. He moved to Vilnius in 1904, where he published his first book and a collection of stories.

In 1907, Shneour moved to Paris to study Natural Sciences, Philosophy, and Literature, at the Sorbonne. He traveled throughout Europe from 1908 to 1913 and visited North Africa. When World War I erupted, Shneour was in Berlin where the Germans detained him as a Russian citizen. There he wrote his famous Hebrew epic, Vilna, a poetic reconstruction of bygone Jewish life. During the war, he worked in a hospital and studied at the University of Berlin. Shneour returned to Paris in 1923. He stayed there until 1940, when Hitler's troops invaded France. Shneour then fled to Spain, and from there he went to New York City in 1941. He immigrated to Israel in 1951.

Shneour died in 1959 in New York.

He is also remembered as an author of Yiddish song “Tra-la-la-la,” known as Margaritkelekh, Daisies. Artists such as Chava Alberstein have recorded it.

Shneour had two children: the American neurochemist and biophysicist Elie A. Shneour, and Renée Rebecca, who became the Spanish dancer Laura Toledo.

== Published works ==
Translations to English

- Song of the Dnieper, translated by Joseph Leftwich. Roy Publishers: New York, 1945.
- Restless spirit: Selected Writings of Zalman Shneour, translated by Moshe Spiegel. Thomas Yoseloff: New York, 1963.
- A Death: Notes of a Suicide, translated by Daniel Kennedy. Wakefield Press: Cambridge, 2019. ISBN 9781939663450.

Translations to Russian

- The Emperor and the Rebbe (Император и ребе, קײסער און רבי), translated to Russian in 2018 (ISBN 978-5-9953-0512-5)
- Шкловцы (שקלאָװער ייִדן). Книжники, 2012
- Дядя Зяма (פֿעטער זשאָמע). Книжники, 2014

== Awards and recognition ==
- 1951, the Bialik Prize for Literature
- 1955, the Israel Prize for literature

== See also ==
- List of Bialik Prize recipients
- List of Israel Prize recipients
- Hebrew literature
- Yiddish literature
