= Thongor at the End of Time =

1968 novel by Lin Carter

- Cover art for the original edition.
- Author: Lin Carter
- Cover artist: Jeff Jones
- Language: English
- Series: Thongor series
- Genre: Fantasy
- Publisher: Paperback Library
- Publication date: 1968
- Publication place: United States
- Media type: Print (Paperback)
- Pages: 158
- Preceded by: Thongor in the City of Magicians
- Followed by: Thongor Fights the Pirates of Tarakus

Thongor at the End of Time is a fantasy novel by American writer Lin Carter, the fifth book of his Thongor series set on the mythical continent of Lemuria. It was first published in paperback by Paperback Library in October 1968, and reissued by Warner Books in December 1978. The first British edition was published in paperback by Tandem in July 1970, and reprinted in March 1973. The book has been translated into Japanese and French.

== Plot summary ==
Seeking vengeance on his enemy, evil magician Mardanax of Zaar, infiltrates Patanga, capital city of Thongor's growing Lemurian empire. He succeeds in striking Thongor down and drugging his wife Queen Sumia into pliability. Under Mardanax's sway she agrees to wed the nobleman the Zaarian has marked out to be his puppet ruler.

The young officer Charn Thovis, fearing for the safety of Thongor and Sumia's young son Thar, spirits the prince away, but a giant flying lizard forces their airboat down and the two fall into the hands of Barim Redbeard's pirates from the rogue city-state of Tarakus. Concealing their identities, the two at first are able to join the crew, but Thar is soon found out and taken hostage by the pirate king Kashtar.

Meanwhile, Thongor's spirit-form passes through a gloomy netherworld, receiving messages regarding his destiny, culminating in a personal encounter with Father Gorm, chief of the Nineteen Gods, who tells him how he has been marked for greatness and must return to the world of the living to complete his work. He is granted visions of a future extending from his own impending conquest of the whole continent through several cataclysms in which the civilization of Lemuria is succeeded by that of Atlantis, and ultimately, "at the end of time," early Egypt. The culmination of his historical vision is thus the beginning of our own recorded history. The author implies that Robert E. Howard's Hyborian Age and its premier hero Conan the Barbarian fits into this grand panorama.

In Tarakus, Charn and Thar's shipmates help them escape and return to Patanga to prevent Sumia's forced wedding. Their airboat crashes the ceremony, and the machinations of Mardanax are exposed as Thongor leaps from his coffin and dispatches him.

The book includes a frontispiece map by the author of "Patanga, City of the Flame" and a semifictional appendix on "The Source of the Lemurian Mythos" in which he claims to have derived the overall storyline of the Thongor books from a translation of the rare Indian scriptures known as the Upa-Puranas in combination with some of Helena Blavatsky's Theosophic notions of prehistorical races. The Blavatsky derivation is accurate, but the Upa-Puranas were made up by Carter, and do not in fact exist.

== Setting ==
The Thongor series is Carter's premier entry in the Sword & Sorcery genre, representing a tribute to both the Conan series of Robert E. Howard and the Barsoom novels of Edgar Rice Burroughs. He pictures the lost continent of Lemuria as a prehistoric kingdom located in the Pacific Ocean during the Ice Age, where Mesozoic wildlife persisted after the cataclysm wiped them out elsewhere. An intelligent reptilian humanoid race descended from dinosaur reigned supreme as the dominant life form but was partially supplanted by humanity as the continent was colonized by fauna from outside Lemuria. Humans have gradually thrown off their subjection by the older civilization. Culturally, Lemuria is a mixture of civilization and barbarism but overall is precociously advanced over the outside world, boasting a magic-based technology that includes even flying machines. The Thongor books relate the struggle of the titular hero to unite the humans of Lemuria into a single empire and complete the overthrow of the "dragon kings".

== Reception ==
Robert M. Price writes "[t]he Lemurian books pulse with a color and vitality that we miss in many of Lin Carter's later works. ... Yet to his relative inexperience we may also lay the blame for certain inconsistencies and failures to reckon with the implications of what he has written." Among these he notes "Thongor eating dates from the East as if he were in Europe" and "hail[ing] from [Lemuria's] wintry North," when, with the continent "south of the Equator, it would get hotter the further north you went!"
