= The American Rationalist =

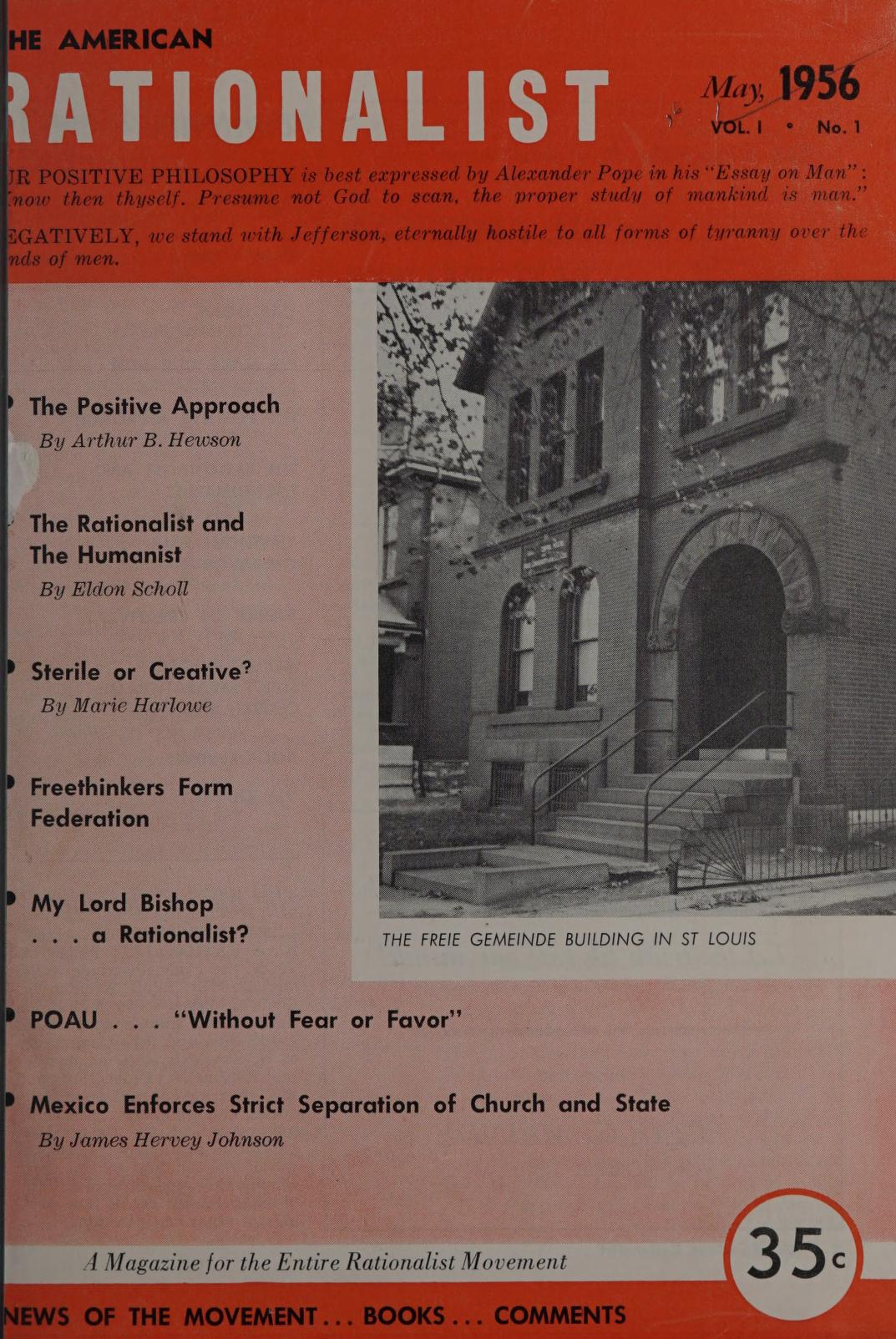
- Cover of the first issue, May 1956
- Discipline: Rationalism
- Language: English
- Edited by: S. T. Joshi

Publication details
- History: 1956–2018
- Publisher: Center for Inquiry (Amherst NY, United States)
- Frequency: bi-monthly

Standard abbreviations
- ISO 4: Am. Ration.

Indexing
- ISSN: 0003-0708
- OCLC no.: 3966585

Links
- blog

The American Rationalist is a bi-monthly journal of secular humanist opinion and commentary published by the Center for Inquiry. S. T. Joshi is the current editor and writes the "Stupidity Watch" column for the journal.

Feature articles cover a wide range of topics from a freethought viewpoint including science and religion, separation of church and state, and applied philosophy. Regular contributors include well-known scholars in the fields of science and philosophy.

== Notable columnists ==
Regular columnists include:

- Robert M. Price
- William R. Harwood
- S. T. Joshi
- Michael Paulkovich
