= Mysteries of the Worm (anthology) =

Mysteries of the Worm is a 1981 fiction anthology by Robert Bloch.

== Contents ==
Mysteries of the Worm is an anthology in which the short stories were written by Robert Bloch.

== Publication history ==
Shannon Appelcline noted that when Chaosium started publishing fiction, "Most of the early Cthulhu books were overseen by Robert M. Price, the editor of the long running 'zine Crypt of Cthulhu. His first book was The Hastur Cycle (1993), a collection of short stories which traced the development of a single Lovecraftian element, here Hastur. It was followed by Mysteries of the Worm (1993), a collection of Robert Bloch's Mythos fiction."

== Reception ==
Aaron Voss reviewed Mysteries of the Worm in White Wolf Inphobia #53 (March, 1995), rating it a 3 out of 5 and stated that "This book is a must-have for any collector of Cthulhu mythos. It's an excellent collection of horror fiction; some of its stories have delighted fans for more than 50 years."

== Reviews ==
- Review by Alma Jo Williams (1982) in Science Fiction Review, Summer 1982
- Review by S. T. Joshi (1994) in Lovecraft Studies, #30 Spring 1994
- Review by Gahan Wilson (1995) in Realms of Fantasy, February 1995
