= Journal of Fire Sciences =

- Discipline: Engineering, materials science
- Language: English
- Edited by: Alexander B. Morgan

Publication details
- History: 1983-present
- Publisher: SAGE Publications
- Frequency: Bimonthly
- Impact factor: 1.694 (2020)

Standard abbreviations
- ISO 4: J. Fire Sci.

Indexing
- CODEN: JFSCDV
- ISSN: 0734-9041 (print); 1530-8049 (web)
- LCCN: 83643900
- OCLC no.: 8822978

Links
- Journal homepage; Online access; Online archive

The Journal of Fire Sciences is a bimonthly peer-reviewed scientific journal that covers the fields of engineering and materials science as applied to fire prevention. The editor-in-chief is Alexander B. Morgan. It was established in 1983 and is published by SAGE Publications.

== Abstracting and indexing ==
The journal is abstracted and indexed in Scopus and the Science Citation Index Expanded. According to the Journal Citation Reports, its 2020 impact factor is 1.694, ranking it 57th out of 91 journals in the category "Engineering, Multidisciplinary" and 269th out of 334 journals in the category "Materials Science, Multidisciplinary".
