= Michael B. Paulkovich =

American columnist (born 1955)

- Born: February 21, 1955 (age 71); Washington, D.C., U.S.
- Education: University of Maryland (BS)
- Occupations: Author, editor, systems engineer
- Website: beyond.to/mbp/mbp.htm

Michael B. Paulkovich (born February 21, 1955) is a columnist for American Atheist Magazine, a print and online resource for atheism, religion and politics. He is also a frequent contributor to Free Inquiry and contributing editor for The American Rationalist. Paulkovich is an inventor, editor, and space systems engineer for NASA.

== Early life ==
Paulkovich was born in Washington, D.C. and grew up in Montgomery County, Maryland. He completed his Bachelor of Science in Engineering at the University of Maryland. While in college, Paulkovich developed his first invention, the melodic telephone ringer and published it in Popular Electronics.

== Career ==
While at NASA he contributed to the Cassini–Huygens mission, the CONTOUR spacecraft, and development of the James Webb Space Telescope. In 2011 he was asked to be columnist for American Atheist Magazine, and then contributing editor for The American Rationalist. He has written for Humanist Perspectives magazine, Popular Electronics , Journal of Applied Fire Science, and Science.

== Books ==
- God and Horrendous Suffering (co-author) (Denver: GCRR Press, 2021)
- Mostly Harmful: 1001 Things Everyone Should Know About Religion (Annapolis: Spillix, 2020)
- Beyond the Crusades: Christianity's Lies, Laws and Legacy with foreword by Robert M. Price (Cranford: American Atheist Press, 2016)
- Filling the Void: A Selection of Humanist and Atheist Poetry (co-author) (Onus Books, 2016)
- No Meek Messiah (Annapolis: Spillix, 2012)

== Controversies ==
Candida Moss joined with Joel Baden to write an article in the Daily Beast about Paulkovich's No Meek Messiah book, but other writers have pointed out that their article has many errors: the claim that Paulkovich had no web presence, and no Twitter account, that he claimed to be a “Bible Scholar” and that there is no biographical information on him. It has been suggested that Moss and Baden never had Paulkovich's book in their possession; one writer asked, "Did anyone who wrote about No Meek Messiah ever read it? I don’t think so. Or if they did they hid their guilt well from the public."

In their Daily Beast article, Moss and Baden suggested that consuls, generals, kings and emperors do not write, yet Moss and Baden seem unaware of Paulkovich's appendix citing many who were prolific authors (e.g. Moss and Baden mention Vardanes and Tiberius; Paulkovich cited the publications of those men in his appendix on pages 347 and 348 of No Meek Messiah.) Moss and Baden also claimed that one of the 126 sources Paulkovich cited who should have written about Jesus (Asclepiades) actually lived 100 years before Jesus, but they referenced the wrong Asclepiades (even linking to the wrong man at Wikipedia from their Daily Beast article), seemingly unaware of Paulkovich's references and appendix – there were over 40 men of that name in ancient Prusa, Bithynia and Paulkovich referred to the Asclepiades who lived during Hadrian, late first century.

Michael Sherlock, now executive director of Atheist Alliance International also critiqued Paulkovich's work, writing that Paulkovich "made a fundamental mistake with regards to the alleged reference to Jesus in one of Josephus’ works" but later admitted his error, and that he had never read Paulkovich's work; he published an apology stating "the error rests with the sloppy journalism of Jonathan Vankin and not with the precise research of Michael Paulkovich."

Paulkovich's subsequent book, Beyond the Crusades: Christianity's Lies, Laws and Legacy is a complete re-write of No Meek Messiah with a new publisher, and foreword by New Testament scholar Robert M. Price. The author has suggested that readers consider this version as it supersedes the earlier work.

== See also ==
- American Rationalist
- American Atheist Magazine
- Free Inquiry magazine
- Christ myth theory
- Historicity of Jesus
- September 11 attacks
- National Fire Protection Association
- Journal of Fire Sciences
