= The Hastur Cycle =

The Hastur Cycle is a 1993 fiction anthology published by Chaosium.

== Contents ==
The Hastur Cycle is an anthology in which short stories explore the mythology of Hastur.

== Publication history ==
Shannon Appelcline noted that when Chaosium started publishing fiction, "Most of the early Cthulhu books were overseen by Robert M. Price, the editor of the long running 'zine Crypt of Cthulhu. His first book was The Hastur Cycle (1993), a collection of short stories which traced the development of a single Lovecraftian element, here Hastur."

== Reception ==
Aaron "The Assassin" Voss reviewed The Hastur Cycle in White Wolf Inphobia #51 (Jan., 1995), rating it a 3.5 out of 5 and stated that "was the first part of a series about Lovecraftian mythology from Chaosium, including stories that are out of print or hard to find."

== Reviews ==
- Review by S. T. Joshi (1994) in Lovecraft Studies, #30 Spring 1994
- Review by Gahan Wilson (1995) in Realms of Fantasy, February 1995
- Review by Paul Di Filippo (1997) in Asimov's Science Fiction, December 1997
- Review by David Lee Stone [as by David L. Stone] (1998) in Interzone, #132 June 1998
