= Internet Infidels =

American nonprofit (1995-)

- Logo of Internet Infidels
- Established: 1995 (31 years ago)
- Types: nonprofit organization, educational organization, atheist organization
- Tax ID no.: EIN 841412395
- Legal status: nonprofit corporation, 501(c)(3) organization
- Headquarters: Colorado Springs, Las Vegas
- Country: United States
- Revenue: 37,191 United States dollar (2021)
- Total Assets: 36,121 United States dollar (2021)
- Website: www.infidels.org

Internet Infidels, Inc. is an American nonprofit educational organization founded in 1995 by Jeffery Jay Lowder and Brett Lemoine. Its mission is to use the Internet to promote a view that supernatural forces or entities do not exist (metaphysical naturalism). Internet Infidels maintains a website of educational resources about agnosticism, atheism, freethought, humanism, secularism, and other nontheistic viewpoints particularly relevant to nonbelievers and skeptics of the paranormal. Relevant resources include rebuttals to arguments made by religious apologists and theistic philosophers, transcripts of debates between believers and nonbelievers, and responses from opponents of a naturalistic worldview. The site has been referred to by one of its critics, Christian apologist Gary Habermas, as "one of the Internet's main Web sites for skeptics", and by skeptical physicist Taner Edis as "a major Web site serving nonbelievers". Its tagline is "a drop of reason in a pool of confusion".

== Mission ==
Richard Carrier, former editor-in-chief, said that "the mission of the Internet Infidels has always been to defend and promote Metaphysical Naturalism". The organization formally adopts agnostic philosopher Paul Draper's definition of metaphysical naturalism as "the hypothesis that the natural world is a closed system, which means that nothing that is not a part of the natural world affects it. ... [This] implies that there are no supernatural entities, or at least none that actually exercises its power to affect the natural world." Internet Infidels aims to inform readers that similar views have been adopted around the world and across historical eras, to make hard-to-find information more easily available, and to encourage those who profess belief to review all of the arguments and evidence and come to their own conclusions.

== Secular Web ==
Logo of the Secular Web, the primary product of Internet Infidels

The primary product of Internet Infidels is the Secular Web website, infidels.org. Its Modern Library section includes contemporary articles (1970–present) offering arguments that all religions are false (particularly Christianity, Mormonism, Islam, Judaism, and Hinduism), arguments against the existence of God, critiques of arguments for the existence of God, and arguments for metaphysical naturalism. A series of written debates between prominent theistic and nontheistic philosophers covering these issues and available in the Modern Library is titled "God or Blind Nature? Philosophers Debate the Evidence".

The Secular Web also includes a section containing historical works critical of religion by Voltaire, Thomas Jefferson, Thomas Paine, Mark Twain, Bertrand Russell, and Albert Einstein.

The Secular Web Kiosk section features short, informal articles. These general interest articles include editorials, book reviews, commentary on social issues or public policy, satire, and fiction, among other things.

Bruce B. Lawrence, the Nancy and Jeffrey Marcus Humanities Professor of Religion at Duke University, described the site as "hard to top" for "thoughtful material, extensive networking, and interdisciplinary flair."

== IIDB ==
Until 2008 Internet Infidels hosted a discussion board, IIDB (Internet Infidels Discussion Board), but during 2008 IIDB was transferred to a new site, Freethought and Rationalism Discussion Board (FRDB). Both of those sites were eventually archived as FRDB became Talk Freethought in 2014. Talk Freethought continues in the tradition of IIDB and FRDB, hosting discussions on a number of subjects including philosophy, science, politics and of course, religion.
