= Robert M. Price =

American biblical scholar (born 1954)

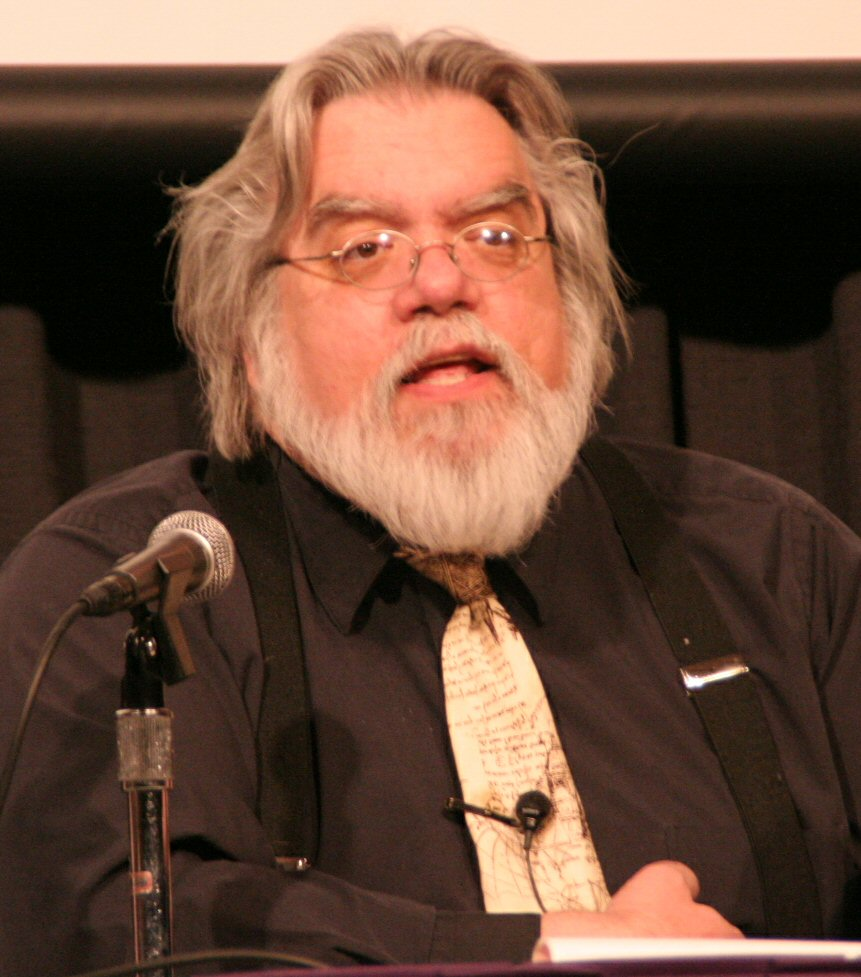
- Born: July 7, 1954 (age 72); Jackson, Mississippi, U.S.
- Education: Montclair State University (BA); Gordon–Conwell Theological Seminary (MTS); Drew University (PhD, PhD)
- Occupation: Theologian
- Known for: Christ myth theory
- Political party: Republican
- Spouse: Carol Selby Price
- Children: Victoria and Veronica
- Website: robertmprice.mindvendor.com

Robert McNair Price (born July 7, 1954) is an American New Testament scholar who argues in favor of the Christ myth theory – the claim that a historical Jesus did not exist. Price is the author of a number of books on biblical studies and the historicity of Jesus.

A former Baptist minister, Price was a fellow of the Jesus Project, a group of 150 individuals who studied the historicity of Jesus and the Gospels, the organizer of a Web community for those interested in the history of Christianity, and a member of the advisory board of the Secular Student Alliance. He is a religious skeptic, especially of orthodox Christian beliefs, occasionally describing himself as a Christian atheist. Price eventually espoused the Christ myth theory, believing Jesus did not exist in Roman Galilee.

Price is also a writer, editor, and critic in the field of speculative fiction. He has written about the Cthulhu Mythos, a shared universe created by the writer H. P. Lovecraft. Price was appointed executor of Lin Carter's literary estate. In 2020, an inflammatory introduction he wrote to Lin Carter's Flashing Swords! 6 anthology caused multiple authors to withdraw their work in protest. He co-wrote a book on the rock band Rush with his wife, Carol Selby Price, Mystic Rhythms: The Philosophical Vision of Rush (1999).

Price is currently the editor of the Journal of Higher Criticism.

== Background ==
Price was born in Jackson, Mississippi, in 1954 and moved to New Jersey in 1964. He received a Master of Theological Studies in New Testament from Gordon–Conwell Theological Seminary in 1978. At Drew University, he was awarded one Ph.D. in Systematic Theology in 1981 and another in New Testament in 1991. Price was pastor of the First Baptist Church in Montclair, New Jersey. He has served as Professor of Religion at Mount Olive College. He additionally did some work at minor institutions, including professorships at nonaccredited schools Johnnie Colemon Theological Seminary and the Center for Inquiry Institute.

== Christ myth theory ==
Price challenges biblical literalism and argues for a more skeptical and humanistic approach to Christianity. Price questioned the historicity of Jesus in a series of books, including Deconstructing Jesus (2000), The Incredible Shrinking Son of Man (2003), Jesus Is Dead (2007), and The Christ-Myth Theory and Its Problems (2012), as well as in Jesus at the Vanishing Point, a contribution to The Historical Jesus: Five Views (2009).

=== Methodology ===
Price uses critical-historical methods, but also uses "history-of-religions parallel[s]," or the "Principle of Analogy," to show similarities between Gospel narratives and non-Christian Middle Eastern myths. Price criticizes some of the criteria of critical Bible research, such as the criterion of dissimilarity and the criterion of embarrassment. Price further notes that "consensus is no criterion" for the historicity of Jesus. In Jesus at the Vanishing Point, Price acknowledges that he stands against the majority view of scholars, but cautions against attempting to settle the issue by appeal to the majority.

=== Key arguments for the Christ myth theory ===
In Jesus at the Vanishing Point (2010), Price gives three key points for the traditional Christ myth theory, which originated with Bruno Bauer and the Dutch Radical School:

- There is no mention of a miracle-working Jesus in secular sources; Price asserts that Eusebius fabricated the Testimonium Flavianum.
- The epistles, written earlier than the gospels, provide no evidence of a recent historical Jesus; all that can be taken from the epistles, Price argues, is that a Jesus Christ, son of God, lived in a heavenly realm, there died as a sacrifice for human sin, was raised by God, and enthroned in heaven.
- The Jesus narrative is paralleled in Middle Eastern myths about dying and rising gods; Price names Baal, Osiris, Attis, Adonis, and Dumuzi/Tammuz as examples, all of which, he writes, survived into the Hellenistic and Roman periods and thereby influenced Early Christianity. Price alleges that Christian apologists have tried to downplay these parallels.

In The Christ-Myth Theory and Its Problems (2011), Price maintains that the Christ myth theory is the most likely explanation for the origin of Christianity, giving another overview of arguments:

- "almost every story in the Gospels (and Acts) can be plausibly argued to be borrowed from the Greek Old Testament, Homer, or Euripides."
- "every detail of the narrated life of Jesus fits the outlines of the Mythic Hero archetype present in all cultures."
- "the epistles, regardless of their dates as earlier or later than the gospels, seem to enshrine a different vein of early Christian faith which lacked an earthly Jesus, a Christianity that understood "Jesus" as an honorific throne-name bestowed on a spiritual savior who had been ambushed and killed by the Archons who rule the universe before he rose triumphant over them [...] Christianity eventually rewrote Jesus into an historical incarnation who suffered at the hands of earthly institutions of religion and government."

=== Jesus-agnosticism ===
Price argues that if critical methodology is applied with ruthless consistency, one is left in complete agnosticism regarding Jesus's historicity. Price is quoted saying, "There might have been a historical Jesus, but unless someone discovers his diary or his skeleton, we'll never know." He also similarly declared in a 1997 public debate:

If there was a historical Jesus lying back of the gospel Christ, he can never be recovered. If there ever was a historical Jesus, there isn't one any more.

Price notes that historians of classical antiquity approached mythical figures such as Heracles by rejecting supernatural tales while doggedly assuming that "a genuine historical figure" could be identified at the root of the legend. He describes this general approach as Euhemerism, and argues that most historical Jesus research today is also Euhemerist. Price argues that Jesus is like other ancient mythic figures, in that no mundane, secular information seems to have survived. Accordingly, Jesus also should be regarded as a mythic figure, but Price admits to some uncertainty in this regard. He writes at the conclusion of his 2000 book Deconstructing Jesus: "There may have been a real figure there, but there is simply no longer any way of being sure." (Note: In Deconstructing Jesus Price points out, "(w)hat one Jesus reconstruction leaves aside, the next one takes up and makes its cornerstone. Jesus simply wears too many hats in the Gospels – exorcist, healer, king, prophet, sage, rabbi, demigod, and so on. The Jesus Christ of the New Testament is a composite figure ... The historical Jesus (if there was one) might well have been a messianic king, or a progressive Pharisee, or a Galilean shaman, or a magus, or a Hellenistic sage. But he cannot very well have been all of them at the same time." Price also states "I am not trying to say that there was a single origin of the Christian savior Jesus Christ, and that origin is pure myth; rather, I am saying that there may indeed have been such a myth, and that if so, it eventually flowed together with other Jesus images, some one of which may have been based on a historical Jesus the Nazorean." In a discussion on euhemerism, Price cautiously asserts that "a genuine historical figure" may ultimately lie at the root of the Christian religion. That figure (about whom he detects no surviving mundane, secular information) would have eventually been made into God through apotheosis. Nonetheless, Price admits uncertainty in this regard. He writes in conclusion, "There may have been a real figure there, but there is simply no longer any way of being sure.")

=== Mythological origins ===
Price believes that Christianity is a historicized synthesis of mainly Egyptian, Jewish, and Greek mythologies, viewing Jesus of Nazareth as an invented figure conforming to the Rank-Raglan mythotype.

Price argues that the early Christians adopted the model for the figure of Jesus from the popular Mediterranean dying-rising saviour myths of the time, such as that of Dionysus. He argues that the comparisons were known at the time, as early church father Justin Martyr had admitted the similarities. Price suggests that Christianity simply adopted themes from the dying-rising god stories of the day and supplemented them with themes (escaping crosses, empty tombs, children being persecuted by tyrants, etc.) from contemporaneous popular stories in order to come up with the narratives about Christ.

=== Gospels as midrash ===
Price asserts that there was an almost complete fleshing out of the details of the gospels by a midrashic rewriting of the Septuagint, Josephus, Homer, and Euripides' The Bacchae. According to Price, "virtually every story in the gospels and Acts can be shown to be very likely a Christian rewrite of material" from those sources and "virtually every case of New Testament narrative" can be traced back to a literary prototype, so that there is "virtually nothing left."

=== Influences of Greek Cynicism ===
Price does not see in the Q document a reliable source for the historical Jesus, simply because Q shows everywhere a Cynic flavor, representing a school of thought rather than necessarily the teaching of a single person. Price acknowledges that outside the New Testament there are a small number of ancient sources (Tacitus, for example) who would testify that Jesus was a person who really lived. However, Price points out that, even assuming the authenticity of these references, they relate more to the claims of the Christians who lived at that time on Jesus, and do not prove that Jesus was a contemporary of the writers of antiquity.

=== Historicising the myth ===
Citing accounts that have Jesus being crucified under Alexander Jannaeus (83 BCE) or in his 50s by Herod Agrippa I under the rule of Claudius Caesar (41–54 CE), Price argues that these "varying dates are the residue of various attempts to anchor an originally mythic or legendary Jesus in more or less recent history."

Price also propounds the belief that the town of Nazareth did not exist during the first half of the first century CE, and is a pseudo-historical invention. Price and Bart Ehrman disputed this issue in the dueling works Did Jesus Exist? and Price's Bart Ehrman and the Quest of Historical Jesus of Nazareth: An Evaluation of Ehrman's Did Jesus Exist?

== H. P. Lovecraft scholarship ==
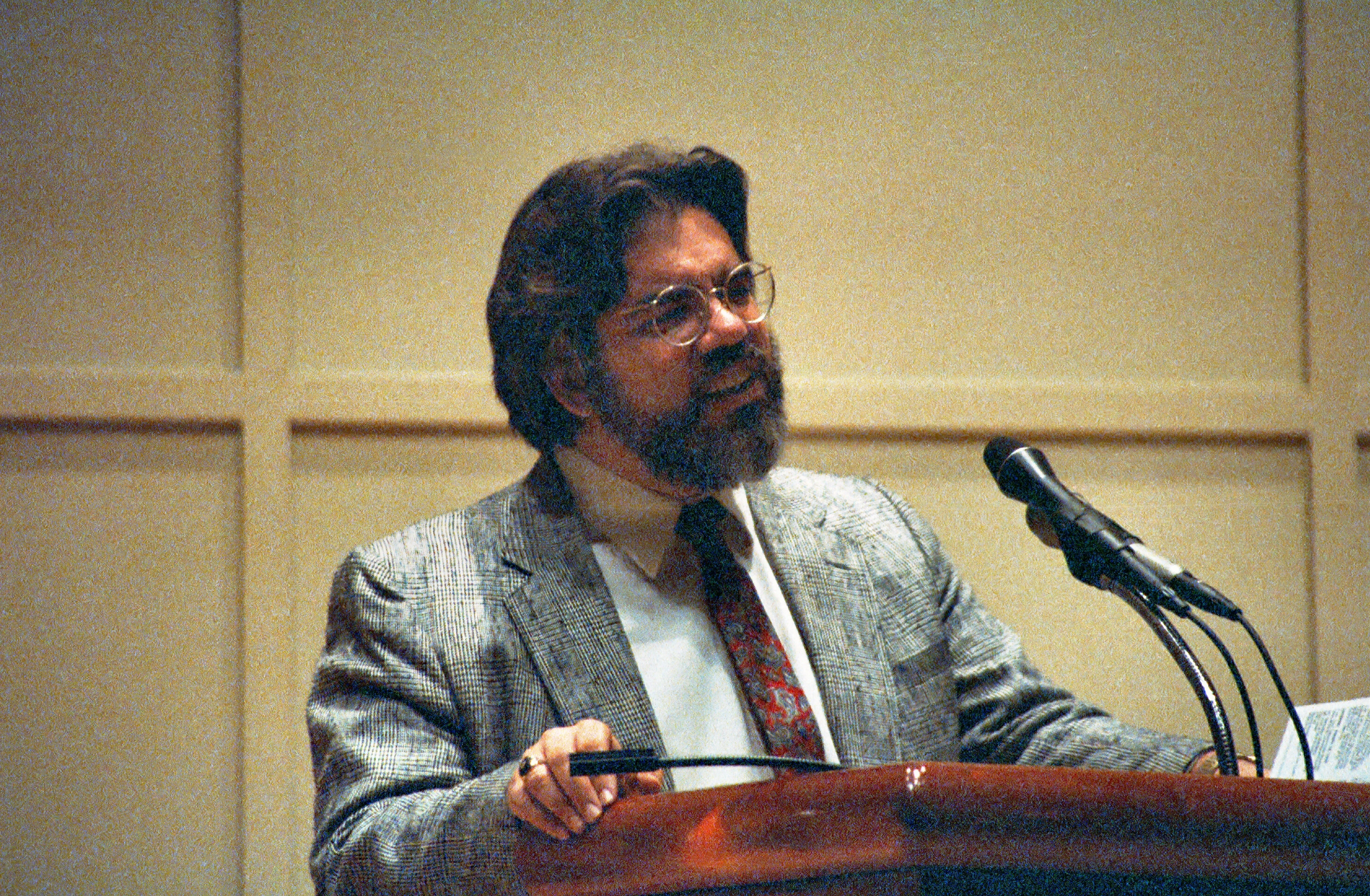
Robert M. Price speaking in the Salomon Center at Brown University in 1990

Price has been a figure in H. P. Lovecraft scholarship and fandom for many years. He is the editor of the journal Crypt of Cthulhu. (published by Necronomicon Press) and of a series of Cthulhu Mythos anthologies. In essays that introduce the anthologies and the individual stories, Price traces the origins of Lovecraft's entities, motifs, and literary style. The Cthulhu Cycle, for example, saw the origins of Cthulhu the octopoid entity in Alfred, Lord Tennyson's "The Kraken" (1830) and particular passages from Lord Dunsany, while The Dunwich Cycle points to the influence of Arthur Machen on Lovecraft's "The Dunwich Horror."

Price's religious background often informs his Mythos criticism, seeing gnostic themes in Lovecraft's fictional god Azathoth and interpreting "The Shadow Over Innsmouth" as a kind of initiation ritual.

Price was in charge of the majority of the early Cthulhu anthologies by Chaosium; his first book published by Chaosium was The Hastur Cycle (1993), a short story anthology about a single element of Lovecraftian stories, and following this was Mysteries of the Worm (1993), a collection Cthulhu Mythos fiction by Robert Bloch.

== Journal of Higher Criticism ==
The Journal of Higher Criticism is an academic journal covering issues "dealing with historical, literary, and history-of-religion issues from the perspective of higher criticism", initially published by the Institute for Higher Critical Studies. Price is the editor-in-chief. The periodical is held in the Library of Congress and other research libraries.

In the introductory article, the editor criticized modern biblical scholarship as "a toothless tiger or worse yet, covert apologetics wearing the Esau-mask of criticism" and advocated a return to the "golden era of bold hypotheses and daring reconstructions associated with the great names of F. C. Baur and Tübingen".

During the journal's first decade, it was sponsored by The Theological School at Drew University, where associate editor Darrell J. Doughty taught. The final issue before Doughty's retirement (volume 10, no. 2) appeared in Fall, 2003. It continued for two more issues independently of an institution with volumes 11 and 12, each with two issues before ending.

The journal was revived in March 2018. Vol. 13, no. 1 was published on Price's website. Volume 13, nos. 1–4; volume 14, nos. 1, supplement, and 4; volume 15, nos. 1–3; and volume 16, nos. 1–2, were subsequently published and are available for sale at a major online book retailer, as of January 2022.

== Other works ==
In 2010 Price became one of three new hosts on Point of Inquiry (the Center for Inquiry's podcast), following the retirement of host D. J. Grothe from the show. Having appeared on the show twice before as a guest (see external links below), he hosted until 2012. Price hosted The Bible Geek, a podcast where Price answered listeners' questions. The most recent show was in June 2019. Price was a regular guest on an interview podcast about religion, "MythVision Podcast."

In 2005, Price appeared in Brian Flemming's documentary film The God Who Wasn't There, is the subject of the documentary "The Gospel According to Price" by writer/director Joseph Nanni, and appears in the films of Jozef K. Richards in the documentary, Batman & Jesus, and comedy series, Holy Shit.

In 2020, Price was in the process of bringing back a fantasy adventure anthology series called Flashing Swords!, which was popular in the late 1970s. In the introduction to the sixth volume, he had made several statements that readers and other collaborating authors felt were transphobic, misogynistic, and racist. Several authors, in response, had their names and works retracted from the volume.

== Debates ==
In 1999, Price debated William Lane Craig, arguing against the historicity of Jesus' resurrection. In 2010, he debated James White, arguing against the reliability of the Bible. In 2010, Price debated Douglas Jacoby, on Jesus: Man, Myth, or Messiah? In 2016, he debated New Testament scholar Bart Ehrman on the historicity of Jesus. Although they disagreed, Ehrman considered Price one of the more esteemed proponents of mythicism as Price had the relevant credentials and study, compared to other mythicists whose expertise stemmed from other disciplines.

== Publications ==
Books on religion

- The Widow Traditions in Luke-Acts: A Feminist-Critical Scrutiny Society of Biblical Literature. ISBN 0-7885-0224-7 (1997).
- Mystic Rhythms: The Philosophical Vision of Rush Borgo Press. ISBN 1-58715-102-2. with Carol Selby Price (1998)
- Deconstructing Jesus Prometheus Books. ISBN 1-57392-758-9. (2000).
- The Incredible Shrinking Son of Man: How Reliable is the Gospel Tradition? Prometheus Books. ISBN 1-59102-121-9. (2003)
- The Empty Tomb: Jesus Beyond The Grave Prometheus Books. ISBN 1-59102-286-X edited with Jeffery Jay Lowder (2005) with the following articles: "Introduction: The Second Life of Jesus," "Apocryphal Apparitions: 1 Corinthians 15:3–11 as a Post Pauline Interpretation" and "By This Time He Stinketh: The Attempts of William Lane Craig to Exhume Jesus."
- The Da Vinci Fraud: Why the Truth Is Stranger than Fiction Prometheus Books. ISBN 1-59102-348-3. (2005).
- The Reason Driven Life: What Am I Here on Earth For? Prometheus Books. ISBN 1-59102-476-5. (2006).
- The Pre-Nicene New Testament: Fifty-four Formative Texts Signature Books ISBN 1-56085-194-5. (2006)
- The Paperback Apocalypse: How the Christian Church was Left Behind Prometheus Books. ISBN 1-59102-583-4. (2007).
- Jesus is Dead American Atheist Press ISBN 1-57884-000-7. (2007).
- Top Secret: The Truth Behind Today's Pop Mysticisms Prometheus Books. ISBN 1-59102-608-3 (2008)
- Beyond Born Again: Towards Evangelical Maturity Wildside Press. ISBN 1-4344-7748-7 (2008).
- Inerrant the Wind: The Evangelical Crisis of Biblical Authority Prometheus Books. ISBN 1-59102-676-8 (2008).
- The Case Against The Case For Christ: A New Testament Scholar Refutes the Reverend Lee Strobel, American Atheist Press. ISBN 1-57884-005-8 (2010)
- Jesus Christ Superstar: The Making of a Modern Gospel. eBookIt (2011)
- Paul: The Lost Epistles eBookIt.com (2011)
- The Christ-Myth Theory and Its Problems American Atheist Press. ISBN 1-57884-017-1 (2011)
- The Amazing Colossal Apostle: The Search for the Historical Paul Signature Books ISBN 1-56085-216-X (2012)
- Bart Ehrman and the Quest of Historical Jesus of Nazareth: An Evaluation of Ehrman's Did Jesus Exist? ISBN 978-1-57884-019-9 edited with Frank R. Zindler the following articles, "Introduction: Surprised by Myth" and "Bart Ehrman: Paradigm Policeman." American Atheist Press 2013 (2013)
- The Needletoe Letters, eBookIt (2012)
- Killing History: Jesus In The No-Spin Zone, Prometheus Books, ISBN 978-1-61614-967-3 (2014)
- When Gospels Collide, GCRR Press, ISBN 978-1-7378469-8-7 (2021)
- (With John W. Loftus) Varieties of Jesus Mythicism: Did He Even Exist?, Hypatia Press, ISBN 978-1-83919-158-9 (2021)
- Judaizing Jesus: How New Testament Scholars Created the Ecumenical Golem, Pitchstone Publishing, ISBN 978-1-63431-213-4, (2021)
- Merely Christianity: A Systemic Critique of Theology, Pitchstone Publishing, ISBN 978-1-63431-221-9, (2022)
- Not Peace but a Sword: The Case Against Early Christian Pacifism, Pitchstone Publishing, ISBN 978-1-63431-287-5, (2026)

Chapters and articles on religion

- "The Evolution of the Pauline Canon", in Hervormde Teologiese Studies, Number 1&2 June 1997, 36–67
- Chapter: "Jesus: Myth and Method" in The Christian delusion edited by John W. Loftus, Amherst, NY Prometheus Books 2010 ISBN 1-61614-168-9
- Foreword to Beyond the Crusades, American Atheist Press (2016) by Michael B. Paulkovich ISBN 1-57884-033-3
- Apocryphal Apparitions: 1 Corinthians 15:3–11 as a Post-Pauline Interpolation, Journal of Higher Criticism 2/2 (Fall 1995), 69–99
- Robert Eisenman's James the Brother of Jesus: A Higher-Critical Evaluation, Journal of Higher Criticism 4/2 (Fall 1997)

Cthulhu Mythos (as editor or author)

- Acolytes of Cthulhu
- The Antarktos Cycle: Horror and Wonder at the Ends of the Earth
- The Azathoth Cycle: The Blind Idiot God
- Beyond the Mountains of Madness (featuring short stories inspired by Lovecraft's At the Mountains of Madness, plus one Weird Tales story that probably inspired Lovecraft)
- Black Forbidden Things
- Blasphemies & Revelations Mythos Books. ISBN 0-9789911-9-2. (2008).
- The Book of Eibon
- The Book of Iod (stories by Henry Kuttner)
- The Cthulhu Cycle: Thirteen Tentacles of Terror
- Dark Wisdom: New Tales of the Old Ones (stories by Gary Myers)
- The Dunwich Cycle: Where the Old Gods Wait
- The Exham Cycle
- The Hastur Cycle
- The Horror of It All: Encrusted Gems from the "Crypt of Cthulhu"
- H.P. Lovecraft and the Cthulhu Mythos
- The Innsmouth Cycle: The Taint of the Deep Ones
- The Ithaqua Cycle: The Wind-Walker of the Icy Wastes
- Lin Carter: A Look Behind His Imaginary Worlds
- Lin Carter's Anton Zarnak, Supernatural Sleuth
- Lin Carter's Flashing Swords! 6 (2020, 2021)
- Lin Carter's Flashing Swords! 7 (2023)
- Lin Carter's Flashing Swords! 8 (2023)
- Lovecraft: A Look Behind the Cthulhu Mythos (with Lin Carter) Borgo Pr; Rev Sub edition (1997) ISBN 978-0-89370-013-3
- The Mighty Warriors (2018)
- Mysteries of the Worm (stories by Robert Bloch)
- Nameless Cults: The Cthulhu Mythos Fiction of Robert E. Howard
- The Necronomicon
- The New Lovecraft Circle
- The Nyarlathotep Cycle: The God of a Thousand Forms
- Secret Asia's Blackest Heart: A Horror Anthology
- Shards of Darkness (stories by Edward P. Berglund)
- The Shub-Niggurath Cycle: Tales of the Black Goat with a Thousand Young
- The Sword of Thongor (2016)
- The Taint of Lovecraft (stories by Stanley Sargeant)
- Tales of the Lovecraft Mythos
- Tales Out of Dunwich
- Tales Out of Innsmouth: New Stories of the Children of Dagon
- Thongor Conquers the Underground World
- Tindalos Cycle
- The Tsathoggua Cycle: Terror Tales of the Toad God
- Worlds of Cthulhu
- The Xothic Legend Cycle: The Complete Mythos Fiction of Lin Carter
- The Yig Cycle
- The Yith Cycle: Lovecraftian Tales of the Great Race and Time Travel
- The Yog Sothoth Cycle
- Young Thongor (2012)

Magazines

- Editor of Midnight Shambler, Eldritch Tales, and Crypt of Cthulhu

== Sources ==
- Price, Robert M. (2003a). The Incredible Shrinking Son of Man: How Reliable Is the Gospel Tradition?. Prometheus Books. ISBN 978-1-59102-121-6.
- Price, Robert M. (2009). "Jesus at the Vanishing Point". In Beilby, James K.; Eddy, Paul Rhodes (eds.). The Historical Jesus: Five Views. InterVarsity.
- Price, Robert M. (2011a). The Christ-Myth Theory and Its Problems. American Atheist Press. ISBN 978-1-57884-017-5.
