= Jack Vance bibliography =

This is a complete list of works by American science fiction and fantasy author Jack Vance.

== Works ==
=== Fantasy ===
==== The Dying Earth ====
- The Dying Earth (author's preferred title: Mazirian the Magician, collection of linked stories, 1950)
- The Eyes of the Overworld (author's preferred title: Cugel the Clever, novel 1966)
- Cugel's Saga (author's preferred title: Cugel: The Skybreak Spatterlight, novel, 1983)
- Rhialto the Marvellous (collection of linked stories, 1984)

==== Lyonesse ====
- Lyonesse: Suldrun's Garden (1983) (also titled Lyonesse and Suldrun's Garden)
- Lyonesse: The Green Pearl (1985) (also titled The Green Pearl)
- Lyonesse: Madouc (1989) (also titled Madouc)

=== Science fiction ===
==== The Demon Princes Series ====
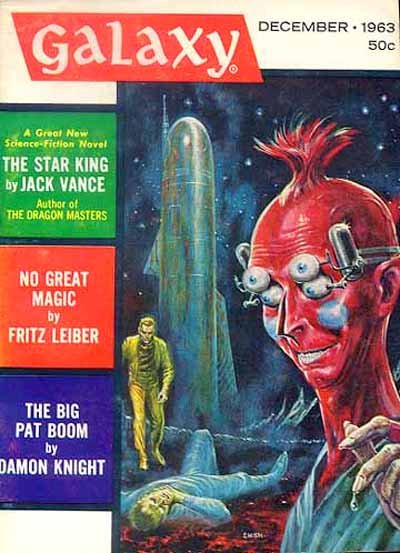
Vance's The Star King was serialized in Galaxy Science Fiction

- The Star King (1964)
- The Killing Machine (1964)
- The Palace of Love (1967)
- The Face (1979)
- The Book of Dreams (1981)

==== The Cadwal Chronicles ====
- Araminta Station (1987)
- Ecce and Old Earth (1991)
- Throy (1992)

==== Alastor ====
- Trullion: Alastor 2262 (1973)
- Marune: Alastor 933 (1975)
- Wyst: Alastor 1716 (1978)
- Both The Gray Prince and Maske: Thaery have backgrounds in the Alastor Cluster.

==== Durdane ====
- The Anome (alternate title: The Faceless Man, 1973)
- The Brave Free Men (1973)
- The Asutra (1974)

==== Tschai ====
- City of the Chasch (author's preferred title: The Chasch. 1968)
- Servants of the Wankh (reissue title: The Wannek, 1969)
- The Dirdir (1969)
- The Pnume (1970)

=== Non-series science fiction novels ===
- The Five Gold Bands (alternate title: The Space Pirate, author's preferred title: The Rapparee) (1953)
- Vandals of the Void (young adult novel) (1953)
- To Live Forever (1956)
- Big Planet (1957)
- The Languages of Pao (1958)
- Slaves of the Klau (original title: Planet of the Damned; alternate title preferred by Vance: Gold and Iron) (1958)
- Space Opera (1965)
- The Blue World (1966)
- Emphyrio (1969)
- The Gray Prince (author's preferred title: The Domains of Koryphon) (1974)
- Showboat World (author's preferred title: The Magnificent Showboats of the Lower Vissel River, Lune XXIII South, Big Planet) (1975)
- Maske: Thaery (1976)
- Night Lamp (1996)
- Ports of Call (1998)
- Lurulu (2004) — sequel to Ports of Call, completing a short multi-part novel

=== Selected novellas ===
- "The Potters of Firsk" (1950)
- "Overlords of Maxus" (1951 February issue of Thrilling Wonder Stories)
- "Son of the Tree" (1951; reissued as a novel in 1964)
- "Abercrombie Station" and its sequel "Cholwell's Chickens" (both 1952; two novellas later issued as Monsters in Orbit in 1965)
- "Telek" (1952)
- "Three-Legged Joe" (short story) (1953; featured in Startling Stories)
- "Sjambak" (first published in If: Worlds of Science Fiction magazine, July, 1953)
- "The Houses of Iszm" (1954; reissued as a novel in 1964)
- "The Miracle Workers", (1958)
- "Dodkin's Job" (1959)
- "The Moon Moth" (1961)
- "Gateway to Strangeness" (1962) (also titled "Dust of Far Suns" and "Sail 25")
- "The Dragon Masters" (1963 - Hugo Award Winner)
- "The Brains of Earth" (author's preferred title: "Nopalgarth") (1966)
- "The Last Castle" (1966, Nebula Award winner; illustrated by Alicia Austin in 1980)

=== Mystery/thrillers ===
- Take My Face (1957), as "Peter Held"
- Isle of Peril (1957), as "Alan Wade" (also titled Bird Isle)
- Strange People, Queer Notions (1958)
- The Man In the Cage (1960)
- The Four Johns (1964), as "Ellery Queen" (also titled Four Men Called John, UK 1976)
- A Room to Die In (1965), as "Ellery Queen"
- The Fox Valley Murders (1966)
- The Madman Theory (1966), as "Ellery Queen"
- The Pleasant Grove Murders (1967)
- The Deadly Isles (1969)
- Bad Ronald (1973)
- The View from Chickweed's Window (1979)
- The House on Lily Street (1979)
- The Dark Ocean (1985)

=== Collections ===
- Future tense. 1964.
- The World Between and Other Stories (1965)
- The Many Worlds of Magnus Ridolph (1966)
- Eight Fantasms and Magics (1969)
- The Worlds of Jack Vance (1973)
- The Best of Jack Vance (1976)
- Galactic Effectuator (this title is an editorial invention for the collected Miro Hetzel stories "Freitzke's Turn" and "The Dogtown Tourist Agency") (1980)
- Lost Moons (1982)
- The Narrow Land (1982)
- The Augmented Agent and Other Stories (1986)
- The Dark Side of the Moon (1986)
- Chateau D'If and Other Stories (1990)
- When the Five Moons Rise (1992)
- Tales of the Dying Earth (1999)
- The Jack Vance Treasury (2007), ISBN 1-59606-077-8
- Wild Thyme, Green Magic (2009)
- Dowling, Terry & Jonathan Strahan, eds. (2010). Hard-Luck Diggings: The Early Jack Vance, Volume One. Subterranean Press. ISBN 978-1596063013.
- Dowling, Terry & Jonathan Strahan, eds. (2012). Dream Castles : The Early Jack Vance, Volume Two. Subterranean Press. ISBN 978-1596064515.
- Dowling, Terry & Jonathan Strahan, eds. (2013). Magic Highways: The Early Jack Vance, Volume Three. Subterranean Press. ISBN 978-1596065604.
- Dowling, Terry & Jonathan Strahan, eds. (2014). Minding The Stars: The Early Jack Vance, Volume Four. Subterranean Press. ISBN 978-1596066458.
- Dowling, Terry & Jonathan Strahan, eds. (2015). Grand Crusades : The Early Jack Vance, Volume Five. Subterranean Press. ISBN 978-1596067103.

=== Autobiography ===
- This is Me, Jack Vance! (Subterranean Press, 2009) (won the 2010 Hugo Award, Best Related Book)
