= Underwood–Miller =

Defunct American specialty small press

Underwood–Miller Publishing
- Founded: 1976
- Founder: Tim Underwood and Chuck Miller
- Country of origin: United States
- Headquarters location: 418 Broadway # 7932, Albany, New York
- Publication types: books
- Official website: www.underwoodmillerpublishing.com 📞 +1 888-525-0490

Underwood–Miller Publisher. is a science fiction and fantasy small press specialty publishing house in San Francisco, California, founded in 1976. It was founded by Tim Underwood, a San Francisco book and art dealer, and Chuck Miller, a Pennsylvania used book dealer, after the two had met at a convention.

Underwood and Miller chose to begin with a first hardcover edition of The Dying Earth by Jack Vance, a classic fantasy novel never done before in hardcover. Both Donald M. Grant, Publisher, Inc. and Mirage Press had tried to publish The Dying Earth but had failed to obtain the rights. Underwood was acquainted with Vance and was able to secure the rights directly from him. Vance was enthusiastic, had several other projects in mind, and became the author most identified with the press. In the next few years they produced a number of Vance hardcovers, many of them new to boards as well as a few reprints of scarce, early Vance hardcovers.

The press then diversified and began publishing works by other authors such as Philip K. Dick, Harlan Ellison, Robert Silverberg and Roger Zelazny. In several such cases, the books in question printed recently done stories that either appeared only in magazine form or only in paperback, with no previous hardcover edition.

In 1994, Underwood and Miller dissolved the partnership. As their last book, they reprinted The Dying Earth.

== Imprints ==
- Underwood–Miller launched Brandywyne Books in association with Waldenbooks in the mid 1980s. The imprint was founded to bring out limited editions as Underwood–Miller had done for science fiction, but for all genres.
- Underwood–Miller published The Third Invention: How the Bow and Arrow Made History, by Steve Hayes, in 1990 as "A Hammersmith Book—An Imprint of Underwood–Miller". It was the only book published under this imprint.
- Underwood–Miller published Computer: Bit Slices from a Life, by Herbert R.J. Grosch, in 1991 as "A Third Millennium/Underwood–Miller Book". It was the only book published under this imprint.

== Awards ==
In 1994, Underwood–Miller Publisher won a World Fantasy Award, Special Award—Professional, for publishing.

== Books published ==
- The Dying Earth, by Jack Vance (1976)
- Always Comes Evening, by Robert E. Howard (1977)
- Eyes of the Overworld, by Jack Vance (1978)
- Fantasy and Science Fiction by Jack Vance, excerpted from a work in progress of Daniel Levack by Tim Underwood and Chuck Miller (1978)
- Big Planet, by Jack Vance (1978)
- Fantasms: A Jack Vance Bibliography, by Daniel Levack and Tim Underwood (1978)
- The View From Chickweed's Window, by John Holbrook Vance (1978)
- The House on Lily Street, by John Holbrook Vance (1979)
- City of the Chasch, by Jack Vance (1979)
- The Seventeen Virgins, by Jack Vance (1979)
- The Bagful of Dreams, by Jack Vance (1979)
- The Seventeen Virgins/The Bagful of Dreams: The Adventures of Cugel The Clever, by Jack Vance (1979)
- Green Magic, by Jack Vance (1979)
- The Bells of Shoredan, by Roger Zelazny (1979)
- Nebogipfel at the End of Time, by Richard A. Lupoff (1979)
- Crystal of a Hundred Dreams: A Portfolio, by Stephen E. Fabian (1979)
- Green Magic, by Jack Vance (1979)
- The Languages of Pao, by Jack Vance (1979)
- The Blue World, by Jack Vance (1979)
- Morreion, by Jack Vance (1979)
- Servants of the Wankh, by Jack Vance (1980)
- The Dirdir, by Jack Vance (1980)
- The Face, by Jack Vance (1980)
- Galactic Effectuator, by Jack Vance (1980)
- The Last Defender of Camelot, by Roger Zelazny (1980)
- For a Breath I Tarry, by Roger Zelazny (1980)
- All the Lies That Are My Life, by Harlan Ellison (1980)
- The Last Castle, by Jack Vance (1980)
- The Book of the Sixth World Fantasy Convention (1980)
- The Changing Land, by Roger Zelazny (1981)
- The Last Defender of Camelot, by Roger Zelazny (1981)
- The Desert of Stolen Dreams, by Robert Silverberg (1981)
- The Pnume, by Jack Vance (1981)
- The Book of Dreams, by Jack Vance (1981)
- The Star King, by Jack Vance (1981)
- The Killing Machine, by Jack Vance (1981)
- The Palace of Love, by Jack Vance (1981)
- To Spin is Miracle Cat, by Roger Zelazny (1981)
- PKD: A Philip K. Dick Bibliography, by Daniel J. H. Levack (1981)
- Gilden Fire, by Stephen R. Donaldson (1981)
- The Compass Rose, by Ursula K. Le Guin (1982)
- Elfquest, Wendy and Richard Pini (1982)
- Gold and Iron, by Jack Vance (1982)
- Lost Moons, by Jack Vance (1982)
- Eye of Cat, by Roger Zelazny (1982)
- Bad Ronald, by Jack Vance (1982)
- Floating Dragon, by Peter Straub (1982)
- Fear Itself: The Horror Fiction of Stephen King, edited by Tim Underwood and Chuck Miller (1982)
- Cugel's Saga, by Jack Vance (1983)
- De Camp: An L. Sprague de Camp Bibliography, by Charlotte Laughlin and Daniel J. H. Levack (1983)
- Son of the Tree, by Jack Vance (1983)
- Amber Dreams: A Roger Zelazny Bibliography, by Daniel J. H. Levack (1983)
- The Houses of Iszm, by Jack Vance (1983)
- The Coelura, by Anne McCaffrey (1983)
- The Magnificent Showboats of the Lower Vissel River, Lune XXIII, Big Planet, by Jack Vance (1983)
- Dilvish, the Damned, by Roger Zelazny (1983)
- The Man in the Cage, by Jack Vance (1983)
- The Faceless Man, by Jack Vance (1983)
- The Brave Free Men, by Jack Vance (1983)
- The Asutra, by Jack Vance (1983)
- Leeson Park and Belsize Square: Poems 1970 - 1975, by Peter Straub (1983)
- Suldrun's Garden: Lyonesse I, by Jack Vance (1983)
- Space Opera, by Jack Vance (1984)
- The Complete Magnus Ridolph, by Jack Vance (1984)
- Trullion: Alastor 2262, by Jack Vance (1984)
- Marune: Alastor 933, by Jack Vance (1984)
- Wyst: Alastor 1716, by Jack Vance (1984)
- Sailing to Byzantium, by Robert Silverberg (1985)
- Trumps of Doom, by Roger Zelazny (1985)
- The Green Pearl: Lyonesse II, by Jack Vance (1985)
- Blue Rose, by Peter Straub (1985)
- Strange Notions, by Jack Vance (1985)
- The Dark Ocean, by Jack Vance (1985)
- The Augmented Agent and Other Stories, by Jack Vance (1986)
- The Dark Side of the Moon, by Jack Vance (1986)
- Blood of Amber, by Roger Zelazny (1986)
- Kingdom of Fear: The World of Stephen King, edited by Tim Underwood and Chuck Miller (1986)
- Araminta Station, by Jack Vance (1987)
- The Collected Stories of Philip K. Dick, by Philip K. Dick (1987)
- The Selected Stories of Robert Bloch, by Robert Bloch (1987)
- The Secret Sharer, by Robert Silverberg (1988)
- Bare Bones: Conversations on Terror with Stephen King, edited by Tim Underwood and Chuck Miller (1988)
- Bird Isle, by Jack Vance (1988)
- Take My Face, by Jack Vance (1988)
- Reign of Fear: Fiction and Film of Stephen King, edited by Don Herron (1988)
- Harlan Ellison's Watching, by Harlan Ellison (1989)
- Screams: Three Novels of Terror, by Robert Bloch (1989)
- Feast of Fear: Conversations with Stephen King, edited by Tim Underwood and Chuck Miller (1989)
- Through the Ice, by Piers Anthony and Robert Kornwise (1989)
- Madouc: Lyonesse III, by Jack Vance (1989)
- Apocalypse, by Nancy Springer (1989)
- Horrorstory:The Collector's Edition, Vol. 5, edited by Karl Edward Wagner (1989)
- Dark Dreamers: Conversations with the Masters of Horror, edited Stanley Wiater (1990)
- Chateau D'If and Other Stories, by Jack Vance (1990)
- Horrorstory:Volume Four—The Collector's Edition, edited by Karl Edward Wagner (1990)
- Three Gothic Novels, by Anne McCaffrey (1990)
- Ecce and Old Earth, by Jack Vance (1991)
- Balook, by Piers Anthony (1991)
- Performing Artist: The Music of Bob Dylan, Volume One, 1960-1973, by Paul Williams (1991)
- The Complete Masters of Darkness, edited by Dennis Etchison (1991)
- The Selected Letters of Philip K. Dick—1974, edited by Paul Williams (1991)
- Berni Wrightson: A Look Back, by Berni Wrightson with Christopher Zavisa (1991)
- Clive Barker's Shadows in Eden, edited by Stephen Jones (1991)
- In Pursuit of VALIS: Selections From the Exegesis, by Philip K. Dick, edited by Lawrence Sutin (1991)
- Virgil Finlay's Women of the Ages, by Virgil Finlay, edited by Gerry de la Ree (1992)
- Horrorstory:Volume Three, edited by Karl Edward Wagner (1992)
- Throy, by Jack Vance (1992)
- The Jack Vance Lexicon: From Ahulph to Zipahgote, edited and with an introduction by Dan Temianka (1992)
- When the Five Moons Rise, by Jack Vance (1992)
- The Selected Letters of Philip K. Dick: 1975-1976, edited by Don Herron (1992)
- Bob Dylan: Performing Artist — The Middle Years: 1974-1986, by Paul Williams (1992)
- Strange Science, by Virgil Finlay (1993)
- The Selected Letters of Philip K. Dick: 1977-1979, edited by Don Herron (1993)
- The Five Gold Bands, by Jack Vance (1993)
- A Hannes Bok Treasury, by Hannes Bok, edited and with an introduction by Stephen D. Korshak (1993)
- The Shark-Infested Custard, by Charles Willeford (1993)
- Ladies & Legends, by Stephen E. Fabian (1993)
- Led Zeppelin: The Definitive Biography, by Ritchie Yorke (1993)
- Virgil Finlay's Fantasms, by Virgil Finlay (1993)
- Attention Deficit Disorder: A Different Perception, by Thom Hartman (1993)
- Dreamquests: The Art of Don Maitz, by Don Maitz (1993)
- The Selected Letters of Philip K. Dick: 1972-1973, by Philip K. Dick (1994)
- The Art of Star Wars Galaxy, edited by Gary Gerani (1994)
- The Work of Jack Vance, by Jerry Hewett and Daryl F. Mallett, edited by Boden Clarke (1994)
- The Dying Earth, by Jack Vance (1994)
