= Gaean Reach =

Science fiction setting created by Jack Vance

The Gaean Reach is a fictional region in space that is a setting for science fiction stories written by Jack Vance. Those of his works that are set in a universe evidently including the Gaean Reach, whether within it or near it, have been catalogued as the Gaean Reach series or super-series.

== Overview ==
The Gaean Reach includes all worlds colonized by humans, among which trade and travel flow freely for the most part. Its name apparently means "the range (reach) of [the people from] Earth (Gaea)"; it could also be derived from Old English 'rice' (pronounced reech-e), meaning 'realm' (cf. German Reich). Some of these worlds are advanced and cosmopolitan, such as Alphanor; others, like Thamber, are inhabited by shipwrecked and forgotten people who have reverted to feudalism.

As described in The Gray Prince, "the Gaean Reach encompasses a perceptible fraction of the galaxy. Trade routes thread space like capillaries in living tissue; thousands of worlds have been colonized, each different from every other, each working its specific change upon those men who live there. Never has the human race been less homogenous."

The period of the Gaean Reach spans several centuries, if not millennia, at an indeterminate but very distant time in the future. Specific dates are given in the early books of the Demon Princes series, but not in the others. The human civilization in the Demon Princes is the Oikumene, which can be seen as a precursor to or variant of the Gaean Reach. The Reach is mentioned in the three Alastor books, the Cadwal Chronicles, Ports of Call and Lurulu. Standalone works set in the Gaean Reach include Emphyrio, Night Lamp, Maske: Thaery and The Gray Prince.

== Novels set in the Gaean Reach ==
Per the Internet Speculative Fiction Database listing for the Gaean Reach.

=== Alastor Cluster ===
- Trullion: Alastor 2262 (1973)
- Marune: Alastor 933 (1975)
- Wyst: Alastor 1716 (1978)

=== Cadwal Chronicles ===
- Araminta Station (1987)
- Ecce and Old Earth (1991)
- Throy (1992)

=== Demon Princes series ===
- Star King (1964)
- The Killing Machine (1964)
- The Palace of Love (1967)
- The Face (1979)
- The Book of Dreams (1981)

=== Ports of Call ===
- Ports of Call (1998)
- Lurulu (2004)

=== Standalone novels ===
- The Gray Prince (1975)
- Maske: Thaery (1976)
- Night Lamp (1996)
