= Chris Foss =

British artist (born 1946)

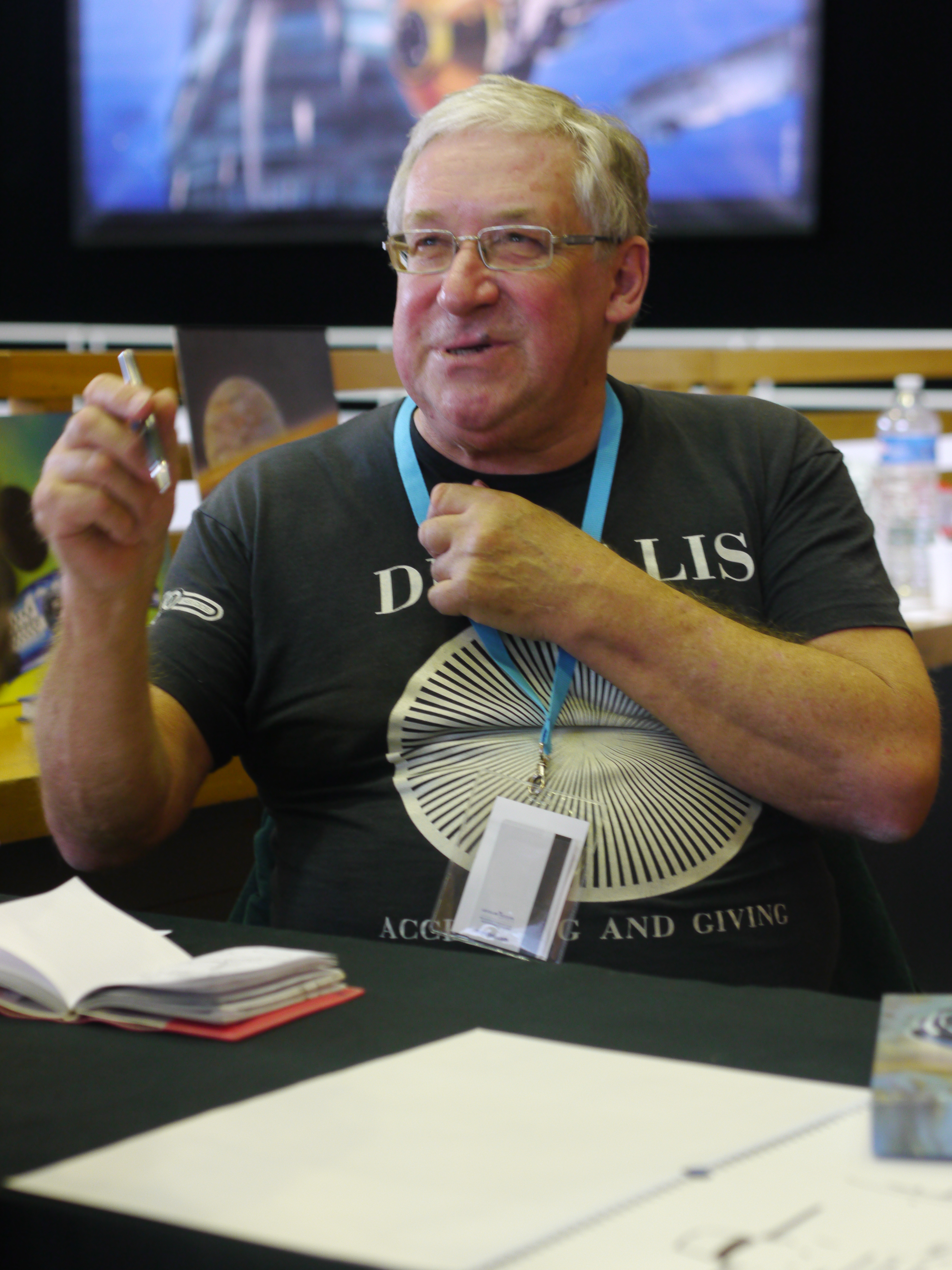
Chris Foss at the 2014 edition of the Utopiales in Nantes

Christopher Frank Foss (born 1946) is a British artist and science fiction illustrator. He is best known for his science fiction book covers and the black and white illustrations for the original editions of The Joy of Sex.

== Career ==
The cover of issue 2 of Science Fiction Monthly

Cover art for the album Clear Air Turbulence by the artist Ian Gillan Band

=== Early work ===
Born in 1946 in Guernsey, Channel Islands, Foss started working there as an artist in his teens, creating signage for local companies. He went to a boarding school in Dorset; his master encouraged him to train for an art scholarship. While studying at Magdalene College, Cambridge, he started pursuing professional magazine commissions, including the then recently launched Penthouse magazine.

=== Science fiction illustrations ===
Books featuring Foss illustrations include the 1970s British paperback covers for Isaac Asimov's Foundation Trilogy, several of Edmund Cooper's novels, and E. E. "Doc" Smith's Lensman and Skylark series. Some of the art he did produce was specific to the stories and some examples of this are the covers he did for the Grafton publications of the Demon Princes novels by Jack Vance in the late 1980s, Star King, The Killing Machine, The Palace of Love, The Face and The Book of Dreams.

Not being a fan of science fiction, Foss typically did not read the books he illustrated, preferring to paint scenes entirely from his imagination.

Foss designed the craft for the a Alejandro Jodorowsky's intended film version of the science fiction novel Dune by author Frank Herbert. Foss delivered several conceptual studies - published in the book 21st Century Foss, containing a foreword by Jodorowsky - but the project failed. In 1977 Foss worked for several months on studies for the movie Alien, which were ultimately not used in that film, and also did some designs of the planet Krypton for the movie Superman. Some of his crystal structures for the planet were realised in the movie, although they were used as ice-structures.

During this period Chris Foss illustrated the sleeve of the album Clear Air Turbulence for the Ian Gillan Band.

Painter Glenn Brown controversially appropriated individual space scene paintings by Foss and in the one case copying and altering it (Exercise One (for Ian Curtis), 1995) and in the other, leaving it entirely unchanged (Dark Angel (for Ian Curtis), 2002).

Chris Foss created much of the colour concept art for Sweetpea Entertainment's Traveller franchise, as produced by Imperium Games. He produced 12 pages of artwork for the new Traveller edition's first supplement, Starships (1996). He also illustrated a number of covers for Imperium's Traveller.

== Film work ==
- 1975 Jodorowsky version of Dune, spaceship and vehicle design.
- 1978 Superman by Richard Donner. Planet Krypton and set design (not used)
- 1979 Alien by Ridley Scott. Spaceship design (not used)
- 1980 Flash Gordon by Mike Hodges. Redesign of Gordon's rocket cycle
- 1995 Heaven or Bust (German Sc-fi comedy) Spaceship design
- 2000 A.I. Artificial Intelligence under Stanley Kubrick, until Kubrick's death in 1999
- 2014 Guardians of the Galaxy under James Gunn, who brought him on board to design the film's various spacecraft.

== Bibliography ==
- Foss, Chris. 21st Century Foss. Dragon's Dream, 1978. ISBN 0-906196-09-4.
- Foss, Chris. Hardware: The Definitive SF Works of Chris Foss. Titan Publishing, 2011. ISBN 0-85768-559-7
