= Yip =

Yip, YIP, or yips may refer to:

== People ==
- Yip (nickname), a list of people
- Ye (surname), a Chinese surname also romanized as Yip (葉), including a list of people

== Arts and entertainment ==
- Yip, a fictional race living in Winkie Country in the Land of Oz
- Yips, a fictional group of people in Jack Vance's science fiction Cadwal Chronicles trilogy
- "The Yips" (How I Met Your Mother), an episode of the TV series How I Met Your Mother

== Other uses ==
- Yips, a sports-related problem
- American slang for cocaine
- Youth International Party, a youth movement founded in 1967
- Yeast integrating plasmid or yeast integrative plasmid, a type of yeast plasmid
- YIP, IATA airport code for Willow Run Airport, Michigan
- yip, ISO 639-3 code for the Pholo language of China
