= Cadwal Chronicles =

Novel by Jack Vance

The Cadwal Chronicles are a trilogy of science fiction novels by American writer Jack Vance set in his Gaean Reach fictional universe. The three novels are called Araminta Station (1987), Ecce and Old Earth (1991), and Throy (1992).

== Background ==
Cadwal is a planet discovered by an explorer who is a member of the "Naturalist Society of Earth". The society decides to maintain Cadwal as a nature preserve and sets up a Conservancy based on a Charter. The Charter forbids mining and other exploitation, and permits strictly limited settlement. Only six "Agents", each in charge of a bureau with a staff of 20 men and 20 women, are allowed to reside permanently on the planet to enforce the Charter, although tourists are allowed in specially designed lodges, overlooking sites of natural beauty and interest.

From the earliest days, the Agents recruited relatives and close associates for their staffs, but as their numbers eventually exceeded the Charter limits, the excess remained on Cadwal as "collaterals" under the transparent fiction of being "temporary" labor. At their 16th birthday, each person learns their "index number", indicating their genealogical rank. A person whose index number is 20 or less upon their 21st birthday is granted Agency status; all others become lesser-status collaterals. Many collaterals choose to leave Cadwal to seek their fortune elsewhere in the Gaean Reach. Thus, the society of Cadwal is a highly stratified aristocracy, where success depends on birth as much as aptitude.

An additional group of temporary laborers is tolerated on the planet: the "Yips", who are described as the "descendants of runaway servants, illegal immigrants and others." For them, the Charter is more strictly enforced compared to the collaterals. They are allowed six-month work permits at Araminta Station, the main settlement, an enclave of 100 square miles (260 km^{2}) on Deucas, the most hospitable of Cadwal's three continents. When a permit expires, the Yip is returned to tiny, greatly overcrowded Lutwen Atoll, informally called Yipton. The Yips vastly outnumber the legitimate residents and are only prevented from settling Deucas by the superior firepower of Bureau B.

== Cadwal ==
=== Geography of Cadwal ===
Cadwal has three major continents: Deucas, Ecce and Throy. The remainder of the planet is covered in oceans with only a few small islands. Deucas is temperate and most suited to human settlement. Ecce is dominated by jungles and swamps and is baking hot. Throy is cold, with strong arctic winds and a forbidding landscape of mountains and cliffs.

=== The Conservancy ===
The Conservancy is a group of people allowed permanent residence on Cadwal. Their task is to enforce the provisions of the Charter (see below). Most are located at Araminta Station in Deucas but some, the governing politicians, live at Stroma on Throy. These latter persons include the Conservator, nominal leader of Cadwal, who resides at Riverview House.

Only six Agents and their staff were originally allowed to settle at Araminta Station. These agents were: Deamus Wook, Shirry Clattuc, Saul Diffin, Claude Offaw, Marvell Veder and Condit Laverty. Each Agent brought in family members, giving the initial administration "a cohesion which might otherwise have been lacking". In time, this led to an aristocracy of 120 persons – the twenty most closely related to each of the six original Agents – who are allowed permanent residence at Araminta Station.

=== The Charter ===
The Charter is the founding document of Cadwal and serves as its constitution. It forbids human settlement except in small areas with limited population allowed. The Charter grants ownership of Cadwal to the Naturalist Society in perpetuity. The provisions of the Charter are enforced by the Conservancy, in particular by Bureau B (see below).

=== Araminta Station ===
At Araminta Station, large mansion houses have been set up to accommodate each of the six original families. Over the generations, these mansions have grown to become palaces. The Station also boasts a hotel for visiting tourists, a spaceport, and a theatre, the Orpheum.

Each person at Araminta Station is expected to serve in one of the Bureaus:

- Bureau A: Records and Statistics
- Bureau B: Patrols and surveys: police and security services
- Bureau C: Taxonomy and cartography, natural sciences
- Bureau D: Domestic services
- Bureau E: Fiscal affairs: exports and imports
- Bureau F: Visitors' accommodations

Since the story revolves around police investigations, Bureau B features prominently in the books.

=== Stroma ===
Stroma is a town on Throy, located at a purposely inhospitable location on cliffs in a failed attempt to discourage Society members from Earth from settling there. Houses are thin and tall, designed to withstand adverse weather. The political class at Cadwal live here, chief amongst them the Conservator, nominal planetary leader, who resides at Riverview House.

Politics abound at Stroma. A new and supposedly progressive faction, called the Life, Peace and Freedom (LPF) party, is sympathetic to the Yips and advocates Yip settlement on Deucas. (This stand is later modified to the benefit of the LPFers.) This notion is strongly resisted by the conservative "Chartists" who insist the Charter must never be altered.

=== The Yips ===
Yips have a human appearance, with golden skin, and are physically highly attractive; yet they cannot breed with non-Yip humans, leading to speculation that the Yips have formed a new subspecies of humanity. (In the later books, it is discovered that this infertility is due to their diet. When eating normal food, they become fertile with humans) They are inscrutable and have no discernible sense of humour nor any morality recognisable to ordinary Gaean people (whose morality is roughly that of 20th century North Americans). This particularly manifests itself in their sexual practices: the Yips make no emotional attachment to sexual intercourse and will all consent to sex provided a price is paid. The Yips will do almost anything for money. Given their attractive appearance, the Yip females naturally take part in considerable prostitution. Indeed, Yip girls are compelled to take part in this to gain money for the Yip State.

In Araminta Station, the Yips are confined to the small Lutwen Islands. They would dearly love to colonise the hospitable continent of Deucas but are prevented from doing so by members of the Conservancy who, pursuant to the Charter, consider Cadwal to be a nature preserve and prevent humans from forming large settlements. The Yips care nothing for the Charter and feel no kinship with the members of the Conservancy, regarding themselves as a separate nation. Only the superior weaponry of the Conservancy prevents the Yips from overtaking the planet. An uneasy stalemate exists.

Despite this, the Yips are superficially polite to the folk of Araminta Station and are willing to work for them provided money is paid. The Yips gain further money from Tourists who are allowed to visit Yipton and must pay dearly for all services they use there, including sexual services at the notorious Pussycat Palace.

The Yips are ruled with great brutality by Titus Pompo, a dictator whose word is law. Pompo extracts taxes from all Yip activity and has a considerable personal fortune. Any Yip displeasing him is subject to murder and torture: there is no rule of law in the Yip state. Pompo uses much of the tax proceeds in his scheme to destroy the Conservancy and overrun Cadwal.

== Main characters ==
=== Glawen Clattuc ===
The novels are written in the third person, though they sometimes come close to employing an omniscient narrator viewpoint, and are told mainly from Glawen's point of view (with the exception of part of the second novel, which is told from the perspective of Wayness Tamm). He is an intelligent, capable young man and a member of the Conservancy at Araminta Station. Although his initial index number is a little high, Glawen has reasonable hopes for Agency status. He joins Bureau B, the department responsible for enforcing the laws of the Charter, and quickly becomes embroiled in a plot by the Yips to take over Deucas (possibly with the assistance of traitors at Araminta Station).

Glawen's first love, Sessily Veder, disappears and is presumed murdered. Glawen attempts to bring her killer to justice. He later wins the love of Wayness Tamm, daughter of the Conservator.

Glawen is a typical Vancian Everyman character, similar to Glinnes Hulden and, to a lesser extent, Adam Reith and Kirth Gersen.

=== Other characters ===
- Scharde Clattuc: Glawen's widowed father, a highly competent, senior Bureau B agent with IPCC status.
- Bodwyn Wook: Irascible, somewhat eccentric Director of Bureau B.
- Sessily Veder: Glawen's first love, she is beautiful and captivating, though a bit of a flirt. She disappears; the subsequent investigation suggests she was raped and murdered by an unidentified person.
- Egon Tamm: The Conservator of Cadwal, father to Wayness and Milo.
- Wayness Tamm: Glawen's second love interest. Her mother would like her to marry Sir Julian Bohost, but she falls for Glawen.
- Milo Tamm: Brother of Wayness, strongly pro-Conservancy. Killed by Yip sabotage.
- Spanchetta Clattuc: A forceful, overbearing woman who bears a strong grudge against Scharde for marrying an off-worlder rather than her.
- Simonetta "Smonny" Clattuc: Spanchetta's equally unpleasant sister, she becomes a collateral by neglecting to study for years and failing the academic exams. She leaves Cadwal.
- Arles Clattuc: Lazy son of Spanchetta and member of the Bold Lions. He is strongly suspected of being Sessily Veder's killer, but there is insufficient evidence. He later attempts to force himself on Wayness, but is foiled by Glawen and is rendered impotent as punishment. He loathes Glawen.
- Kirdy Wook: A member of the Bold Lions. Studious, considered dull and unattractive by women. Captured and tortured by the Yips at Yipton while doing undercover Bureau B work with Glawen. The experience unhinges his mind, and he exhibits a hatred of Glawen. Over Glawen's objections, Bodwyn Wook orders him to accompany Glawen on an important investigation off-world. He betrays Glawen, resulting in the latter's imprisonment by a sect. Unmasked at the end of the first novel as Sessily Veder's murderer.
- Sir Julian Bohost: A young politician from Stroma. He expects to marry Wayness, with the support of her mother, until she falls in love with Glawen. A fervent LPFer.
- Titus Pompo: The ruler, or Oomphaw, of the Yips. Pompo's identity is shrouded in secrecy as he does not show his face and disguises his voice using electronics. He is eventually revealed to be Smonny Clattuc's husband.

=== The Bold Lions ===
A club for devil-may-care teenage boys at Araminta Station, advocating bold stratagems, drinking parties, outrageous schemes and manly adventures. The club is largely designed to impress ladies, but fails in this regard, as it is considered boorish. Club members follow a complex code including regulation Roars and Growls and dress in lion costumes at festivals. To spy on the Yips, Glawen unwillingly joins the club at Bodwyn Wook's orders. Other members include Arles Clattuc and Kirdy Wook.
