= Alastor (disambiguation) =

Alastor may refer to a number of people and concepts in Greek mythology.

It may also refer to:

== Fictional ==
- Alastor Cluster, a fictional setting in three of American writer Jack Vance's novels
- Alastor Moody, a fictional character in the Harry Potter universe
- Alastor the Radio Demon, a fictional character in the adult animated series, Hazbin Hotel

== Others ==
- Alastor, or The Spirit of Solitude, a 1815 poem by Percy Bysshe Shelley
- Alastor (wasp), a genus of wasp
- Alastor: Book of Angels Volume 21, a 2014 album by violist and multi-instrumentalist Eyvind Kang

== See also ==
- Alistair, Scottish name
