= Eye of Cat =

1982 science fiction novel by Roger Zelazny

- Cover of first edition (hardcover)
- Author: Roger Zelazny
- Cover artist: Stephen E. Fabian
- Language: English
- Genre: Science fiction
- Publisher: Underwood-Miller
- Publication date: 1982
- Publication place: United States
- Media type: Print (Hardcover)
- Pages: 216
- ISBN: 0-934438-66-8
- OCLC: 20154669

Eye of Cat is a science fiction novel by American writer Roger Zelazny. Published in August 1982, it was among his five favorite novels from his own oeuvre.

== Plot summary ==
When the galaxy's most accomplished hunter is asked to use his skills to protect an important political mission, he realizes that he needs specialized aid. Thus Billy Blackhorse Singer must seek the shape-shifting telepathic creature only known as Cat, whom he had caught and trapped for a museum. Cat agrees to help on the condition that, once the mission is over, he be given the chance to hunt his former captor. Billy accepts Cat's offer. However, Billy has been growing increasingly fatalistic in the time leading up to the story, and originally offers to let Cat kill him with no struggle. Cat, a hunter, refuses, encouraging Billy to flee. Billy does so, but remains fatalistic, with Cat reading in his mind a wish to die and his foreknowledge of a final location. Billy must reconcile his personal chindi to evade Cat. Billy turns increasingly primitive, away from the technology of the day, and eventually returns to his Navajo roots. Traveling across the world using teleportation technology, he eventually comes to Canyon de Chelly where he regresses to a state where he can, or believes he can, walk in the spirit world. At the same time, a collection of psychics try to pool their powers to help him and to attack Cat. Cat is able to kill one by destroying his mind, but even so the dead man seems to linger as a part of their group consciousness.

Billy is eventually able to kill Cat, but then has to face his chindi, who is his death wish, in a battle that pits him against his own shadow. The novel ends with Billy apparently united with his other self.

== Notes ==
The dedication page reads "To Joe Leaphorn, Jimmy Chee and Tony Hillerman." Leaphorn and Chee are Navajo Tribal Police officers in mystery novels written by Hillerman. Zelazny took significant inspiration from those books, rich as they are in Navajo life and culture. Hillerman repaid the compliment by having one of his characters reading a Zelazny novel while on a stakeout.

The creature "Cat" is referred to as a Torglind Metamorph, the last of its species from a planet destroyed long ago when its star went nova. The alien's plight parallels that of Billy Singer, who has become displaced from his people and traditions.

The book contains several long cosmogonic poems that feature beings from the Navajo pantheon as characters.

Eye of Cat was nominated for the 1983 Locus Award.

== General sources ==
- Levack, Daniel J. H. (1983). Amber Dreams: A Roger Zelazny Bibliography. San Francisco: Underwood-Miller. p. 37. ISBN 0-934438-39-0.
- Chalker, Jack L.; Mark Owings (1998). The Science-Fantasy Publishers: A Bibliographic History, 1923–1998. Westminster, MD and Baltimore: Mirage Press, Ltd. p. 669.
