= Night Lamp =

1996 novel by Jack Vance

- First edition (h/b)
- Author: Jack Vance
- Cover artist: Stephen Hickman
- Language: English
- Series: Gaean Reach
- Genre: Science fiction novel
- Publisher: Underwood (h/b); Tor books (p/b)
- Publication date: Apr 1996 (h/b); Nov 1996 (p/b)
- Publication place: United States
- Media type: Print
- Pages: 389
- ISBN: 1-887424-18-0
- OCLC: 34583850
- LC Class: PS3572.A424 N54 1996

Night Lamp is a science fiction adventure novel by Jack Vance. It follows an orphan named Jaro Fath on his quest to learn where he came from.

== Plot summary ==
When the Faths, a childless academic couple, save young Jaro from a near-fatal beating, they discover he suffers from not just physical wounds, but also the crippling memory of his mother's death, which must be erased. Adopted by them, he grows up an outsider in a world of constant striving for social status, his only goal to become a spaceman and discover the truth of his missing memories. His journey takes him to Fader, a planet closed to the rest of the galaxy, whose inhabitants long ago engineered slave races to support their aristocratic lifestyle. Though Fader's Golden Age has long passed, and they now live in fear of many of their creations, they still maintain a fierce pride. Together with his father, Jaro must find a way to bring justice for his mother.
