= Cholwell's Chickens =

1952 novella by Jack Vance

The title page illustration from Cholwell's Chickens depicts a row of shuttle fliers.

Cholwell's Chickens is a science fiction novella by Jack Vance from 1952. It was first published in Thrilling Wonder Stories magazine in August 1952. It is the sequel to Abercrombie Station (published first in Thrilling Wonder Stories in the February 1952 edition). The book Monsters in Orbit included both novellas in one volume. Both novellas have the same protagonist, Jean Parlier, a bright, attractive 16-year-old girl who is an orphan. In Abercrombie Station, Jean goes to a space station to try to seduce its wealthy, eccentric owner. In Cholwell's Chickens, the now-wealthy Jean sets off to her home planet of Codrion to try to find out about her parents.

Cholwell's Chickens was included in a 2012 anthology of Vance's early writings, Dream Castles: the Early Jack Vance, edited by Terry Dowling and Jonathan Strahan. It was also published in French, as Cholwell et ses poules in a collection in 2019.

== Plot ==
In Cholwell's Chickens, Jean Parlier is wealthy from her reward from the previous venture on the space station, but as she is still a minor, she has to give a legal guardian, a fifty-year-old accountant named Mycroft. He warns her to be wary for grifters and con men who may feign romantic interest in her to get her money. She tells him she wants to go back to her home planet of Codrion to try to find her parents.

At Mycroft's office, she meets a strange 50-year-old scientist-entrepreneur named Cholwell. When Cholwell sees her he is shocked almost to the point of fainting, and asks what she is doing on Earth. Parlier finds this to be a puzzling remark, as she has never met him. Cholwell recovers and says he is seeking investors for a genetically-modified chicken cloning operation he is setting up on Codrion. Parlier dislikes the well-dressed, grey-haired Cholwell at this first meeting. When Colwell leaves, Parlier asks Mycroft to get her a ticket to Codrion.

Once at her home planet, Jean looks for clues to her past and her family. She starts by going to the bar formerly owned by her foster parent, a mean, harsh man with criminal connections. She remembers his abusive behaviour, which led to her killing him when she was a girl. She meets young bartender Gem Morales, and goes on a date with him. Gem is abrasive, arrogant and forceful, which reminds her of her dead foster father. People on her home planet keep mistaking her for another woman of the same age who looks like her and who has a similar personality, a hint that she may have one or more twin sisters on the planet.

In the attic above her foster father's old bar, she finds more clues in an old photo album, which lead her to Cholwell's laboratory facilities. She goes to see Cholwell's estate, only to discover that his claim of raising "chickens" was a front for his human cloning experiments. Jean then learns the truth about her parentage: Cholwell created her and seven sisters in the laboratory 17 years ago. This explains Cholwell's surprise at meeting her on Earth and the mystery of her doppelgangers on Codrion. When Jean learns that one of her sisters has been convicted of her abusive foster father's murder, Jean reveals herself to the authorities. Fortunately, under Codrion law, the uncertainty over the murderers' identity leads to an acquittal.

== Reception ==
The Jean Parlier character was unusual for the 1950s, as she was a strong, independent female protagonist, and the story focuses on her (she is not the wife, girlfriend, or assistant of a male protagonist). While amoral, beautiful, and willing to use her looks and sex appeal to advance her goals, she does not fit the cliche femme fatale template popular in noir and hardboiled fiction of the era (note that in Cholwell's Chickens, the first half of the story has a noirish mystery-type feel). As well, even though she is the lead character, she was not simply a female version of a standard male hero archetype.
