= Ports of Call (Vance novel) =

1998 novel by Jack Vance

- Dust-jacket illustration from the first mass-market hardcover edition
- Author: Jack Vance
- Cover artist: Vladimir Nenov
- Language: English
- Series: Gaean Reach
- Genre: Science fiction
- Publisher: Tom Doherty
- Publication date: April 1998
- Publication place: United States
- Media type: Print (hardback & paperback)
- Pages: 294
- ISBN: 0-312-85801-9
- OCLC: 37513050
- Dewey Decimal: 813/.54 21
- LC Class: PS3572.A424 P67 1998
- Followed by: Lurulu

Ports of Call is a 1998 science fiction adventure novel by American writer Jack Vance. Followed by the novel Lurulu, it tells the story of a young man named Myron Tany on a picaresque journey through the Gaean Reach.

== Plot summary ==
Myron's family intended for Myron to follow a staid and respectable career in economics; however, when his wealthy and eccentric great-aunt Dame Hester came into possession of a space yacht, Myron suddenly found his long suppressed dreams of adventure within reach. Serving as Dame Hester's nominal captain on her journey to find a clinic reputed to restore lost youth to wealthy clients, Myron soon finds that his aunt is capricious as she is flamboyant, and after an argument, finds himself cast away on a remote planet. With no resources to return home, he obtains the position of supercargo on a tramp freighter, which enables him to travel further across the Gaean Reach to exotic lands.

== Reception ==
F&SF reviewer Elizabeth Hand praised Ports of Call as "delightful," declaring that "one enjoys Ports of Call as one does a Restoration comedy, for the sheer outrageous of its characters and the precision of Vance's often lunatic descriptive powers."
