= The Gray Prince =

1974 novel by Jack Vance

- First edition
- Author: Jack Vance
- Cover artist: Fred Samperi
- Language: English
- Genre: Science fiction
- Published: February 1975 Bobbs-Merrill
- Publication place: United States
- Media type: Print
- Pages: 191
- ISBN: 0-672-51994-1

The Gray Prince is a science fiction novel by American writer Jack Vance, first published in two parts in Amazing Science Fiction magazine (August and October 1974 issues) with the title The Domains of Koryphon. Given that the novel's setting, the planet Koryphon, is integral to the plot, The Gray Prince may be said to belong to the science fiction subgenre of the planetary romance. Also significant in this regard is the work's original title, The Domains of Koryphon, which gives prominence to the setting of the conflict narrated in the novel rather than to one of its many characters.

== Narrative ==
The conflict central to the plot arises from opposing claims to the land of the Alouan on the Uaia continent, with one side (the Uldras) asserting a right derived from original tenancy and the other (the Land Barons or "Outkers") a right based on the strength and determination to defend established property ownership, even if the property in question was originally stolen. Exploring the theme of barbarism versus civilisation, Vance would ultimately seem to argue that a societal mean is the most preferable of all possible worlds. The society of Szintarre has become over-civilised and proves too weak to defend itself when the erjins that the rights-obsessed city-dwellers hypocritically keep as slaves rise up against them. On the other hand, the Land Barons, who are in effect settled reavers and are rustic and quaint in comparison with urbane Szintarre society, nonetheless bring the benefits of civilisation (basic healthcare, education, reliable sources of drinking water, etc.) to the Uldras, curbing their more violent and barbarous customs, while otherwise allowing them to continue their traditional way of life unhindered.

=== Bildungsroman and initiatory journey ===
Jean-François Jamoul divides the narratives found in the novels of Jack Vance into two possible categories: the bildungsroman ("le roman de formation et d'expérience") and the initiatory journey ("le voyage initiatique"), citing Emphyrio, the Durdane trilogy, the Demon Princes series, and Maske: Thaery as examples of the former and the Tschai series as an example of the latter. The Gray Prince might be said to include the two different kinds of narrative within the same novel, with the same character as the protagonist of each. That character is Elvo Glissam, an independently wealthy young man, who arrives on Koryphon and in Szintarre becomes involved in one of the various political groups campaigning for the rights of the planet's natives. At a soirée, he accepts an invitation from Schaine Madduc, the daughter of a Land Baron, to visit her father's domain in the Alouan. On the way, their aircraft is shot down and the party embarks upon an arduous trek across the wilderness, during which they are attacked by both Uldra tribesmen and wild erjins. Glissam, an urbanite who has previously lived a life of ease, comes face to face with death and gains experience of life in the raw. Glissam meets the challenges and gives a good account of himself, but ultimately he refuses to relinquish the political beliefs that civilised society has inculcated in him. His initiatory journey takes place when he joins a quest to the Palga plateau undertaken by Gerd Jemasze, a Land Baron whose domain borders the Madducs', and Kurgech, a shaman of the Ao tribe resident on the Madducs' Morningswake estate. Jemasze and Kurgech are seeking the answer as to why Schaine's father, Uther, was murdered shortly after visiting the Palga and what was the secret, or "joke" as he referred to it, he discovered when he was there. The journey, which they make in one of the Wind Runners' sail wagons, takes them to a sacred forest. There, Kurgech engages in a battle of magic against the Wind Runner priests, assisted by Jemasze, but this is an initiatory test that the civilised Glissam fails: the Wind Runners are easily able to manipulate his thoughts by telepathic magic, until Jemasze breaks the spell for him. The three manage to escape and at the edge of the Palga plateau, bordering the Morningswake estate, they discover a hidden erjin temple carved from the solid rock. Here, Glissam fails yet again: under attack by the erjins, he despairs and allows himself to be shot, almost bringing disaster upon his two companions, who nonetheless manage to save him and bring him back to Morningswake. Uther Madduc's "joke" is that the erjins are not wild beasts but sentient beings and therefore have an earlier and better claim to the land than the Uldras, although by the same logic the only rightful owners of the planet are the indigenous morphotes.

== Setting ==
The planet Koryphon is part of Jack Vance's overarching Gaean Reach science-fiction setting, which he defines in the Prologue to The Gray Prince as follows: "the Gaean Reach encompasses a perceptible fraction of the galaxy. Trade routes thread space like capillaries in living tissue; thousands of worlds have been colonized, each different from every other, each working its specific change upon those men who live there. Never has the human race been less homogenous." The planet has two continents, Uaia to the north and Szintarre to the south, separated by the Persimmon Sea. The littoral of Uaia, known as the Alouan, is inhabited by the Uldras, consisting of various tribes, some of which signed the so-called Submission Treaties with the Land Barons two hundred years prior to the timeframe of the novel, while the others retained their own lands, known as the Retent. Szintarre is a long, narrow island, whose capital, Olanje, is a sophisticated, fashionable resort for Outkers ("out-worlders" in general) and also the seat of the planet's single organ of government, the Mull, which sits in Holrude House. The Mull is disdained by the Land Barons, who see it as "an organ for the production of inconsequential sophistry." The Retent Uldras, led by the Gray Prince, attempt to manipulate the Mull as a means of evicting the Land Barons, but otherwise reject all centralised authority. The Wind Runners of the Palga Plateau of the Uaia continent are ignorant of the very existence of the Mull.

=== The linguistic setting ===
As Jacques Chambon observes, the dialogue in almost all Vance's novels is understood to be an often approximate translation of a fictional language. We are given a glimpse of one such alien future language in the Prologue to The Gray Prince, where, in a footnote, the term Land Baron is said to be an unsatisfactory translation of "eng'sharatz (literally: the revered master of a large domain)". Elsewhere, one of the characters employs the term "weldewiste", which is explained in a footnote—also providing a metafictional rationale of Vance's own xenological approach—as "a word from the lexicon of social anthropology, to sum up a complicated idea comprising the attitude with which an individual confronts his environment [...] his character and personality from the purview of comparative culture." Other examples of "untranslatable" concepts that form part of the phenomenology of the alien cultures of Koryphon are the Uldra word "aurau" ("said of a tribesman afflicted with revulsion against civilized restrictions, and sometimes of a caged animal yearning for freedom") and "Sarai", the geographical name for the Windrunners' plateau, but suggestive of "a limitless expanse, horizon to horizon, of land or water, lacking all impediments or obstacle to travel and projecting an irresistible urgency to be on the way, to travel toward a known or unknown destination."

== Characters ==
- Schaine Madduc: daughter of land baron Uther Madduc, owner of the Morningswake domain. At the beginning of the novel she returns to Koryphon after an absence of five years, having been sent off-world to a school on the planet Tanquil by her father in order to nip in the bud an amorous relationship with Jorjol, an Uldra servant. During the course of the story she becomes attracted to the suave off-world Elvo Glissam, who rejects land baron society on principle, but ultimately she rejects him when she realises that she is too attached to the Morningswake domain and the way of life and privileges that come with it.
- Kelse Madduc: brother of Schaine Madduc and heir to the Morningswake domain. Five years prior to the opening of the novel, Kelse is mauled by a "native" erjin, losing an arm and a leg, which are replaced by prosthetic limbs. A rigid traditionalist, he organises the land barons into an association to counter political interference on the part of the planet's nominal government, the Mull, and to suppress the Uldra uprising.
- Gerd Jemasze: owner of the Suaniset domain, which borders Morningswake; a taciturn, self-reliant, strong and resourceful hero in the mould of Adam Reith (the protagonist of Vance's Tschai series). Jemasze safely guides Schaine, Kelse and Elvo Glissam across the perilous Alouan wilderness after their flyer is shot down by the Uldras and later undertakes an expedition to the Palga plateau to discover the mystery behind the murder of Uther Madduc.
- Elvo Glissam: a native of the planet Diamantha, he is now independently wealthy thanks to a lottery win. Arriving on Koryphon, he becomes involved in the Society for Emancipation of the Erjins. Falling in love with Schaine Madduc, he accepts her invitation to visit Morningswake, but gets more than he bargained for when their flyer is shot down, stranding them in the wilderness. Hoping to impress Schaine, he joins Gerd Jemasze and Kurgech on their journey to the Palga and barely escapes with his life.
- Jorjol: an Uldra orphan, originally of the Garganche tribe, who grew up with Schaine and Kelse Madduc on the Morningswake estate. Nicknamed Muffin in childhood, he is now the self-styled Gray Prince, a "messiah" who aims to unite the various Uldra tribes so that they might destroy the land barons and reclaim their ancestral lands. Consumed by resentment at his menial status within the Madduc household, he was responsible for Kelse's mauling in that he could have prevented it. Obsessed with possessing Schaine, he tries to kidnap her, but is thwarted by Gerd Jemasze.
- Valtrina Darabesq: aunt of Schaine and Kelse Madduc, society hostess in Olanje, the capital of Szintarre. Her famous parties at the Villa Mirasol are the setting for gatherings of Olanje's various groups dedicated to "liberation" of the Uldras.
- Glinth Isbane: Szintarre celebrity and secretary of the Society for a Free Szintarre.
- Reyona Werlas-Madduc: housekeeper at Morningswake, third cousin to Schaine and Kelse.
- Hermina Lingolet: cook at Morningswake, second cousin to Schaine and Kelse.
- Kurgech: shaman of the Ao tribe of Uldras resident on the Morningswake Domain. He accompanies Gerd Jemasze and Elvo Glissam on the mission to the Palga plateau and engages in a battle of magic with the Wind-runner priests of the Aluban forest.
- Julio Tanch: Uldra of the Ao tribe, head stockman on the Morningswake Domain.
- Lilo Stenbaren: baron of the Doradus Domain.
- Moffamides: treacherous Wind-runner priest from the No. 2 Depot at the edge of the Palga, supplier of "fiaps" (protective fetishes). Hypnotised by Kurgech using an Uldra "crazy-box", he leads Gerd Jemasze, Elvo Glissam and the Ao shaman to the secret erjin temple.
- Adare Jemasze: younger brother of Gerd.
- Ervan Collode: bombastic land baron who joins the expedition force to quell the uprising of the Retent Uldra tribes.
- Erris Sammatzen: Chairman of the Mull, the organ of all the folk of Koryphon, which sits at Holrude House. He aims to reconstruct the Domains and return the land to the Uldras.
- Adelys Lam, Thaddios Tarr, Julias Metheyr: members of the Mull, they are taken to the erjin temple, where they are confronted with conclusive evidence that their erjin domestics are in fact sentient and therefore slaves.
- Old Erjin: chief of the erjins, telepathically controls the erjin uprising in Szintarre.

== Plot summary ==
Schaine Madduc returns to Koryphon from school off-world, met by her brother Kelse. They and Gerd Jemasze are to meet their father, Uther, who has said he just learned something that is a splendid joke. An acquaintance, Elvo Glissam agrees to visit Uaia with them. However, Uther is ambushed and killed by Retent Uldras. Schaine, Kelse, Gerd, and Glissam survive a similar ambush and reach the Madducs' domain Morningswake.

Uther Madduc was exploring the Palga plateau before he was killed. Gerd, Glissam, and the Madducs' Uldra foreman Kurgech go into the Palga to discover what he found. After various encounters with the Wind-runners, they find the secret: an ancient temple built by Erjins, who are in fact fully sentient.

They return to Morningswake to learn that the Mull, the seat of government on the island continent of Szintarre, has ordered the land barons to give up their domains. The land barons defy this decree, and form their own Order of Uaia. The Uldra leader Jorjol, a childhood friend of the Madducs and the so-called Gray Prince, incites several hundred Retent Uldras to invade Morningswake. This attack is defeated by the Order's militia.

A committee of the Mull arrives at Morningswake. Gerd escorts them to the Erjin temple, where he explains the first part of Uther Madduc's joke. The Mull has demanded that the land barons yield to the claim of the Uldras, who were there first. But the temple shows that the Erjins are sentient, which makes the Szintarrese slaveowners.

Near the temple is the depot from which tamed Erjins are shipped. There they discover that the Erjin mounts and servitors exported by the Wind-runners are actually warriors, who at that very same moment are uprising and destroying their supposed masters. Erjin "servitors" seize control of Szintarre from its effete inhabitants. Erjin "mounts" turn on their Retent Uldra riders, but the combative Uldras defeat them. The Order of Uaia's militia (including Submission Uldras) fly south and defeat the Erjins in Szintarre. Returning to Uaia, they defeat a second and larger Uldra attack incited by Jorjol.

This experience chastens some of the Szintarrese reformers, but the others persist in their campaign. Now Gerd Jemasze reveals the rest of Uther Madduc's joke. The temple shows that the Erjins were there before the Uldras, so they have an even better claim to the land. Furthermore, the temple's decorations depict Erjins arriving in spaceships and in combat with the semi-intelligent Morphotes: the Morphotes are in fact the original inhabitants of Koryphon and "rightful" claimants to the land.

Gerd, speaking for the land barons, tells the Szintarrese that to be consistent they should either revoke their decree against the land barons, or else give their own country to the Morphotes as well.

== Publication history ==
After the two-part serialization of The Domains of Koryphon in Amazing Science Fiction in 1974, the novel was published in hardback with the new title The Gray Prince by Bobbs-Merrill in February 1975. A paperback edition of The Gray Prince was brought out by Avon in December of the same year. A second paperback edition was published by Coronet in May 1976, reprinted in 1982. Specialist science-fiction imprint DAW published an edition in 1982. The novel reverted to its original title of The Domains of Koryphon when it was published as volume 28 of the Vance Integral Edition in 2002. The most recent republication of the novel was in 2008, as part of The Jack Vance Reader, edited by Terry Dowling and Jonathan Strahan and published by Subterranean Press. The Jack Vance Reader also includes the novels Emphyrio and The Languages of Pao, with prefaces by Robert Silverberg, Ursula K. Le Guin, and Mike Resnick (to The Domains of Koryphon).
