= Ecce and Old Earth =

1991 novel by Jack Vance

- Cover of the first edition Cover art by Vincent Di Fate
- Author: Jack Vance
- Series: Cadwal Chronicles
- Genre: Science fiction
- Publisher: Underwood-Miller
- Publication date: 1991
- Preceded by: Araminta Station
- Followed by: Throy

Ecce and Old Earth is a 1991 science fiction novel by American writer Jack Vance, the second novel in the Cadwal Chronicles trilogy, set in Vance's Gaean Reach. It follows Araminta Station (1987) and precedes Throy (1992).

== Plot summary ==
Glawen Clattuc has learned that his father, Scharde, is being held prisoner by an old personal enemy, Smonny Clattuc. Scharde and others who have earned Smonny's wrath are trapped on the unsettled continent of Ecce, which is teeming with very dangerous animals. Glawen rescues Scharde, Eustace Chilke and another prisoner who proves to be a treasure trove of very important information. Bureau B, the security arm of the Conservancy government, then liberates the rest of the inmates.

Meanwhile, Wayness Tamm (Glawen's romantic interest) is busy trying to track down the all-important missing Charter, which confers ownership of the planet Cadwal. The trail leads from Earth to various other planets. She is not alone on this quest however; two factions working to overthrow the Conservancy also seek the document and will go to any lengths to secure it. Glawen eventually discovers that her letters to him have been intercepted, and sets out after her.
