= Trullion: Alastor 2262 =

1973 novel by Jack Vance

- First edition
- Author: Jack Vance
- Illustrator: Gene Szafram
- Language: English
- Series: Gaean Reach
- Genre: Science fiction
- Publisher: Ballantine
- Publication date: 1973
- Publication place: United States
- Media type: Print (Hardback), mass-market paperback
- Pages: 247
- ISBN: 0-345-03308-6
- OCLC: 1624819
- Followed by: Marune: Alastor 933

Trullion: Alastor 2262 (1973) is a science fiction novel by American writer Jack Vance, first published by Ballantine Books. It is one of three books set in the Alastor Cluster, "a whorl of thirty thousand live stars in an irregular volume twenty to thirty light-years in diameter." Three thousand star systems are inhabited by five trillion humans, who are governed by the mostly hands-off Connatic. Occasionally, in the manner of Harun al-Rashid of The Thousand and One Nights, the Connatic travels in disguise among the people.

Trullion: Alastor 2262 first appeared in serialized format in the March and June 1973 issues of Amazing Science Fiction magazine. It was issued in paperback book format in June 1973 by Ballantine Books.

== Plot summary ==
A planet in the Alastor Cluster, Trullion is a bucolic place, inhabited by generally unambitious, somewhat hedonistic Trills, as the resident humans call themselves. Other inhabitants include the nomadic Trevanyi, a generally despised gypsy-like people, and Merlings, hostile semi-intelligent indigenous beings who keep to the water.

Glinnes Hulden returns to Trullion after ten years of service in the Whelm, the Connatic's military force. Glinnes' older brother Shira is missing, so being an hour older than his sullen twin brother Glay, he finds himself the owner of the family holdings. However, while he was away, Glay had sold a choice island to an off-worlder, Lute Casagave. Glinnes wants the land back, but cannot come up with the 12,000 ozols, since Glay had already spent the proceeds. After an argument, Glay moves out. His mother also leaves, to go live with Akadie, a professional consultant and mentor.

Glinnes evicts a Trevanyi family whom Glay invited to camp on Hulden land. Later, they take revenge by ambushing him, robbing him of his life savings and leaving him unconscious for the merlings to kill. Fortunately, he wakes up before that can happen.

Glinnes learns that the local, somewhat-impoverished aristocrat, Lord Gensifer, is recruiting a professional team to play hussade. The object is to grasp the golden ring attached to the clothing of the other team's sheirl, who must be a virgin. A ransom is paid and play resumes, but when a team runs out of funds, the ring is pulled and the sheirl's clothing falls away in full view of the spectators. Seeing an opportunity to earn the ozols that he needs, Glinnes joins the "Gorgons". However, Gensifer insists on being the team captain. Several matches show that he is exceptionally inept; Glinnes and the rest of the better players quit in disgust.

Their last opponent, the "Tanchineros", is a team whose strengths match the weaknesses of the Gorgons and vice versa. Glinnes and his fellow Gorgons are recruited, and a strong team is born. Duissane, a member of the Trevanyi family Glinnes evicted, agrees to be their sheirl. The new Tanchineros are successful immediately, winning and playing ever-better teams for more money. Finally, Glinnes jokingly challenges Lord Gensifer to a match. Surprisingly, Gensifer accepts.

Gensifer unveils a whole new team for the match, an excellent touring team from off-world, but the Tanchineros are prepared. The teams are evenly matched, except in one respect: in his vanity, Gensifer has taken over as captain. The Tanchineros take advantage of this weakness. However, as Glinnes is grasping the opposing sheirl's gold ring for the final time, a notorious starmenter (space pirate) named Sagmondo Bandolio seizes the stadium and kidnaps three hundred of the wealthiest spectators for ransom, as well as several hundred women for other, darker purposes.

Glinnes escapes with both sheirls. They hide out on a deserted island. One sheirl is grateful for her rescue, but Duissane is disgusted and leaves in the boat. The remaining sheirl suggests that perhaps Duissane is in love with Glinnes.

When they are finally rescued, Glinnes learns that Akadie has been assigned to collect the enormous ransom demanded. Glinnes reluctantly agrees to hold onto it when Akadie fears being robbed. Duissane spends the night with Glinnes, believing that he will steal the money and take her off-world to live a life of luxury. However, Glinnes had, out of curiosity, already opened the package and found worthless papers inside; Akadie had apparently used him as a decoy. Duissane leaves, extremely distraught by this revelation. After she has gone, Glinnes notices that the ransom was actually hidden under the papers. Akadie picks up the money and gives it to Bandolio's man.

Shortly afterwards, the Whelm finds Bandolio's hideout and captures him, but the ransom is not found and many suspect that Akadie still has it. Glinnes, through diligent investigation, finds the money in a locker. The courier was killed before he could deliver it, apparently by the inside man who arranged the mass kidnapping with Bandolio. Glinnes also deduces the identity of Bandolio's partner.

Rhyl Shermatz, a self-styled "wandering journalist," is revealed to be an important government official. Glinnes convinces him to bring Bandolio to Lord Gensifer's wedding to Duissane. While there, he encounters Lute Casagave. When Bandolio gleefully identifies him as a retired, rival starmenter, Glinnes unexpectedly gets back his island. However, he is not the man Glinnes came to unmask. That turns out to be the groom. Gensifer flees, but tumbles into the water and falls victim to the merlings. Shermatz (in reality the Connatic) strongly suspects that Glinnes has the ransom, but has no strong motivation to pursue the issue. Everyone else believes the money is lost for good. Duissane, her plans derailed once again, wanders away disconsolate. Glinnes follows her.

== Themes ==
Trullion: Alastor 2262 introduces many thematic elements that would later become common background in his subsequent “Alastor” series of novels, as well as the more loosely organized novels set in the Gaean Reach. One of these concepts is the game of Hussade. Hussade is a team game played throughout the Alastor Cluster: it is mentioned in all three Alastor Cluster novels and also glancingly referred to in some of Vance's other ‘Gaean Reach’ novels, but only in Trullion is it a major element in the story. The term starmenter for pirate, and the use of the term ozol for a unit of money also first make their appearance in this novel.

Themes reflected from previous works include the use of sacred trees as a burial ground by the Trevanyi, which is an echo from Vance’s early novellas, such as Son of the Tree, and would reappear in later works, such as The Gray Prince and Maske: Thaery.

== Hussade ==
The object of the game is to strip the opposing team’s sheirl: a virgin girl of striking beauty regarded as mascot, trophy and inspirer by her side. When a player reaches the sheirl, play stops while his team demands a ransom from the sheirl's team; either the ransom is paid and the game resumes, or the sheirl is stripped (and, deprived of symbolic virginity, disqualified from acting as sheirl in future games) and the game ends.

According to Vance:

The hussade field is a gridiron of 'runs' (also called 'ways') and ‘laterals' above a tank of water four feet deep. The runs are nine feet apart, the laterals twelve feet. Trapezes permit the players to swing sideways from run to run, but not from lateral to lateral. The central moat is eight feet wide and can be passed at either end, at the center, or jumped if the player is sufficiently agile. The 'home' tanks at either end of the field flank the platform on which stands the sheirl.

Players buff or body-block opposing players into the tanks, but may not use their hands to push, pull, hold, or tackle. The captain of each team carries the 'hange' - a bulb on a three-foot pedestal. When the light glows the captain may not be attacked, nor may he attack. When he moves six feet from the hange, or when he lifts the hange to shift his position, the light goes dead; he may then attack and be attacked. An extremely strong captain may almost ignore his hange; a captain less able stations himself on a key junction, which he is then able to protect by virtue of his impregnability within the area of the live hange.

The sheirl stands on her platform at the end of the field between the home tanks. She wears a white gown with a gold ring at the front. The enemy players seek to lay hold of this gold ring; a single pull denudes the sheirl. The dignity of the sheirl may be ransomed by her captain for five hundred ozols, a thousand, two thousand, or higher, in accordance with a prearranged schedule.

The ozol is a monetary unit that appears in many of Vance's books, not confined to the Alastor and Gaean Reach novels.

== Awards ==
Trullion: Alastor 2262 placed sixth in the annual Locus Poll for Best SF Novel of 1973.

== Sources ==
- Underwood, Tim; Chuck Miller (1980). Jack Vance. New York: Taplinger Publishing Company. p. 228. ISBN 0-8008-4295-2.
