= The House on Lily Street =

1979 novel by Jack Vance

The House on Lily Street: A Murder Mystery
- First edition
- Author: Jack Vance
- Cover artist: Stephen Fabian
- Language: English
- Genre: Mystery
- Set in: Oakland, California
- Publisher: Underwood-Miller
- Publication date: January 1979
- Publication place: United States
- Media type: Print
- Pages: 195
- OCLC: 6145064
- Dewey Decimal: 813.54

The House on Lily Street is a novel by American author Jack Vance. It was published in the United States by Underwood-Miller in 1979 and again in 2002 as part of the Vance Integral Edition (VIE).

== Plot introduction ==
A police detective investigates the murder of a solipsistic social worker who had sought the identity of the mysterious "Mr. Big", an extortionist who threatens welfare cheats with exposure unless he is paid off.

== Publication history ==
First published in January 1979 by Underwood Miller, although believed to have been written in 1958 (http://www.integralarchive.org/biblio-2.htm)
