= Araminta Station =

1987 novel by Jack Vance

- Cover of the first edition Cover art by Vincent Di Fate
- Author: Jack Vance
- Series: Cadwal Chronicles
- Genre: Science fiction
- Publisher: Underwood-Miller
- Publication date: 1987
- Followed by: Ecce and Old Earth

Araminta Station is a 1987 science fiction novel by the American writer Jack Vance. It is the first part of the Cadwal Chronicles, a trilogy set in the Gaean Reach, the other two novels being Ecce and Old Earth (1991) and Throy (1992).

== Setting ==
The planet Cadwal is discovered by a member of the "Naturalist Society of Earth". To preserve its natural beauty, the society sets up a Charter to minimize human exploitation. Six bureaus are established, each with a staff of 20 women and 20 men under the leadership of the Conservator, to maintain the Conservancy.

There are three major continents: Ecce, Deucas and Throy. Araminta Station, the main settlement, is located on Deucas, the continent most hospitable to humans. With society members constantly visiting (and often remaining) for "research" purposes, an additional settlement was grudgingly set up at Stroma on Throy.

From the earliest days, the bureau heads recruited close relations and associates for their staffs. Inevitably, the number of family members grew to exceed the Charter limits. On a person's 21st birthday, they are either granted "Agency status", if there is a vacancy and they pass the exams, or they become a "collateral", with much lower status and prospects. Thus, the society of Cadwal is a highly stratified aristocracy, where birth matters much more than aptitude.

In addition to the collaterals, another group not envisioned by the Charter resides on the planet under the same transparent fiction of being "temporary" laborers: the Yips, "descendents of runaway servants, illegal immigrants and others". Yips are issued six-month work permits. Once these expire, however, they are sent back to overcrowded Yipton on Lutwin Atoll. The Yips present a grave social problem to the "permanent" residents, whom they greatly outnumber, and it is no secret that they would like to occupy Deucas.

== Plot summary ==
The novel centers on Glawen Clattuc, an intelligent, capable young man. Glawen's father Scharde foils an attempt by an old family enemy, Spanchetta Clattuc, to falsely inflate Glawen's "index number" and thereby reduce his chances of achieving Agency status. He joins Bureau B, the department responsible for enforcing the laws of the Charter.

Glawen becomes romantically involved with the beautiful Sessily Veder. When Sessily disappears, an investigation suggests she was raped and murdered, her body shipped off-planet in a wine cask. However, there is insufficient evidence to convict the primary suspect, Spanchetta's son Arles.

Later, Glawen becomes acquainted with and attracted to Wayness Tamm, the daughter of the new Conservator. Glawen saves Wayness from a rape attempt by Arles. Then, after the murder of her brother (engineered by a Yip), Wayness reveals to Glawen that while she was visiting Earth, her father's cousin became the secretary of the nearly moribund Naturalist Society and discovered that the Charter was missing (a previous secretary had been a thief and sold the society's assets). Whoever possesses it is the legal owner of Cadwal. She decides to return alone to Earth to search for it.

Glawen is ordered by Bureau B chief Bodwyn Wook to join the Bold Lions (a boisterous drinking club for devil-may-care youths) and travel to Yipton with them on an annual jaunt, using the opportunity to spy on the Yips. He is accompanied by Kirdy Wook, a Bold Lion and also a Bureau B agent. Glawen discovers that the Yips are secretly assembling a flyer (a flying vehicle), most likely to further their goal of seizing Deucas. However, Glawen is spotted. He gets away, but Kirdy is caught and tortured by the Yips. With great difficulty, Bodwyn Wook secures his release. Although Kirdy recovers physically, his mind is severely affected, and Glawen senses that Kirdy nurtures an intense irrational hatred for him.

Glawen travels to a small island for a holiday. To his horror, he discovers that "parties" are being held there in which rich off-worlders are allowed to have their way with young Yip girls, who are then killed. An outraged Bodwyn Wook has them arrested, but is persuaded to allow the wealthy prisoners to pay very large fines instead of being executed in order to pay for desperately needed flyers and weapons to counter the Yip threat.

He sends Glawen off-world to discover the identity of the organizers and, to Glawen's disquiet, orders that Kirdy accompany him. Kirdy eventually betrays Glawen, who is imprisoned by a sect which believes in total equality of the sexes. Their extreme stance has led to a declining population. Their leader informs Glawen that he is to be a sex slave to remedy the situation. It turns out some of the sect members had participated in the "parties" in a prior attempt to solve their dilemma. After six months, Glawen manages to escape and shut down the sect.

He then returns to Cadwal and finally identifies Sessily's murderer: Kirdy Wook. Kirdy had been jealous of Glawen from childhood. Kirdy attempts to kill Glawen on a beach, but Glawen lures him out into the water; a weak swimmer, Kirdy is dragged out to sea by the undertow and drowns.

Glawen has also uncovered the organizer of the sex parties. Floreste is an dramatist who will go to any lengths to fund his dream: the construction of a magnificent new Orpheum. Condemned to death, Floreste refuses to divulge any information until Glawen threatens to sue and seize his hard-won funds as damages. Glawen's father Scharde, a senior Bureau B agent, is missing and presumed dead in an accident while on patrol, but Floreste confirms that he is actually a prisoner. He also inadvertently gives Glawen startling news as to who is really leading the Yips.
