= Lurulu =

2004 novel by Jack Vance

- Author: Jack Vance
- Cover artist: John Harris
- Language: English
- Series: Gaean Reach
- Genre: Science fiction novel
- Publisher: Tor Books
- Publication date: 2004
- Publication place: United States
- Media type: Print (Paperback)
- Pages: 208
- ISBN: 0-312-87279-8
- OCLC: 55016369
- LC Class: PS3572.A424 L87 2004
- Preceded by: Ports of Call

Lurulu is a science fiction adventure novel by Jack Vance. Published in 2004 by Tor, it was his last novel. It is the follow-up to Ports of Call and continues to follow the character Myron Tany on his picaresque journey through the Gaean Reach region of space.

== Background ==
In Ports of Call, Myron is a young man who turned away from his family's safe middle class lifestyle to seek adventure in space. He joins a wealthy relative, great-aunt Dame Hester, on her space yacht voyage. After an argument, she strands him as a castaway on a remote planet. With no money, he gets passage as crew member on a tramp freighter-spaceship, which enables him to travel further across the Gaean Reach region of space and see exotic planets.

== Plot ==
In Lurulu, Myron continues in his role as crewman of the space freighter, the Glicca, under Captain Adair Maloof. The Glicca is crewed by an eccentric mix of picaresque rogues, pilgrims and intellectuals. The crew are searching for the mysterious "lurulu", "a special word from the language of myth," that refers to a sense of longing. The tramp freighter continues to take on and deliver cargoes and the crew explore the nightlife of exotic space ports on worlds ranging from orderly planets to rough, lawless Wild West-style ports.

As the story opens, the freighter is in the beautiful planet Fluter, settled by colonists only a thousand years ago who came from crowded concrete-built cities that they vowed not to recreate in their new home. Fluter's development has been therefore limited to 147 villages and a spaceport. The freighter next goes to Naharius, a sparsely populated planet with wooded vales whose lovely mountain springs are reputed to be a fountain of youth, which attracts tourists from many planets. Myron looks for his great-aunt Hester at the expensive clinics without success. Finally, in a crowded concrete hospice, he finds his great-aunt lying gaunt and weak in a cot. She tells him that con men offering an anti-aging treatment took her money and left her to die. After her death, Myron becomes wealthy due to her will, but he stays on with his Glicca crewmates. He lives in a luxurious home, and the Glicca is upgraded and overhauled. Myron meets a former love interest, a young woman named Tibbet who is now married.
