= Throy =

1992 novel by Jack Vance

- Cover of the first edition Cover art by Vincent Di Fate
- Author: Jack Vance
- Series: Cadwal Chronicles
- Genre: Science fiction
- Publisher: Underwood-Miller
- Publication date: 1992
- Preceded by: Ecce and Old Earth

Throy is a 1992 science fiction novel by American writer Jack Vance, the final work in the Cadwal Chronicles, a trilogy set in Vance's Gaean Reach. The preceding novels are Araminta Station (1987) and Ecce and Old Earth (1991).

== Plot summary ==
By this point, Bureau B has identified the two factions seeking to overthrow the Conservancy that protects and administers the nearly unspoiled planet Cadwal. Smonny Clattuc controls the Yips through her compliant husband, Titus Pompo. By chance, Titus resembles Calyactus, the former Yip leader. Calyactus was disposed of and replaced by Titus. Smonny seeks vengeance for having to leave Cadwal, even though it was her own laziness that caused her to fail to achieve Agency status. The other faction is the Life, Peace and Freedom party (LPF), led by Dame Clytie Vergence. Initially the LPFers idealistically sought to free the Yips from their sorry state, but now their goal is to create large country estates for themselves, keeping some of the Yips as servants.

Egon Tamm, the Conservator, announces that the old Charter governing Cadwal (which was found through the efforts of Glawen Clattuc and Wayness Tamm) has been superseded by a new, somewhat stricter one. However, Bureau B is under no illusions that the danger has been averted. Glawen Clattuc is sent off-world with Eustace Chilke to feel out Lewyn Barduys, a construction magnate who had been seen talking with Dame Clytie. Bureau B fears that Barduys will be persuaded to provide enough transportation for the Yips to burst out of their severely overcrowded atoll and overwhelm the Conservancy with their vastly greater numbers.

When Glawen finally tracks Barduys down, he and Chilke arrive just in time to save the man's life. Barduys had had unsatisfactory business dealings with Namour Clattuc, Smonny's lieutenant and lover. Namour decided the best way to deal with the matter was to shoot Barduys and leave the gravely injured man to die or be killed by the hostile alien natives. After Barduys recovers, he has strong reasons to aid Glawen and the Conservancy. He arranges for a face-to-face summit meeting with Smonny and Dame Clytie, supposedly to settle the details of their plan. The two women have very different goals and ideas of who is to be in overall charge, and soon come to furious blows.

As a result, Smonny sends Yips with demolition charges to send the settlement of Stroma crashing into the fjord below. Dame Clytie and the rest of the LPF leadership were not at home, but their families and their ancient homes have been wiped out. Thirsting for revenge, they attack Yipton with their two gunships, killing most of the Yips.

The LPFers are caught while trying to leave the planet, and are sentenced to death. Smonny, Namour and Spanchetta Clattuc (guilty of harboring the other two and also of having Glawen's mother murdered many years before) are also found. The trio are marooned in Smonny's own isolated compound on the dangerous, uninhabited continent of Ecce. Barduys resettles the surviving Yips on another planet, finally ending the threat to the Conservancy.
