= Son of the Tree =

1951 novella by Jack Vance

- Cover of the first edition.
- Author: Jack Vance
- Language: English
- Genre: Science fiction
- Publisher: Ace Books
- Publication date: 1951
- Publication place: United States
- Media type: Print (Paperback)

Son of the Tree is a science fiction novella by American writer Jack Vance. It was first published in the June 1951 issue of Thrilling Wonder Stories magazine and in book form as half of an Ace Double in 1964, together with The Houses of Iszm. The version that appears in the Ace Double is still less than novel length at about 31,000 words, but is essentially the same as the original magazine version. Son of the Tree was re-published as a stand-alone volume in 1974 by Mayflower. One of Vance's earliest efforts, and part science fiction, part espionage story, the protagonist has to contend with the machinations of various alien societies in his search for a man.

== Plot summary ==
Joe Smith arrives on the planet Kyril, so distant that Earth is but a myth. He is doggedly searching for Harry Creath, his romantic rival for a woman back on Earth. Kyril is a theocracy, in which two million Druids rule over five billion peasant Laity, all of whom worship the "Tree of Life", a huge tree with a trunk five miles in diameter and twelve miles high, and yearn to join with it. The Druids are xenophobic, and consider Joe to be a spy. For unknown reasons, he is befriended by Hableyat, a self-admitted spy of the rival world Mangtse, who finds him a job as chauffeur for the Thearch of the District.

Later, he is summoned by Priestess Elfane, a daughter of the Thearch, and the high-ranking Druid Manaolo. They want him to help dispose of the corpse of the Mangtse ambassador before it is discovered. A chance remark reveals that afterwards they intend to kill him, so he refuses to drive them, instead extracting a bribe for his silence. Joe spots Hableyat watching nearby. Joe becomes a prime suspect in the murder, which was actually committed by Hableyat; Hableyat is a member of the Bluewater faction, the ambassador of one of the arch-rival Red-streams.

Hableyat helps him escape on the spaceship Belsaurion, bound for Ballenkarch, last known location of Harry Creath. His fellow passengers include Hableyat, Manaolo and Elfane. Joe tries to extract himself from the political schemes of Kyril and Mangtse. During the voyage, he survives a couple of murder attempts, fights with Manaolo, and finds himself attracted to Elfane. When they arrive, Joe finds to his surprise that Harry Creath has made himself the ruling prince of Ballenkarch, with the woman he left behind on Earth as his princess. However, his biggest shock is yet to come, when he discovers the horrific true nature of the so-called Tree of Life.

Elfane and Manaolo have brought an offspring of the Tree of Life to secretly plant on Ballenkarch. The plant captures and consumes several people (back on Kyril, deluded Laity eagerly give themselves to its parent by the thousands each day). Bursts from energy weapons only help it grow more quickly. However, herbicide weakens it to the point it can be killed. Hableyat's faction has fallen from power, but Harry Creath gives him a large quantity of herbicide, giving him the opportunity to score a coup by killing the Tree of Life.

== Major themes ==
The theme of trees with special powers connected to a religious sect recurs in a number of Vance's works, including The Houses of Iszm (where trees are the center of a society, similar to Kyril), Maske: Thaery (where “Druids” tend trees with extreme devotion) and The Gray Prince (where a race of natives worship trees, which they climb to die). The theme of a religious orthodoxy dominating a society to its detriment is also in many of Vance's earlier works.

== Sources ==
- Underwood, Tim; Chuck Miller (1980). Jack Vance. New York: Taplinger Publishing Company. pp. 228. ISBN 0-8008-4295-2.
