= Tramp trade =

Cargo shipping without a fixed schedule

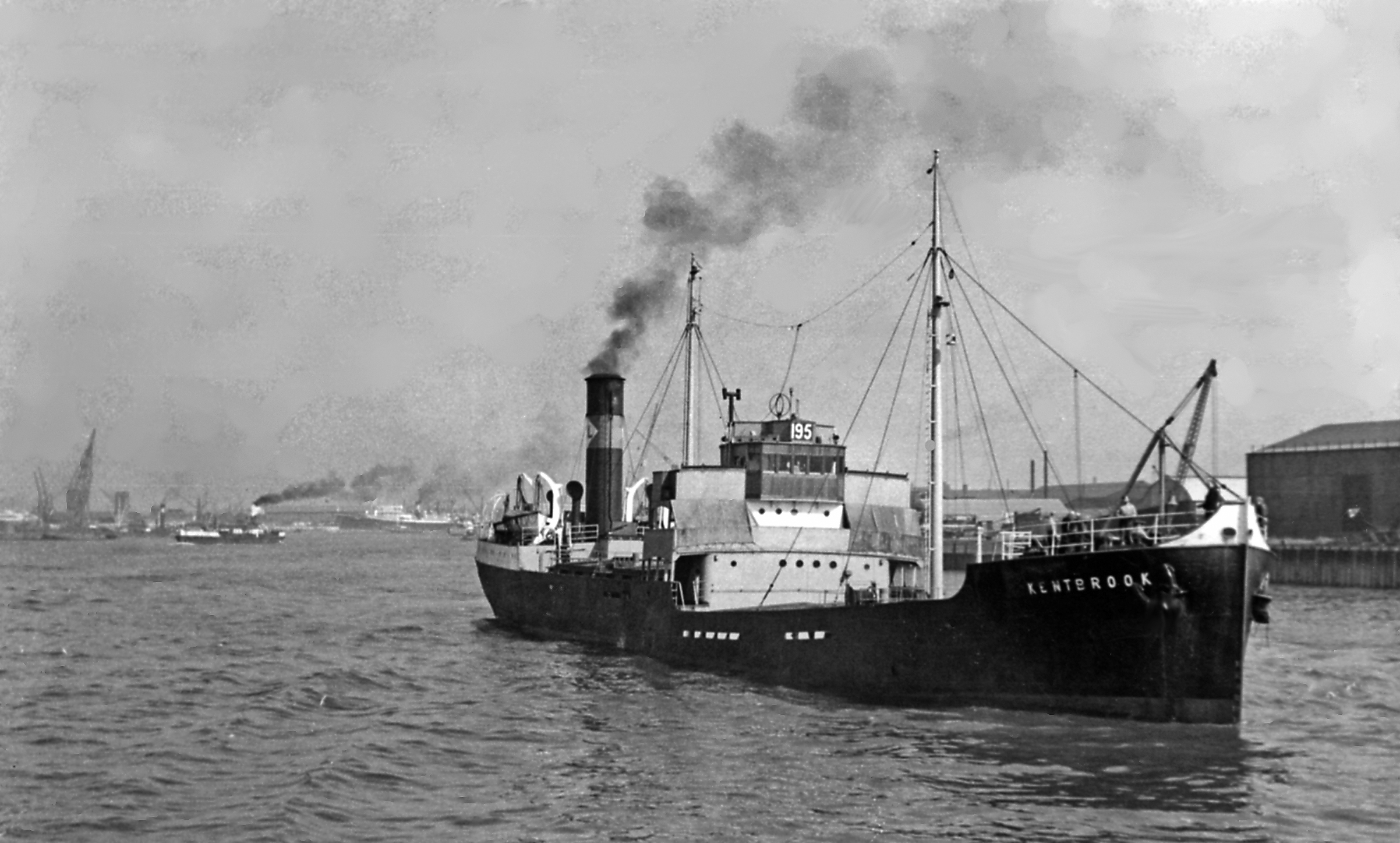
A tramp freighter in 1950

A boat or ship engaged in the tramp trade is one which does not have a fixed schedule, itinerary nor published ports of call, and trades on the spot market as opposed to freight liners. A steamship engaged in the tramp trade is sometimes called a tramp steamer; similar terms, such as tramp freighter and tramper, are also used. Chartering is done chiefly on London, New York, and Singapore shipbroking exchanges. The Baltic Exchange serves as a type of stock market index for the trade.

The term tramper is derived from the British meaning of "tramp", as being an itinerant beggar or vagrant. In this context, it was first documented in the 1880s, along with "ocean tramp" (at the time many sailing vessels engaged in irregular trade as well).

== History ==
The tramp trade first took off in Britain around the mid-19th century. The dependability and timeliness of steam ships was found to be more cost-effective than sail. Coal was needed for ships' boilers, and the demand created a business opportunity for moving large amounts of best Welsh coal to various seaports in Britain. Within a few years tramp ships became the workhorses of trade, transporting coal and finished products from British cities to the rest of the world.

The size of tramp ships remained relatively constant from 1900 to 1940, at about 7,000 to 10,000 deadweight tons (dwt.). During the Second World War, the United States created the Liberty Ship, a single design that could be used to carry just about anything, and which weighed in at 10,500 dwt. The U.S. produced 2,708 Liberty Ships and they were used on every international trade route.

After the Second World War, economies of scale took over and the size of tramp ships exploded to keep up with a booming supply and demand cycle. During that time the bulk carrier became the tramp of choice for many owners and operators. Bulk carriers were designed to carry coal, grain and ore, which gave them more flexibility and could service more ports than some of their predecessors, which only carried a single commodity.

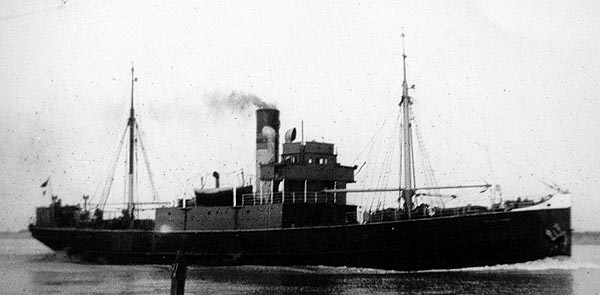
The SS Felixstowe, which was built in 1918, served as a tramp steamer until the 1940s.

Today, the tramp trade includes all types of vessels, from bulk carriers to tankers. Each can be used for a specific market, or ships can be combined, such as oil or bulk carriers, to accommodate many different markets, depending where the ship is located and the supply and demand of the area. Tramp ships often carry their own gear, such as booms, cranes and derricks, in case the ports they use lack suitable equipment for loading or discharging cargo.

== Tramp charters ==
The tramp ship is a contract carrier. Unlike a liner, often called a common carrier, which has a fixed schedule and a published tariff, the ideal tramp can carry anything to anywhere, and freight rates are influenced by supply and demand. To generate business, a contract to lease the vessel known as a charterparty is drawn up between the ship owner and the charterer. There are three types of charters: voyage, time, and demise.

=== Voyage charter ===
The voyage charter is the most common charter in tramp shipping. The owner of the tramp is obligated to provide a seaworthy ship while the charterer is obligated to provide a full load of cargo. This type of charter is the most lucrative, but can be the riskiest due to lack of new charterers. During a voyage charter a part or all of a vessel is leased to the charterer for a voyage to a port or a set of different ports. There are two types of voyage charter – net form and gross form.

Under the net form, the cargo a tramp ship carries is loaded, discharged, and trimmed at the charterer's expense. Under the gross form the expense of cargo loading, discharging and trimming is on the owner. The charterer is only responsible to provide the cargo at a specified port and to accept it at the destination port. Time becomes an issue in the voyage charter if the tramp ship is late in her schedule or loading or discharging are delayed. If a tramp ship is delayed the charterer pays demurrage, which is a penalty, to the ship owner. The number of days a tramp ship is chartered for is called lay days.

=== Time charter ===
In a time charter, the owner provides a vessel that is fully crewed and equipped. The owner provides the crew, but the crew takes orders from the charterer. The owner is also responsible for insuring the vessel, repairs the vessel may need, engine parts and food for the ship's personnel. The charterer is responsible for everything else. The main advantage of the time charter is that it diverts the costs of running a ship to the charterer.

=== Demise charter ===
The demise charter, also called " bareboat" charter, is the least used in the tramp trade. The ship owner only provides a ship devoid of any crew, stores, or fuel. It is the charterer's responsibility to provide everything the ship will need. The ship owner must provide a seaworthy vessel, but once the charterer accepts the vessel, the responsibility of seaworthiness is the charterer's. The charterer crews the vessel, but the owner can make recommendations. There are no standardized forms in a demise charter, contracts can vary greatly, and are written up to meet the needs of the charterer.

== Brokerage ==
Tramp ship owners and tramp ship charterers rely on brokers to find cargoes for their ships to carry. A broker understands international trade conditions, the movements of goods, market prices and the availability of the owner's ships.

The Baltic Exchange, in London, is the physical headquarters for tramp ship brokerage. The Baltic Exchange works like an organised market and provides a meeting place for ship owners, brokers and charterers. It also provides easy access to information on market fluctuations and commodity prices to all the parties involved. Brokers can use it to quickly match a cargo to a ship or ship to a cargo depending on whom they are working for. A committee of owners, brokers and charterers are elected to manage the exchange to ensure everyone's interests are represented. With the speed of today's communications the floor of the Baltic Exchange is not nearly as populated as it once was, but the information and networking the exchange provides is still an asset to the tramp trade.

== 2000s ==
Due to the explosion of liner services, and in large part, due to containerisation since the 1960s, the tramp trade has decreased, but is by no means ended. A contemporary trend in the shipping business has resulted in renewed interest in tramp shipping. To increase profits, some liner companies are investing in tramp ships to create a buffer when the market is down. For example, Mitsui OSK Lines possesses a large fleet with both tramp ships and liners. With both types of shipping covered they are able to serve a world economy even in a down market.

The advantage of tramp ships is they are relied upon at a moment's notice to serve any type of market. Even in an economic downturn, there will be a market for some type of commodity somewhere, and the company with the ships able to exploit that market will do better than the company relying on liner services alone.

== Companies ==
- United Maritime Group
- Seabulk
- D/S Norden
- TORM

== In fiction ==
Tramp steamers and freighters are associated with off-the-beaten track, romanticized adventure and intrigue in pulp stories, children's books, novels, films, and other fictional works. When characters such as spies or resistance fighters are on the run, or lovers are fleeing from an affair gone wrong, tramp steamers are used to slip in or out of a country. The crew of a tramp steamer is often a picaresque mix of societal outcasts and rogues with colourful (or even illegal-activity-filled) pasts who cannot or who do not want to work elsewhere.

Steamers are often depicted as operating in a grey area of legality, both in terms of their lax observance of steamship safety regulations and their plying of black market trades and smuggling of goods and passengers. Fiction writers depicted tramp steamers as a way that penniless adventurers can explore exotic ports by being taken on as a crew member.

=== Examples ===
- In the film The Lost Continent (1968), a dilapidated tramp steamer Corita is smuggling a dangerous explosive cargo. The Captain ignores a customs launch wanting to inspect his ship as he is smuggling white phosphorus. Some passengers are trying to escape their past indiscretions or eluding capture (one with stolen bearer bonds).
- In the film The Long Voyage Home (1940), a British tramp steamer SS Glencairn goes from the West Indies to Baltimore and then finally to England. The crew is a motley, fun-loving, hard-drinking lot who are smuggling rum. The crew thinks one aloof crew member might be a German spy because he is so secretive and he has a locked box under his bed.
- In the film The African Queen (1951), a tramp steamer, the African Queen, is converted into a torpedo boat to sink a German gunboat.
- In the 1937 musical comedy film Something to Sing About, hoofer Terry Rooney (James Cagney) takes his bride, singer Rita Wyatt (Evelyn Daw) on a tramp steamer for their honeymoon. They are the only passengers. Rooney is turning his back on Hollywood, disgusted by his experience working on one picture. The film is a hit, but no one can find him. When the ship returns at last to San Francisco, he discovers that he is Hollywood's newest star. There is a long scene aboard ship where the crew joins in a talent show.
- Much of the action in Across the Pacific, a 1942 spy film set in the three weeks before the attack on Pearl Harbor, takes place aboard the Genoa Maru, a fictional Japanese cargo ship. The passengers include: former Captain Rick Leland (Humphrey Bogart), a disgraced United States Army Coast Artillery Corps, working as a secret U.S. agent; Canadian Alberta Marlow (Mary Astor) who claims to be from Medicine Hat; and Dr. Lorenz (Sydney Greenstreet) a great admirer of the Japanese. Characters spar over the dinner table and lurk in corridors.
- The 1952 Robert Heinlein novel The Rolling Stones concerns a family who buy a used spacecraft and travel the Solar System, financed partly by trading goods to asteroid miners. The novel was derived from a shorter story titled Tramp Space Ship.
- In the Star Wars series, the oft-appearing Millennium Falcon is a tramp starship, as it is a freighter with no fixed route.
- In Raiders of the Lost Ark (1981), Nazis intercept the Ark of the Covenant as it is being transported from Cairo to London aboard a tramp steamer Bantu Wind.
- In Lurulu, a 2004 sci-fi adventure, a crew of pilgrims and adventure seekers voyage to exotic planets on a tramp space freighter.
- In King Kong (2005 film), the 2005 remake of the 1933 original film, the SS Venture is a tramp steamer that ships exotic animals around the world until the ship and its crew were hired by Carl Denham and his production team. He lied to Captain Englehorn and his crew that they were going to Singapore. But after consideration from Captain Englehorn, the ship is steaming to the uncharted Skull Island to film and capture King Kong.
