= Yip (nickname) =

Yip is a nickname of:

- Harry Yip Foster (1907–1978), Canadian National Hockey League player
- Edgar Yipsel Yip Harburg (1896–1981), American song lyricist
- Frank Owen (baseball) (1879–1942), American Major League Baseball pitcher
- Frank Yip Owens (1886–1958), Canadian Major League Baseball catcher
- Harry Yip Radley (1908–1963), Canadian National Hockey League player
