= Galactic Effectuator =

1980 anthology by Jack Vance

Cover of the first edition, published by Underwood-Miller.

Galactic Effectuator is a 1980 science fiction/mystery anthology by American writer Jack Vance, containing the novella The Dogtown Tourist Agency and the novelette "Freitzke's Turn". Both stories are about an intergalactic sleuth, Miro Hetzel, who uses his wits to pursue challenging cases.

== Plot summary ==
The sleuth Miro Hetzel, who calls himself a "galactic effectuator", resolves two mysteries in this combined short novel and short story. In The Dogtown Tourist Agency, he investigates a plan to deliver weapons to the fairly primitive "Gomaz" race on a distant planet called Maz. The story starts with Hetzel tracking a playboy, and then moves onto him taking a case for Palladian Micronics, a robot firm. Hetzel meets with Palladian's CEO, who cannot understand how a competitor is selling a similar robot at a much cheaper price. While the CEO does not know how the competitor is beating his price, the clues point to the primitive planet of Maz. To find the answer to the mystery, Hetzel must penetrate deeper into the primitive zones of the planet, where encounters with the aggressive Gomaz race add to his peril.

In the short story Freitzke's Turn, Hetzel takes on a case for Conwit Clent, who has had his testicles stolen by a rogue doctor. To track down the doctor, Hetzel has to go to his old university, where he studied as a young man. There he encounters a former rival, the brilliant Faurence Dacre, who may be the key to resolving the mystery.

== Reception ==
Kirkus Reviews generally praises the "...pleasures of the Vance intelligence and the Vance prose style", but calls this volume a "...trifle exiguous", as "...there is a lot that might profitably have been left in here in the way of plot", as "...neither mystery is worth the elegance expended on it". In all the review states that the volume has "[m]uch charm, little body."

Speculiction calls Galactic Effectuator "...just average Vance", that, while "[g]enerally comparable to the simplicity of his earlier short fiction", but "[l]acking the sparkling dialogue of the Cugel works or Araminta Station". Speculiction's review of The Dogtown Tourist Agency states that the "...climax of the story shows an imaginative twinkle lacking in much of the author's earlier short fiction, but not quite up to par with his more polished efforts." Speculiction calls "Frietzke's Turn" "...[n]ot up to the same quality as The Dogtown Tourist Agency", and says that perhaps the short story was "...a loose sketch of what would become The Book of Dreams seven years later."
