= The Dark Ocean =

1985 novel by Jack Vance

- Author: Jack Vance
- Language: English
- Publisher: Underwood-Miller
- Publication date: 1985

The Dark Ocean is a mystery novel by American author Jack Vance, published in 1985 by Underwood-Miller and in 2002 as part of the Vance Integral Edition.

== Plot summary ==
Betty Haverhill, an attractive California girl, begins a coming-of-age sojourn, embarking from San Francisco on an Italian freighter bound for ports in El Salvador, Panama, Venezuela, Spain and Italy. Seeking a sense of change and freedom, she is dismayed to find that Ted Bunpole, a former suitor of hers, has been enlisted by her mother to follow her on her trip. Not content with dogging her steps, he further infuriates her by introducing himself as her "fiancé", a notion of which she immediately disabuses both him and her fellow passengers.

Betty develops an attraction for and engages in a mild flirtation with Mik Finsch, an older, mysterious man-of-the-world, but when she accepts an offer of drinks in his cabin, he soon makes it clear he will not take no for an answer when he asks for more. As Betty struggles to fend him off, Ted bursts into Finsch's cabin and the two start fighting; by the time the captain ends the fight, the agile Ted has thrashed the larger Finsch, who claims he was "just warming up".

Though she experiences a moment of warmth for Ted due to his heroic actions, he soon manages to quell those feelings by immediately acting like his boorish self again, and demanding that she accept his proposal. Betty tells him bluntly that she still has no interest in marrying him and wishes he would simply leave her alone. Another passenger tells Betty that Finsch's pride has been wounded and he will get revenge on Ted somehow. That night, Ted goes missing and a typewritten suicide note is found. There are suspicions, but not any proof.

When there is another death involving someone connected to Finsch soon after, it leaves no doubt in Betty's mind that Finsch is a murderer. The two become enemies, and Betty has every reason to fear she might become the next victim.
