= The Brains of Earth =

Short story by Jack Vance

The cover art for The Brains of Earth depicts the parasites which take over people's brains.

The Brains of Earth (later called Nopalgarth) is a science fiction story by Jack Vance published in 1966 by Ace Books. It centers on an invisible parasite called the "nopal" which controls intelligent beings without the hosts being aware of it. This is among many Cold War-era stories that used tales of alien takeovers of people's bodies as an allegory for the paranoia about Communist mind control of the West.

== Plot ==
On the planet Ixax, the Tauptu (who have freed themselves of nopals, a type of brain parasite) have defeated the Chitumih (who are the same species as the Tauptu, but with nopals) in a destructive civil war lasting over a century. Each Tauptu is reinfested by a nopal after about a month and has to undergo a very painful operation to remove the creature. They decide to take the fight to the home planet of the nopals, a world they call Nopalgarth.

The Tauptu kidnap a physicist/mathematician from Earth named Paul Burke and bring him to Ixax. Burke's own nopal makes him view the Tauptu as evil, but after it is killed (by the same monthly procedure the Tauptu undergo), the irrational hatred goes away. They explain the situation and give Burke a choice: eliminate the nopals on Nopalgarth (Earth) or they will destroy Earth. They return Burke to Earth with 100 kilograms of gold and plans for the "denopalizer", the device they use to dislodge the parasite by inflicting terrible pain on the host.

Burke recruits Dr. Ralph Tarlbert, his friend and colleague, though with great difficulty, as every other human being is hostile to him. Despite his attempts to keep his girlfriend Margaret out of it, she becomes involved too. Burke and Tarlbert speculate that the nopal exist in another plane of existence they call the "para-cosmos", though they have "analogues" in this universe, since the nopal can be crushed to death and their barely detectable hides used to ward off other nopal. They try to come up with a better way to rid Earth of the nopal than outright civil war.

Humans are better able to perceive the nopal than the Tauptu, and Burke discovers that when a Tauptu's nopal is destroyed, it is replaced by another brain parasite, which he calls the gher (from the sound it makes). Where there are hordes of nopals, there is only one gher, but with billions of tentacles. It takes the nopals about a month to cut the tentacle attached to a Tauptu's head. After he convinces the Tauptu of the gher's existence, they travel to the world where the analogue of the gher lives. They barely manage to kill the gher. The Tauptu want to exterminate the nopals next, but Burke persuades them to do more research, conning them into believing they actually need the nopals, or at least their hides, as protection from yet more fearsome creatures of the para-cosmos, thus saving humanity. However, Burke thinks he is actually telling the truth, that there are actually other dangerous creatures.
