= Alastor trilogy =

Book series by Jack Vance

The Alastor Trilogy consists of three novels by American writer Jack Vance: Trullion: Alastor 2262 (1973), Marune: Alastor 933 (1975), and Wyst: Alastor 1716 (1978). Vance planned a fourth novel Pharism: Alastor 458, but it was never written. A fourth authorised novel by Tais Teng, Phaedra: Alastor 824, was published under the "Paladins of Vance" label by Spatterlight Press in 2019. The series takes place in the Alastor Cluster as part of Vance's larger Gaean Reach fictional universe.

As described in the novel Marune, three thousand of the star systems in the cluster are inhabited by five trillion humans. Vance describes them as having "little in common except their lack of uniformity." They are ruled by the laissez-faire Connatic Oman Ursht, "the sixteenth of the Idite dynasty". The Connatic's palace, Lusz, on the planet Numenes, rises "ten thousand feet above the sea on five great pylons", and contains chambers dedicated to each inhabited planet.
