= Wyst: Alastor 1716 =

1978 novel by Jack Vance

- First edition cover
- Author: Jack Vance
- Cover artist: Eric Ladd
- Language: English
- Series: Alastor
- Genre: Science fiction
- Published: 1978 (DAW SF Books)
- Publication place: United States
- Media type: Print (Hardback), mass-market paperback
- Pages: 222 pp
- ISBN: 0-87997-593-8
- Preceded by: Marune: Alastor 933

Wyst: Alastor 1716 (1978) is a science fiction novel by Jack Vance first published by DAW Books. It is the third and last novel set in the Alastor Cluster, a group of thousands of stars and planets ruled by the mysterious Connatic, which is a part of Vance's Gaean Reach.

== Setting ==
Arrabus on the planet Wyst is an "egalistic" nation, where everyone is supposedly equal to everyone else. Arrabins work only two hours per week ("drudge"), assigned at random each week. In return, they receive a ration of synthetic food, and are housed in gigantic block tenements. Natural food ("bonter") is very rare, resulting in a flourishing black market trade with the "Weirdlands", the lands beyond Arrabus. An executive committee of four, selected at random and known as the Whispers, governs Arrabus.

== Plot summary ==
Jantiff Ravensroke, a restless young artist from the planet Zeck, wins an art contest and receives a round-trip voucher and three hundred ozols to any planet of his choosing. Jantiff decides on Wyst, having read of its "glorious light, where every surface quivers with its true and just color."

=== Uncibal ===
He arrives in the city of Uncibal in Arrabus and is assigned a room, shared with Skorlet, a middle-aged woman. He is introduced to her lover Esteban and their young daughter Tanzel, as well as the peculiarities of the Arrabin mindset. It is not long before Jantiff learns of the darker side of Arrabin mores. Many of his belongings are stolen the first day, making him more equal to the other residents.

Soon after meeting the beautiful Kedidah, Jantiff is invited on a forage, an expedition into the Weirdlands to steal real food. However, the resident farmers have traps and guard dogs, and Jantiff returns to the city empty-handed.

Later, Esteban announces that he is arranging a bonterfest catered by Weirdland gypsies. Jantiff, Skorlet, Kedidah and Tanzel make tentative plans to attend. Skorlet gets Jantiff to pay for Tanzel by arranging for Kedidah's current roommate, an old man named Sarp, to switch rooms with Jantiff.

By chance, Jantiff overhears a conversation between Skorlet, Esteban, Sarp and an unknown individual about a mysterious plan; it is evident that this plan hinges somehow on Jantiff's drawings. Jantiff reports the suspicious conversation to the Cursar, the Connatic's representative on Wyst. The Cursar, without tangible proof, can only enjoin Jantiff to do all he can to uncover the plot.

Kedidah has become the sheirl for a hussade sports team. The team wins its first game, but when it loses, Kedidah is publicly defiled by Claubus, a twelve-foot wooden effigy. She commits suicide.

=== The Bonterfest ===
Jantiff attends the bonterfest. As requested by Skorlet, he brings his camera, although he replaces the matrix (recording element). The participants are flown to the Weirdlands by Booch, an aide to the Contractor Shubart. Oddly, when Esteban discovers that Jantiff has replaced the matrix, he becomes agitated. Later, Jantiff notices Esteban talking to the gypsies.

The meal is enjoyed by all, but after the gypsies depart, Tanzel goes missing. It is implied that the gypsies have kidnapped her to become an ingredient in their next bonterfest. Jantiff overhears Esteban lamenting the misunderstanding with the gypsies; he was the intended victim.

Jantiff returns to Uncibal to retrieve the matrix, which he now realizes must contain an image of the mysterious fourth member of the cabal. After being intercepted and pursued by Esteban, Jantiff leaves the matrix for the Cursar with the clerk. Several days later, he returns to the Cursar's office and learns that the clerk has been murdered and the matrix is missing. At the current clerk's urging, Jantiff tries to reach the spaceport at Balad to try to return to Zeck.

=== Balad ===
Jantiff stows away on a transporter, but is discovered. The conductor agrees to take him part of the way, though he learns that Balad spaceport accepts no passengers. Jantiff makes his way to Balad on foot, encountering strange witches along the way.

Lacking funds, Jantiff finds work at the Old Groar Inn. He meets Eubanq, Balad's port agent and an employee of Contractor Shubart. For 100 ozols, Eubanq offers to arrange a flight from Balad to Uncibal and its spaceport. Booch, the pilot who flew the bonterfesters to the Weirdlands, also lives at Balad. Jantiff works diligently to earn the money. He rescues a mute young witch woman, who he later names Glisten, from Booch and nurses her back to health.

Some weeks later, Eubanq notices that Jantiff's hands have the "yellows", a medical condition believed to be caused by eating witches' food. Jantiff returns to his hut and discovers that his savings have been stolen and Glisten is missing. Jantiff confronts Eubanq, but the townspeople decide to punish Jantiff for exposing them to the yellows. Fleeing into Contractor Shubart's mansion, he discovers Skorlet, Esteban, and Sarp. The townspeople smash his "yellowed" fingers and blind him. Afterward, Booch comes looking for Jantiff's money and to kill him; he is interrupted by Ryl Schermatz, a high-ranking official sent by the Connatic. Booch tries to kill Schermatz, but is himself slain.

Jantiff tells Schermatz what he has deduced: Esteban noticed a physical similarity between himself, Skorlet, Sarp, and Contractor Shubart, and the current Whispers. The cabal disposed of the real Whispers and took their places, even journeying through space to meet with the Connatic.

Schermatz returns to Balad with Jantiff, whose vision is somewhat restored, and arrests Eubanq. He reveals that a harmless, easily cured fungus causes the yellows, and that the persecution of the witches is to end. Then, he and Jantiff return to Uncibal.

=== Conclusion ===
They learn that the false Whispers plan a Grand Rally to celebrate the anniversary of the founding of Arrabus. Jantiff realizes just barely in time that it is a scheme to eliminate everyone who knows the plotters. It comes too late to save the guests, who are blown up, but Schermatz and Jantiff survive. Schermatz has the four impostors arrested and sentenced to death.

The original Whispers had recognized that Arrabus was falling apart economically and had intended to appeal to the Connatic for help. The fake Whispers had taken an entirely different tone with the Connatic, raising his suspicions and causing Schermatz (who may actually be the Connatic in disguise) to investigate. He intimates to Jantiff that the Arrabin society will have to change drastically.

Jantiff returns to Zeck, where some months later, a cured, speaking Glisten arrives at his door.
