= Marune: Alastor 933 =

1975 novel by Jack Vance

- First edition
- Author: Jack Vance
- Cover artist: Darrell Sweet
- Language: English
- Series: Gaean Reach
- Genre: Science fiction
- Publisher: Ballantine Books
- Publication date: 1975
- Publication place: United States
- Pages: 169
- OCLC: 1502552
- Preceded by: Trullion: Alastor 2262
- Followed by: Wyst: Alastor 1716

Marune: Alastor 933 (1975) is a science fiction novel by American writer Jack Vance, the second of three books set in the Alastor Cluster. Three thousand of the star systems are inhabited by five trillion humans, ruled by the mostly hands-off, laissez-faire Connatic, who occasionally, in the manner of Harun al-Rashid of The Thousand and One Nights, goes among his people in disguise. The novel was preceded by Trullion: Alastor 2262 (1973) and followed by Wyst: Alastor 1716 (1978).

Marune: Alastor 933 first appeared in serialized format in the July and September 1975 issues of Amazing Science Fiction magazine. It was issued in paperback book format in September 1975 by Ballantine Books.

== Plot ==
A young man (provisionally called Pardero) has lost his memory—remembering nothing of his past. Acting on good advice, he earns enough money by menial labor to travel to the Connatic's free hospital on the capital planet Numenes. There, after much research, medical technicians are able to deduce from his reactions to various stimuli that he is a Rhune from the sparsely populated planet Marune—a planet illuminated by four stars (Suns). The Rhunes are a somewhat peculiar people who, among other traits, have a strong aversion to killing (unless it be in combat). From this and other clues, the man becomes convinced some enemy has caused his amnesia.

He journeys home just in time to be acknowledged the ruler (Kaiark) of a small realm, following the suspicious death of his father in battle. He has to tread carefully, unsure of whom he can trust, in his quest to unmask his foe. He has to deal with the now-unfamiliar customs of his people, which are based on the illumination provided by the four suns; in particular during Mirk, when all the suns set in the sky and night falls, Rhune men and women are free to commit, without condemnation or punishment, what at other times would be crimes or shocking behavior.
