= The Houses of Iszm =

Novel by Jack Vance

- Cover of 1964 Ace Double edition
- Author: Jack Vance
- Language: English
- Genre: Science fiction
- Publisher: Ace Books
- Publication date: 1964
- Publication place: United States
- Media type: Print (Paperback)
- Pages: 121

The Houses of Iszm is a science fiction novella by American writer Jack Vance, which appeared in Startling Stories magazine in 1954. It was reissued in book form in 1964 as part of an Ace Double novel, together with Vance's Son of the Tree. The story published in Startling Stories is about 22,000 words while the version that appears in the Ace Double still less than novel length at about 30,000 words. The Houses of Iszm was re-published as a stand-alone volume in 1974 by Mayflower.

== Plot summary ==
The inhabitants of a planet called Iszm, a species known as the Iszic, have evolved the native giant trees into living homes, with all needs and various luxuries supplied by the trees' own natural growth. The Iszic maintain a jealously guarded monopoly, exporting only enough trees to keep prices high and make a great profit. Ailie Farr is a human botanist who goes to Iszm. Unlike many others of many species, he is not there to try to steal a female tree, which might allow the propagation of the species off world and break the monopoly. Seemingly by chance, he is witness to one such spectacular and very nearly successful attempt. He is temporarily imprisoned with the sole survivor of the raid as a prime suspect in the eyes of the Iszic security force. His drugged interrogation reveals his innocence, and the Iszic reluctantly allow him to return to Earth. There, his unwitting participation in the raid is revealed.

== Major themes ==
The Houses of Iszm exhibits some of the stylistic elements that would come to characterize many of Vance's later works: a picaresque protagonist who unintentionally achieves the greater good in spite of himself, highly exotic locales populated by equally exotic sentient species, and the theme that more advanced sentient species are withholding vital technology or information in order to keep humanity in a subservient status.

== Sources ==
- Underwood, Tim; Chuck Miller (1980). Jack Vance. New York: Taplinger Publishing Company. p. 228. ISBN 0-8008-4295-2.
