= Maske: Thaery =

1976 novel by Jack Vance

- First edition
- Author: Jack Vance
- Cover artist: Richard Powers
- Language: English
- Series: Gaean Reach
- Genre: Science fiction
- Publisher: Putnam Publishing
- Publication date: 1976
- Publication place: United States
- Media type: Print (Hardback), mass-market paperback

Maske: Thaery is a science fiction novel by American writer Jack Vance, set in his Gaean Reach universe, which was first published in hardcover by Putnam, in 1976. It is about a young man's planet-hopping pursuit of the arrogant nobleman who almost killed him.

Maske: Thaery continues Vance's interest in richly textured, strongly xenological settings, in which an outsider protagonist comes into conflict with a bewilderingly complex social hierarchy, other examples being Emphyrio (1969) and the Durdane trilogy. Like many of Vance's novels of the 1960s and '70s, the narrative of Maske: Thaery might be described as a bildungsroman.

== Plot summary ==
On the planet Maske, Jubal Droad goes on "Yallow," a rite of passage into adulthood, traditionally spent doing public works. As part of his Yallow, Droad spends several weeks repairing a trail. One day, the arrogant noble Rampus Ymph ignores Jubal's warning to not use the still unfinished trail, causing it to collapse and seriously injure Droad.

When Jubal recovers, he arrives in the city of Wysrod for the examination of Ramus Ymph for the high office of Servant. Jubal recognizes his nemesis. He informs Nai the Hever, the senior Servant, of Ramus's illegal activities. This results in Ramus being rejected.

Nai the Hever offers Jubal a seemingly lowly position as Sanitary Inspector in unit D3. Jubal reluctantly accepts and learns that D3 is actually the intelligence service. He is now a secret agent in training. Jubal's first assignment is to discover what Ramus is plotting. He follows Ramus to the tourist world Eiselbar and learns that he is trying to raise money to purchase a space yacht.

Back on Maske, Cadmus off-Droad, Jubal's illegitimate brother, murders Trewe, head of the clan, asserting that he had been robbed of his rightful place. The clan gathers and brings Cadmus down. However, Cadmus's masked chief accomplice escapes and Jubal is certain that it is Ramus.

Ramus sails across the ocean to meet with the Waels, a people known for their spiritual connection to trees. Jubal takes Ramus' fiance, Mieltrude, into custody and sets off in pursuit. During the voyage, Mieltrude informs Jubal that her engagement to Ramus was a subterfuge to aid her father's investigation of Ramus.

Jubal finds Ramus negotiating with the Waels for the use of part of their land for much-needed food and other resources. Jubal, disguised as a Wael, gets him to admit that he plans to construct tourist resorts on the land. The Waels reject his proposal. They insist that Shrack and Jubal take him away. When they reach Wysrod, Ramus transforms into a tree.

== Characters ==
- Jubal Droad, a young Glint man
- Trewe Droad, Jubal's older brother and head of the Droad clan
- Vaidro Droad, Jubal's uncle, a retired intelligence agent from D3
- Ramus Ymph, an arrogant and ambitious Thariot nobleman
- Nai the Hever, a wealthy, middle-aged Thariot of high status
- Eyvant Dasduke, Nai the Hever's chief subordinate in the D3 intelligence agency
- Mieltrude, Nai the Hever's daughter
- Sune Mircea, Mieltrude's friend
- Shrack, a ship captain
- the Minie, the leader of the Waels
- Cadmus off-Droad, illegitimate brother of Jubal and Trewe

== Reception ==
Kirkus Reviews had a somewhat negative opinion of the novel, stating, "Vance is an adroit tale-spinner with a gift for inventing places, situations, and amusing background impedimenta. But the plot mechanics of this story smack of haste and thumbtacks."

On the other hand, Black Gate reviewer John O'Neill considered it "one of the more unique works in Jack Vance’s oeuvre. Part bildungsroman, part cautionary, and all story, the master of imaginative science fiction and fantasy weaves yet another highly readable tale of intergalactic culture and adventure."
