= Demon Princes =

Science-fiction pentalogy by Jack Vance

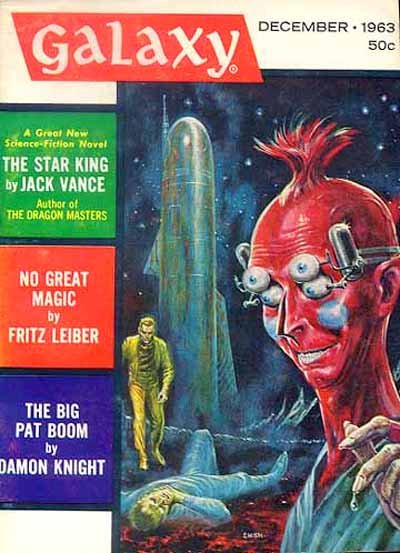
The first Demon Princes novel, The Star King, was serialized in Galaxy Science Fiction; cover illustration by Ed Emshwiller

Demon Princes is a series of five science fiction novels by Jack Vance, which cumulatively relate the story of Kirth Gersen, a man trained by his grandfather to exact revenge on five notorious interstellar crime bosses, collectively known as the Demon Princes, who attacked his village, killing some and carrying the survivors off into slavery when he was a child. Each novel deals with his pursuit of one of the five Princes.

== Novels ==
- Star King (1964). The first target of Gersen's revenge is Attel Malagate, a renegade from a species called the Star Kings. The Star Kings can consciously direct their own evolution quickly and are driven to imitate and surpass the most successful species they encounter. Upon contacting humanity, they begin making themselves into imitations of human beings, the best being able to pass as human. Gersen lures Malagate within reach with an undeveloped and fantastically beautiful planet whose location is known only to Gersen. Malagate covets the planet as the home of a new race—to be fathered by it—that can outdo both humans and his own species.
- The Killing Machine (1964). Gersen discovers that Kokor Hekkus has prolonged his life by the vivisection of human beings to obtain hormones and other substances from their living bodies. Not content with living just one life, Kokor Hekkus uses the lost planet Thamber as a stage where he can act out his fantasies under a variety of identities.
- The Palace of Love (1967). Viole Falushe is so obsessed with a girl from his youth that he created a number of clones of her in a vain attempt to psychologically manipulate one into returning his love. Gersen, disguised as a journalist, travels to a planet where the Demon Prince has built an entire civilization acknowledging him as its supreme ruler.
- The Face (1979). Gersen pursues Lens Larque, a sadist and monumental trickster, to various planets. He uncovers Larque's most grandiose jest, revenge for a slight.
- The Book of Dreams (1981). Gersen foils several schemes by Howard Alan Treesong, already the head of the underworld across the human regions of the galaxy, to take over the most powerful of humanity's organizations.

== Publication history ==
The first three books in the series appeared in 1964-67 and were published in both hard cover and mass-market paperback editions under the Berkley Medallion imprint. There was a 12-year gap before the last two appeared as paperbacks in 1979 and 1981. They were also published in limited hardback editions of 700 copies each by Underwood-Miller in 1981. The collected books were published as a limited edition set, The Demon Princes, in 1997. The Demon Princes books were republished by Spatterlight Press in 2016 as paperback volumes using the author-preferred text from the Vance Integral Edition.

== Reception ==
Dave Langford reviewed Star King for White Dwarf #99, and stated that "The revenge plot is banal in the extreme, but the pace is headlong and it's impossible not to admire the backdrop." Arthur Jean Cox reviewed Star King in the August 1964 issue of Riverside Quarterly.

Greg Costikyan reviewed The Face in Ares Magazine #1. Costikyan commented that "All in all, The Face is an intriguing and well-plotted adventure in Vance's usual strange style. It is also considerably more expert and cleanly written than most of Vance's other work; apparently, Vance is still refining his style and sharpening his abilities. The Face is well worth reading, especially if you can get hold of the previous three novels in the 'Demon Princes' series."
