= Star King =

1964 science fiction novel by Jack Vance

- cover of The Star King
- Author: Jack Vance
- Cover artist: Richard M. Powers
- Language: English
- Series: Demon Princes
- Genre: Science fiction
- Publisher: Berkley Books
- Publication date: 1964
- Publication place: United States
- Media type: Print (Paperback)
- Followed by: The Killing Machine

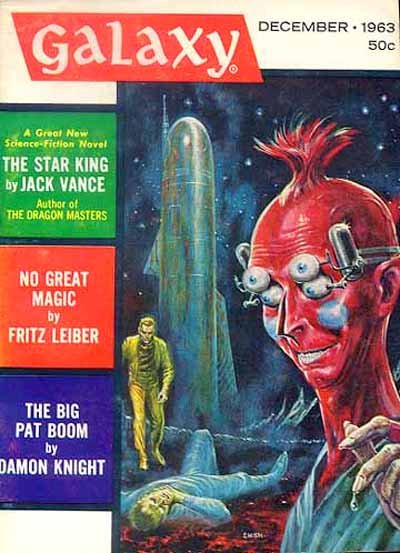
The Star King was serialized in Galaxy Science Fiction. with a cover illustration by Ed Emshwiller

Star King (also published as The Star King) is a science fiction novel by American writer Jack Vance, the first in his Demon Princes series. It tells the story of a young man, Kirth Gersen, who sets out to track down and avenge himself upon the Demon Princes, five arch-criminals who massacred or enslaved nearly all the inhabitants of his colony world when he was a child.

Star King was originally serialized in the December 1963 and February 1964 editions of Galaxy magazine, as The Star King. The antagonist of the book was originally known as Grendel the Monster and was subsequently renamed Attel Malagate for the novel version. The magazine version featured a striking cover and interior illustrations by Ed Emshwiller.

== Plot summary ==
Gersen is taking a short holiday at Smade's Tavern, the only settlement on Smade's Planet, which is a "neutral ground" hostelry for crook and honest person alike in the lawless Beyond. Here he meets an explorer with a problem: Lugo Teehalt has discovered a beautiful and unspoiled world – but he has learned that his employer is the notorious criminal Attel Malagate, "Malagate the Woe", and Teehalt cannot bear to see his planet despoiled by him. Malagate is the most secretive of the Star Kings Gersen seeks, hiding his true identity. Some of Malagate's minions murder Teehalt and steal the spaceship parked nearby. By chance, Gersen's spaceship is the same common model as Teehalt's; the thieves have taken the wrong ship. Gersen departs in the deceased man's ship and thus comes into possession of the navigational monitor that contains the planet's coordinates.

Gersen goes in search of the identity of Teehalt's employer. He quickly establishes that his mission was sponsored by someone at Sea Province University, an important institution on the planet Alphanor in the Rigel Concourse, and narrows Malagate's alter ego to one of three men, all senior officials at the university. All deny specific knowledge of Teehalt. By now, Gersen has encountered two of Malagate's chief henchmen, whom he saw earlier at Smade's Tavern: Tristano the Earthman, and Sivij Suthiro the Sarkoy. He knows that Malagate is aware of what he carries, though not his motivation.

He has also deduced that Malagate is not human, but rather a "Star King", a member of a species that can rapidly evolve in a few generations to resemble (and strive to outcompete) what they view as the most successful race. After contacting humanity, the Star Kings began changing their appearance to look more and more like humans. The most successful can readily pass for human.

During his visit to the university, Gersen makes the acquaintance of Pallis Atwrode, a clerical assistant. While the two are enjoying an evening out, they are attacked by another of Malagate's lieutenants, the hideous Hildemar Dasce. Gersen is left unconscious and Pallis abducted. Through a combination of detective work and good luck, he traces her to a secret base belonging to Dasce. He takes the three officials to see Teehalt's world, which they are interested in purchasing. Along the way, Gersen rescues Pallis and captures Dasce, along with a prisoner Dasce has tortured for years, Robin Rampold.

Gersen convinces Dasce that Malagate betrayed him and then allows Dasce to overpower him. Dasce's attempt to avenge himself on Malagate reveals the Star King's identity. In combination with strong circumstantial evidence, this convinces the other two men to accept Gersen's accusations. After Dasce's unsuccessful attack and flight, Gersen tells Malagate that he is to be summarily executed. Malagate escapes underground, only to be killed a few minutes later by one of the native lifeforms. At his own request, Rampold is left behind. He subsequently turns the tables on his former torturer and begins a long-term program of revenge.

== Reception ==
Dave Langford reviewed Star King for White Dwarf #99, and stated that "The revenge plot is banal in the extreme, but the pace is headlong and it's impossible not to admire the backdrop."

== Reviews ==
- Arthur Jean Cox (1964) in Riverside Quarterly, August 1964
- Robert Silverberg (1964) in Amazing Stories, September 1964
- P. Schuyler Miller (1965) in Analog Science Fiction - Science Fact, September 1965
- Chris Morgan (1978) in Vector 89
- David A. Truesdale (1979) in Science Fiction Review, May 1979
- Brian Magorrian (1988) in Paperback Inferno, #71
