= The Book of Dreams (Vance novel) =

Novel by Jack Vance

- First edition
- Author: Jack Vance
- Cover artist: Ken W. Kelly
- Language: English
- Series: Demon Princes
- Genre: Science fiction
- Publisher: DAW Books
- Publication date: 1981
- Publication place: United States
- Media type: Print (Paperback)
- Pages: 235
- ISBN: 0-87997-587-3
- OCLC: 7054607
- LC Class: CPB Box no. 2504 vol. 17
- Preceded by: The Face

The Book of Dreams is a 1981 science fiction book by American author Jack Vance, the fifth and last novel in the Demon Princes series.

== Plot summary ==
Kirth Gersen learns that his enemy Howard Alan Treesong, already "Lord of the Overmen" (i.e., head of the underworld across all of humanity's planets), nearly arranged to be appointed Chief of the Interworld Police Coordinating Commission, the sole interstellar police organization. Gersen ponders what Treesong could be working on that could top that.

Gersen's extensive business empire includes Cosmopolis magazine, and he often masquerades as a journalist, "Henry Lucas". Gersen examines old Cosmopolis files for anything about Treesong. He discovers a photograph, apparently of a formal dinner, bearing the words "H A Treesong is here", with no other information. He launches Extant, a livelier sister magazine to Cosmopolis, and publishes the picture in the free inaugural issue, offering large cash prizes for the identification of anyone in the photograph.

An attractive young woman, Alice Wroke, seeks temporary employment processing contest entries. Gersen confirms she is working for Treesong. Eventually, all of the subjects are identified, except for one man who goes by a variety of names. Gersen tells Alice that the contest was intended to identify Treesong, and that the magazine wants to interview him.

Gersen suspects the photograph depicts most of the highest-ranking Fellows of the powerful Institute, seven members of the governing "Dexad" and three Fellows of rank 99. All but one were fatally poisoned at the banquet. The survivor must be Treesong. Having fraudulently acquired the rank of 99, he plans to become the Institute's leader, the Triune. Three of the Dexad were not present. One had died; the banquet was to choose his successor from the 99s. Another had broken with the Institute and become a hermit. The last was Alice's father; Treesong blackmailed Alice into spying for him by threatening to kill her father (whom he had already murdered).

Gersen saves the hermit from assassination, in the process shooting Treesong in the leg. The hermit, as the new Triune, cancels Treesong's spurious rank, foiling another plan to acquire a position of immense power.

Treesong's father enters the contest, identifying him as Howard Hardoah. His letter mentions a school reunion, to which Howard has been invited. Treesong himself calls Extant, but is too late to claim a prize. "Lucas" offers to publish his memoirs, but he says he has an urgent rendezvous on a distant planet. Gersen suspects that he will attend the reunion.

Gersen visits and interviews the elder Hardoah. He also meets Howard's older brother Ledesmus, who hid Howard's prized "Book of Dreams," an exercise book in which he wrote his childhood fantasies. Howard assaulted his only childhood friend, Nymphotis Cleadhoe, when he thought Nymphotis had taken it. Ledesmus sells the book to Gersen.

At the reunion, Treesong, assisted by his underlings, imposes imaginative (though non-lethal) humiliations on his childhood tormenters. Gersen, disguised as a musician, shoots and wounds Treesong before fleeing.

Gersen believes the Book could lure Treesong out of hiding. Nymphotis's parents, Otho and Tuty, know Treesong killed their only child and are willing to help. Gersen has Cosmopolis publish a sensationalized report of Treesong's exploits at the reunion and a letter purportedly from Tuty, in which she calls Howard their son's friend and casually mentions an exercise book she still has. Treesong takes the bait.

The Cleadhoes lure Treesong to their isolated jungle outpost on another world, but leave Gersen (and Alice, now his lover) behind. Gersen and Alice follow. They find that Otho has disposed of Treesong's henchmen, knocked him out and marmelized (converted to a stony substance) his legs. Immobilized, Treesong is seated in an indoor garden facing the marmelized statue of Nymphotis. He mourns his narrow failure to make himself the first Emperor of the Gaean Worlds and asks to be left alone. He then manages to topple himself over face down so that he drowns in a fountain.

As Treesong was the last of five great criminals whom Gersen had set out to kill, Gersen tells Alice that he does not know what he will do now.
