= Emphyrio =

1969 novel by Jack Vance

- Dust-jacket illustration from the book edition (hardback)
- Author: Jack Vance
- Cover artist: Paul Covington
- Language: English
- Genre: Science fiction
- Publisher: Doubleday
- Publication date: 1969
- Publication place: United States
- Media type: Print (Hardback)
- Pages: 261

Emphyrio is a science fiction adventure novel by American writer Jack Vance. It tells the story of a young man who overturns the foundations of his world.

== Plot summary ==
First publication in June 1969 edition of Fantastic Science Fiction Cover art by Johnny Bruck

Ghyl Tarvoke grows up on the planet Halma with his father Amiante. Their people are ruled by two hundred lords whose forefathers arrived 1500 years earlier and rebuilt a world devastated by many wars. In return, they were granted a 1% tax. Later, all mass manufacturing was outlawed and the people became artisans, selling their handmade work to a single company controlled by the lords. Amiante is a master woodcarver, and his son follows in his trade.

When he is eight, Ghyl attends a puppet show; part of the entertainment is the traditional drama of Emphyrio, a legendary hero. The proprietor points out a young girl in the audience and informs the boy that she is the daughter of a lord. Some time later, he and a friend sneak aboard a space yacht out of curiosity and are caught by the same girl. She has them beaten and thrown out.

As time passes, Ghyl comes to realize that his father is dissatisfied with the constraints of their society. Twice, Amiante is caught by the authorities illegally duplicating ancient documents; the second time, he is taken away for four days. His personality is greatly changed, and soon after his release, he dies.

A few years later, Ghyl goes to a ball and encounters the girl, now an appealingly attractive woman, for the third time and finally learns her name, Shanne. That night, they become lovers. But she tells him that she is leaving soon to travel to the stars.

An acquaintance, the dynamic but unscrupulous Nion, persuades Ghyl and three others to hijack a space yacht and hold the passengers for ransom. The scheme is only made possible because Ghyl knows the departure date and the particular ship (the same one he sneaked aboard years before) that Shanne is leaving on. However, no ransom is forthcoming. When Ghyl wants to release their captives, there is violent opposition from Nion and Ghyl's childhood friend Floriel, resulting in several deaths. In the end, they reach an uneasy compromise: Ghyl is left on a planet with the lords, while Nion and Floriel take the ship.

Ghyl guides his charges to civilization, but notices their odd behavior along the way. Two of them are killed by local denizens when they ignore his warnings. After they reach a town, he slips away before they have him arrested. By chance, he sees one of his father's works in a shop. He discovers that it is a reproduction and that the priceless original is in a museum. He talks the shop owner into financing a venture to buy artwork on Halma for more than the pittance the lords pay.

However, for some reason, no one is willing to sell to him. Then, though disguised, he is recognized and sentenced to death for his earlier crimes. Escaping a horrible execution undetected, he steals the best works from a warehouse, takes his cargo to Earth, and sells it for a fortune.

While there, he visits the Historical Institute and learns the true history of his homeworld. The alien Damarans were forced to abandon Halma by spacefaring invaders. They found refuge on its moon and eventually struck back with warriors they had bred, but by then, their enemy had departed and humans had arrived, only to be attacked. Emphyrio attempted to negotiate peace, but was killed by the Damarans. However, the warriors listened to his message and stopped fighting, forcing the Damarans to resort to other means.

Ghyl visits the Damaran moon and finds Emphyrio's place of execution. Seeing the Damarans firsthand, he deduces something of monumental importance. He goes to see the head of the lords on Halma and threatens to broadcast the truth about their relationship with the Damarans. With this leverage, he forces them to leave Halma. Soon afterwards, a human fleet lands on the Damaran moon and extracts payment for centuries of unwitting slavery.

== Reception ==
Joanna Russ found Emphyrio to be "a fine book," saying Vance's "tone is perfectly controlled" and that "one would swear he had read Bert Brecht and decided to produce a novel that would be one extended Verfremdungseffekt".

Richard Horton wrote in his SF Site review:

This is one of Vance's better novels, and in many ways a good introduction to this author. On display are many of the hallmarks of his mature style: his elegant writing, his wonderful depiction of local colour, his unusual social systems. Emphyrio lacks only the humour that is so often present in Vance: this is one of his more melancholy books.
