= The Face (Vance novel) =

1979 novel by Jack Vance

- First English language edition cover
- Author: Jack Vance
- Original title: Lens Larque
- Cover artist: Gino D'Achille
- Language: English
- Series: Demon Princes
- Genre: Science fiction
- Publisher: DAW Books
- Publication date: 1979
- Publication place: United States
- Media type: Print (Paperback)
- Pages: 224
- ISBN: 0-87997-498-2
- OCLC: 5672243
- Preceded by: The Palace of Love
- Followed by: The Book of Dreams

The Face is a science fiction novel by American writer Jack Vance, the fourth novel in the "Demon Princes" series. It was published in 1979, nearly twelve years after the third.

== Plot summary ==
Kirth Gersen pursues the notorious criminal Lens Larque, one of the five so-called Demon Princes, across several worlds, most notably Aloysius, the harsh desert world Dar Sai (home world of the Darsh, of whom Larque is one) and the more temperate and genteel Methel, which has grown rich doing business on Dar Sai. Gersen determines that Larque is connected somehow with a seemingly worthless Dar Sai company called Kotzash Mutual. Gersen, by dint of skill and cleverness, gains control of the company. He also rescues Jerdian Chanseth, a young aristocratic Methlen woman, from a Darsh man, and a brief romance blossoms between them.

Gersen then travels to Methel to investigate Kotzash. He attempts to renew his relationship with Jerdian, going so far as to buy the mansion next to her family's, but is rejected as a suitor by her father, bank owner Adario Chanseth, who uses the law to nullify the sale of the house. It turns out that Larque had himself tried to buy the same estate, but had also been thwarted by the same Methlen law, with Chanseth telling Larque (not knowing who he was at the time) that he had no wish to see his "great Darsh face hanging over my garden fence."

Gersen learns that Kotzash Mutual has done extensive work on Shanitra, the small moon of Methel, for some mysterious reason. It is well known that Shanitra has no useful deposits of ore and is practically worthless. Nonetheless, Kotzash has gone to great pains to place explosives all across its surface.

Gersen finally tracks Larque down on Methel and fatally poisons him. In his final moments, Larque begs Gersen to press a button, but Gersen denies him his last request, at least while he is alive to enjoy his most grandiose scheme. However, after Larque is dead, Gersen considers, then presses it. Explosives are set off which shape Shanitra into the semblance of Larque's face. He then phones Chanseth and informs him, "There's a great Darsh face hanging over the garden wall."

== Reception ==
Greg Costikyan reviewed The Face in Ares Magazine #1. Costikyan commented that "All in all, The Face is an intriguing and well-plotted adventure in Vance's usual strange style. It is also considerably more expert and cleanly written than most of Vance's other work; apparently, Vance is still refining his style and sharpening his abilities. The Face is well worth reading, especially if you can get hold of the previous three novels in the 'Demon Princes' series."

== Reviews ==
- Review by Baird Searles (1980) in Isaac Asimov's Science Fiction Magazine, February 1980
- Review by Thomas A. Easton [as by Tom Easton] (1980) in Analog Science Fiction/Science Fact, July 1980
- Review by W. Paul Ganley (1980) in Eerie Country, 3, 1980
- Review by Simon Ounsley (1981) in Vector 103
- Review by Andy Sawyer (1988) in Paperback Inferno, #74

== Sources ==
- Jaffery, Sheldon (1987). Future and Fantastic Worlds: A Bibliographic Retrospective of DAW Books (1972-1987). Mercer Island, WA: Starmont House, Inc. p. 125. ISBN 1-55742-002-5.
- Underwood, Tim; Chuck Miller (1980). Jack Vance. New York: Taplinger Publishing Company. p. 228. ISBN 0-8008-4295-2.
