= The Killing Machine =

1964 novel by Jack Vance

- First edition cover of The Killing Machine
- Author: Jack Vance
- Cover artist: Richard M. Powers
- Language: English
- Series: Demon Princes
- Genre: Science fiction
- Publisher: Berkley Books
- Publication date: 1964
- Publication place: United States
- Media type: Print (Paperback)
- Preceded by: Star King
- Followed by: The Palace of Love

The Killing Machine (1964) is a science fiction novel by American writer Jack Vance, the second in his "Demon Princes" series.

== Plot summary ==
Kirth Gersen sets his sights on Kokor Hekkus, one of the Demon Princes. To hone his skills, Gersen spends time as a "weasel", a police spy in the lawless Beyond. He is sent to disrupt a meeting between a criminal named Billy Windle and a Mr Hoskins. Gersen learns that Billy Windle is Kokor Hekkus. Hekkus is trying to sell the secret of immortality for instructions on how to create perfect counterfeit money, but Gersen ends up with the latter process.

He then learns that Hekkus is perpetrating a series of kidnappings of extremely wealthy people and discovers why. When a beautiful, young woman named Alusz Iphigenia Eperje-Tokay, who claims to be from the legendary lost planet Thamber, discovered that Hekkus wanted her, she sought refuge at the only place she could think of that could not be pressured into surrendering her to him: Interchange. Interchange facilitates the exchange of kidnap victims for their ransoms, and Hekkus cannot afford to lose its services. She acted as her own "kidnapper" and set the highest ransom Interchange would allow, but Hekkus is steadily amassing the enormous sum.

During his investigation, Gersen ransoms Myron Patch, an engineer who built for Hekkus a walking "fort" in the shape of a dnazd, a many-legged monster native to Thamber. After a dispute over the project, Hekkus took Patch captive. Gersen tries to lure Hekkus within his reach by offering to modify the fort to Hekkus's satisfaction, but is himself kidnapped and sent to Interchange. Fortunately, he deciphers Hoskins' notes on how to counterfeit currency, and thereby manages to forge enough money to free himself.

He returns with enough counterfeit currency to ransom Alusz Iphigenia, hoping she will be able to guide him to Thamber, where Hekkus periodically resides. Since she is entitled, as her own "sponsor", to the bulk of the ransom, Gersen asks for a bank draft drawn on a reputable bank, thereby acquiring genuine laundered money. Gersen has also printed his fake money using ink that will fade away in a couple of weeks, thus robbing Interchange and Hekkus of a vast fortune. Alusz Iphigenia supplies the rest of an incomplete well-known nursery rhyme that enables Gersen to find the planet.

Thamber is home to a quasi-medieval culture. Gersen and Alusz Iphigenia encounter a barbarian tribe. He fights the leader of the warband to save her from sexual slavery, and they accompany the warriors to Kokor Hekkus's castle. There the barbarians easily defeat Hekkus's foot soldiers, but then Patch's machine appears and sends the barbarians fleeing in panic. Gersen disables the machine, using a secret device he had had installed, and takes its crew prisoner, observing that one of them, Franz Paderbush, resembles Billy Windle.

He takes the fort to the castle of Sion Trumble, who was Alusz Iphigenia's fiancé. One of Trumble's associates was tortured by Hekkus, but (uncertainly) denies that he is Paderbush. Gersen has his suspicions, however, and allows his prisoner to escape. He then forces his way into Trumble's private quarters. There he finds Paderbush in the process of transforming himself into Trumble; both are Hekkus disguises. Hekkus has no face and conceals the lack with masks. Gersen identifies himself, reminds Hekkus of the Mount Pleasant raid in which nearly all of Gersen's family was murdered, then kills him. He returns to the Oikumene accompanied by Alusz Iphigenia, promising to send ships to bring Thamber back into contact with the rest of humanity.
