= The Palace of Love =

1967 novel by Jack Vance

- First edition cover of The Palace of Love
- Author: Jack Vance
- Cover artist: Richard M. Powers
- Language: English
- Series: Demon Princes
- Genre: Science fiction
- Publisher: Berkley Books
- Publication date: 1967
- Publication place: United States
- Media type: Print (Paperback)
- Pages: 176
- Preceded by: The Killing Machine
- Followed by: The Face

The Palace of Love (1967) is a science fiction novel by American writer Jack Vance, the third in his Demon Princes series. It is about a wealthy man, Kirth Gersen, who is obsessed with seeking vengeance on the remaining Demon Princes who killed his family many years ago. To get access to the elusive and secretive Viole Falushe, one of the Demon Princes, Gersen poses as a journalist and wrangles a rare invitation to Falushe's hedonistic Palace of Love.

== Plot summary ==
Kirth Gersen's short-lived relationship with Alusz Iphigenia Eperje-Tokay, a woman he had rescued in the previous novel of the series is nearing an end, as she cannot understand why Gersen, made extremely wealthy by his epic defrauding of Interchange, still feels the need to personally exterminate the remaining Demon Princes who killed his family.

Gersen notices a newspaper article announcing the forthcoming execution of a prominent Sarkoy venefice (poison maker), Kakarsis Asm, for selling poisons to the Demon Prince Viole Falushe below a Guild-mandated price floor. He accordingly hastens to Sarkovy, a planet famous for its poisons. In return for arranging a swift and painless execution, he learns that Falushe visited Sarkovy at the beginning of his criminal career with a shipload of slaves. He sold two female slaves to Asm. While on Sarkovy, Gersen's relationship with Alusz Iphigenia finally ends, though he ensures that she will be financially comfortable.

After visiting his new financial advisor, Jehan Addels, to check how Addels' investment of the titanic proceeds of his swindle is proceeding, Gersen locates a surviving slave, whom he buys and frees in exchange for further information. He learns that Falushe was born Vogel Filschner, an Earth boy of disgusting appearance and habits who, to satisfy his obsession with a female classmate, Jheral Tinzy, had kidnapped the entire girls' choral society at his school. But by chance, Jheral had not attended choir practice that day.

Gersen follows the trail to "Rolingshaven" in the Netherlands, to people who knew Filschner as a youth. The mad poet Navarth was Filschner's mentor and later enjoyed a brief relationship with Jheral. After the kidnapping, she had attracted a share of the blame for having teased and flirted with Filschner and turned to Navarth for comfort. However, she was later abducted by Falushe. Navarth has custody of an 18-year-old girl, variously known as Drusilla Wayles and "Zan Zu from Eridu," who was given to him as a child by Falushe to nurture and protect. She resembles the young Jheral to a disturbing extent.

With the erratic assistance of Navarth, Gersen tries to engineer a meeting with Falushe. To this end, he buys the failing, but respected Cosmopolis magazine, disguises himself as a journalist, and authors a lurid article that paints the young Falushe in extremely unflattering terms. He is able, through Navarth, to contact Falushe by telephone and secures an invitation to Falushe's legendary Palace of Love, a hedonistic playground, in return for writing a more flattering article.

On Falushe's planet, Gersen sees that the Demon Prince has built an entire civilization acknowledging him as its supreme ruler. The female inhabitants pay "tax" to him by working in state brothels and by giving their first-born children to him (the most beautiful going to staff the luxurious Palace, the others being sold as slaves). In the company of a party of invitees including Navarth, Gersen visits the Palace. Eventually, he discovers Falushe's lifelong ambition: to create a clone of Jheral Tinzy brainwashed into loving him. Navarth's Drusilla Wayles was bred parthenogenically from the original Jheral, and there are at least two others on the planet. Jheral herself killed herself some years into the forced breeding program.

Gersen, guessing correctly that Viole Falushe is one of his fellow guests so that Falushe can try to win Drusilla's affections. He finally identifies his target with the aid of a critical error by Falushe: he has an implanted in-ear telephone, which can be heard quietly ringing when Navarth calls him. Gersen rescues two Jheral copies. They and Drusilla Wayles leave no doubt that they find Falushe repellent. As Gersen is about to throw him out of an airboat hovering ten thousand feet above the sea, Falushe breaks his bonds, but falls to his doom.

Gersen frees the enslaved servants at the Palace, informs the planet's inhabitants that they need pay "taxes" no more, and entrusts the various clones to Navarth's eccentric care. Some months later, he chances to meet yet another, more mature clone and makes her acquaintance.
