= Polyphemus (book) =

1987 collection of stories by Michael Shea

- Dust-jacket illustration by Harry O. Morris.
- Author: Michael Shea
- Illustrator: John Stewart
- Cover artist: Harry O. Morris
- Language: English
- Genre: Science fiction, fantasy, horror
- Publisher: Arkham House
- Publication date: 1987
- Publication place: United States
- Media type: Print (hardback)
- Pages: x, 245
- ISBN: 0-87054-155-2
- OCLC: 15792325
- Dewey Decimal: 813/.54 19
- LC Class: PS3569.H39117 P65 1987

Polyphemus is a collection of science fiction, fantasy and horror stories by American writer Michael Shea. It was released in 1987 by Arkham House. It was published in an edition of 3,528 copies and was the author's first hardcover book. Most of the stories originally appeared in The Magazine of Fantasy and Science Fiction.

== Contents ==
Polyphemus contains the following stories:

- "Foreword", by Algis Budrys
- "Polyphemus"
- "The Angel of Death"
- "Uncle Tuggs"
- "The Pearls of the Vampire Queen"
- "The Horror on the #33"
- "The Extra"
- "The Autopsy"

== Reception ==
Chris Gilmore suggested readers unfamiliar with Shea's work "will do best to approach him through the showcase collection Polyphemus".

David Pringle described Polyphemus as "colourful SF stories, mostly latter-day bug-eyed monster tales and all with a fantastic or horrific tinge" and compared Shea's work to that of Clark Ashton Smith and Jack Vance. Pringle rated Polyphemus two stars out of four.

"The Autopsy" was adapted by David S. Goyer for the Netflix horror anthology show Guillermo del Toro's Cabinet of Curiosities (2022). It was directed by David Prior, and starred F. Murray Abraham as Dr. Carl Winters, Glynn Turman as sheriff Nate Craven, and Luke Roberts as Elliott Sykes.

== Sources ==
- Jaffery, Sheldon (1989). The Arkham House Companion. Mercer Island, WA: Starmont House, Inc. p. 141. ISBN 1-55742-005-X.
- Chalker, Jack L.; Mark Owings (1998). The Science-Fantasy Publishers: A Bibliographic History, 1923-1998. Westminster, MD and Baltimore: Mirage Press, Ltd. p. 56.
- Joshi, S.T. (1999). Sixty Years of Arkham House: A History and Bibliography. Sauk City, WI: Arkham House. p. 157. ISBN 0-87054-176-5.
- Nielsen, Leon (2004). Arkham House Books: A Collector's Guide. Jefferson, NC and London: McFarland & Company, Inc. p. 134. ISBN 0-7864-1785-4.
