= The Colour Out of Space =

1927 short story by H. P. Lovecraft

- Short story by H. P. Lovecraft
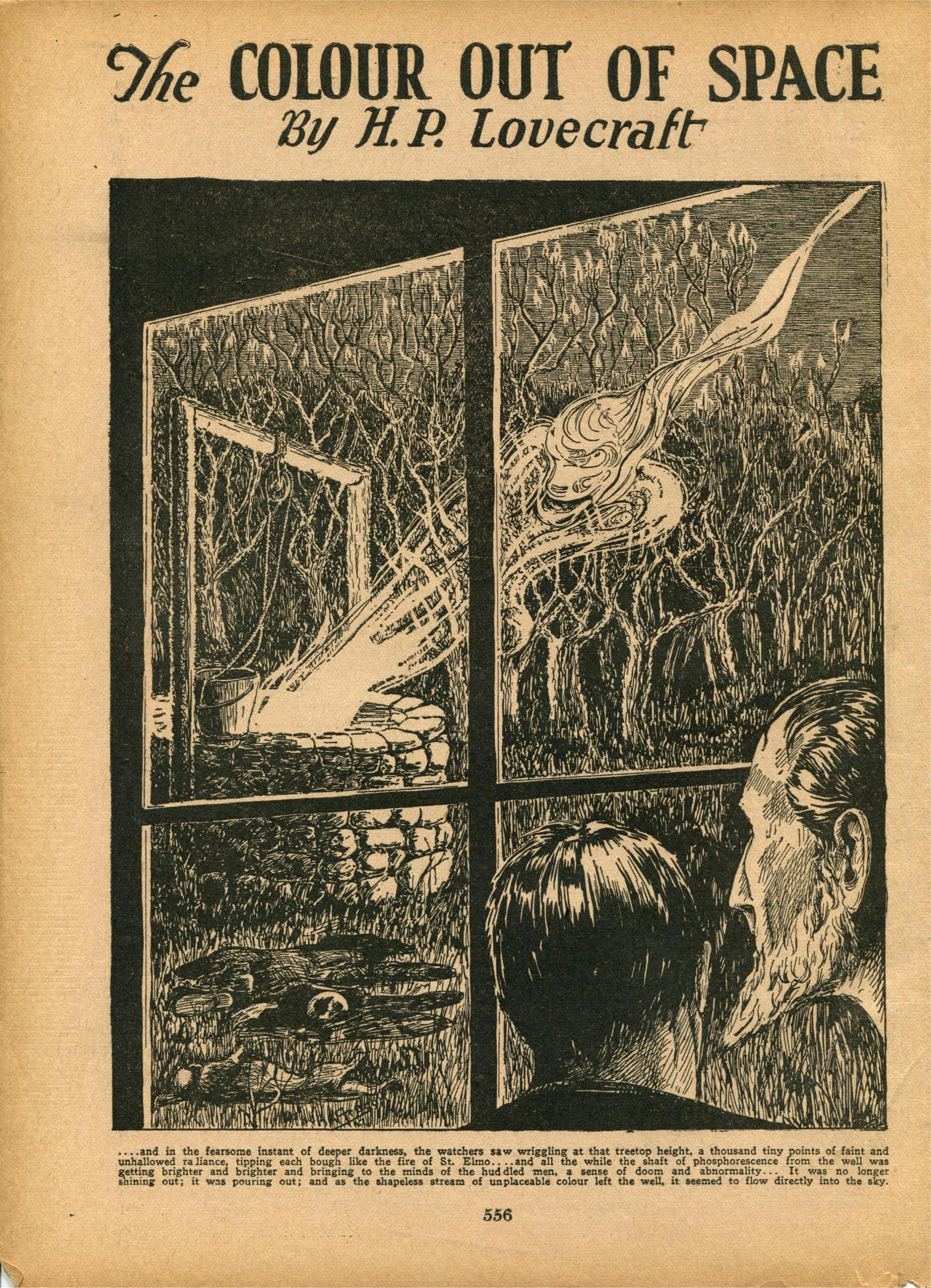
- Title page of "The Colour Out of Space" as it appeared in Amazing Stories, September 1927. Illustration by J. M. de Aragon.

Text available at Wikisource
- Country: United States
- Language: English
- Genres: Science fiction, horror

Publication
- Published in: Amazing Stories
- Media type: Print (Magazine)
- Publication date: September 1927

"The Colour Out of Space" is a science fiction/horror short story by American author H. P. Lovecraft, written in March 1927. In the tale, an unnamed narrator pieces together the story of an area known by the locals as the "blasted heath" (most likely after a line from either Milton's Paradise Lost or Shakespeare's Macbeth) in the hills west of the fictional town of Arkham, Massachusetts. The narrator discovers that many years ago a meteorite crashed there, poisoning every living being nearby: vegetation grows large but foul-tasting, animals are driven mad and deformed into grotesque shapes, and the people go insane or die one by one.

Lovecraft began writing "The Colour Out of Space" immediately after finishing his previous short novel, The Case of Charles Dexter Ward, and in the midst of final revision on his horror fiction essay "Supernatural Horror in Literature". Seeking to create a truly alien life form, he drew inspiration from numerous fiction and nonfiction sources. First appearing in the September 1927 edition of Hugo Gernsback's science fiction magazine Amazing Stories, "The Colour Out of Space" became one of Lovecraft's most popular works, and remained his personal favorite of his short stories. It has been adapted to film several times, as Die, Monster, Die! (1965), The Curse (1987), Colour from the Dark (2008), The Colour Out of Space (Die Farbe) (2010) and Color Out of Space (2019).

== Synopsis ==
The narrator, an unnamed surveyor from Boston, describes his attempts to uncover the secrets behind a shunned place referred to by the locals of the hills west of Arkham as the "blasted heath". Unable to garner any information from the townspeople, the protagonist seeks out an old and allegedly crazy man by the name of Ammi Pierce, who relates his experiences with a farmer named Nahum Gardner and his family who used to live on the property.

A meteorite crashed into Nahum's land over fifty years prior, in June 1882. At the time, local scientists take a sample from the meteorite, and are perplexed by several strange behaviors that it exhibits. The sample disappears overnight after being stored in a glass beaker. When attempting to take a second sample from the meteorite, the scientists reveal a globule encased in the meteorite emitting a strange color. It was "only by analogy that they called it a color at all", as it fell outside of the range of anything known in the visible spectrum. One of the scientists hits the globule with a hammer, and it disintegrates. Overnight, the meteorite disappears after being struck by bolts of lightning.

The following season, Nahum's crops grow unnaturally large and abundant. When he discovers that, despite their appearance, they are inedible, he becomes convinced that the meteorite has poisoned the soil. Over the following year, the problem spreads to the surrounding plants and animals, altering them in unusual ways. All of the vegetation on the farm begins to become grey and brittle.

Mrs. Gardner goes mad, and Nahum decides to keep her locked in the attic. Over time, the family becomes isolated from the neighboring farmers, and Pierce becomes their only contact with the outside world. Pierce informs Nahum that their well water has gone bad and suggests digging and drinking from a new one, but Nahum refuses to take his advice. Thaddeus, one of Nahum's sons, also goes mad, and Nahum locks him in a different room of the attic. The livestock start to take on disturbing forms and die off. Like the crops, their meat is inedible. Thaddeus dies in the attic, and Nahum buries his remains behind the farm. Merwin, another of Nahum's sons, vanishes while retrieving water from the contaminated well.

After weeks of no contact with Nahum, Pierce visits the farmstead. He meets Nahum in his house, and realizes that he, like his wife and son, has also gone mad. When asked about Zenas, Nahum's last son who was accounted for, Nahum tells Pierce that Zenas "lives in the well". Pierce ascends the stairs to the attic and finds that Mrs. Gardner has taken on a horrible form. It is implied that Pierce kills her in an act of mercy. When he descends the stairs, he finds that Nahum too has become horribly deformed. Nahum has a moment of lucidity and tells Pierce that the color that arrived on the meteorite is responsible, and that it has been siphoning the life out of the surrounding area. Shortly afterwards, Nahum dies.

Pierce leaves and returns to the farmstead with six men. The group discovers both Merwin's and Zenas's eroding skeletons at the bottom of the well, along with the bones of several other creatures. As they reflect upon their discoveries in the house, the color begins to pour out from the well. The trees start to convulse, and the greyed organic material on the farm begins to faintly glow with the color. The men flee the house as the color flies from the well into the sky and disappears. Pierce alone turns back after the color has gone and witnesses some residual part of the color attempt to ascend briefly, only to fail and return to the well. The knowledge that part of the color still resides on Earth is sufficient to disturb his mental state. When some of the men return the following day, they find only Pierce's dead horse, acres of grey dust, and untouched inorganic matter. Upon hearing the rumors of what has taken place, many of the residents of the surrounding area decide to move away.

== Background ==
Lovecraft began writing "The Colour Out of Space" in March 1927, immediately after completing The Case of Charles Dexter Ward. As he wrote the tale, however, he was also typing the final draft of his essay on horror fiction, "Supernatural Horror in Literature". Although the author himself claimed that his inspiration was the newly constructed Scituate Reservoir in Rhode Island, Lovecraft scholar S. T. Joshi believes that the planned Quabbin Reservoir in Massachusetts must have influenced him as well. American writer and pulp fiction enthusiast Will Murray cites paranormal investigator Charles Fort, and the "thunderstones" (lightning-drawing rocks that may have fallen from the sky) he describes in The Book of the Damned, as possible inspirations for the behavior of the meteorite. Andy Troy argues that the story was an allegory for the coverage of the Radium Girls scandal in The New York Times, with the symptoms of the Gardners matching the newspaper's description of radium necrosis. Edward Guimont and Horace A. Smith have proposed that the March 1926 rocket test flight by Robert H. Goddard on a farm in Auburn, Massachusetts may also have served as an influence on the story.

Lovecraft was disappointed at the all-too human depiction of aliens in other works of fiction, and his goal for "Colour" was to create an entity that was truly alien. In doing so, he drew inspiration from a number of sources describing colors outside of the visible spectrum. S.T. Joshi points to Hugh Elliott's Modern Science and Materialism, a 1919 nonfiction book that mentions the "extremely limited" senses of humans, such that of the many "aethereal waves" striking the eyes, "The majority cannot be perceived by the retina at all". Lovecraft had used this concept previously, in his 1920 short story "From Beyond". Completed by the end of March, "The Colour Out of Space" first appeared in Hugo Gernsback's science fiction magazine Amazing Stories in September 1927. The story was illustrated by J. M. de Aragón, an artist who produced occasional artwork for the magazine.

== Reception and legacy ==
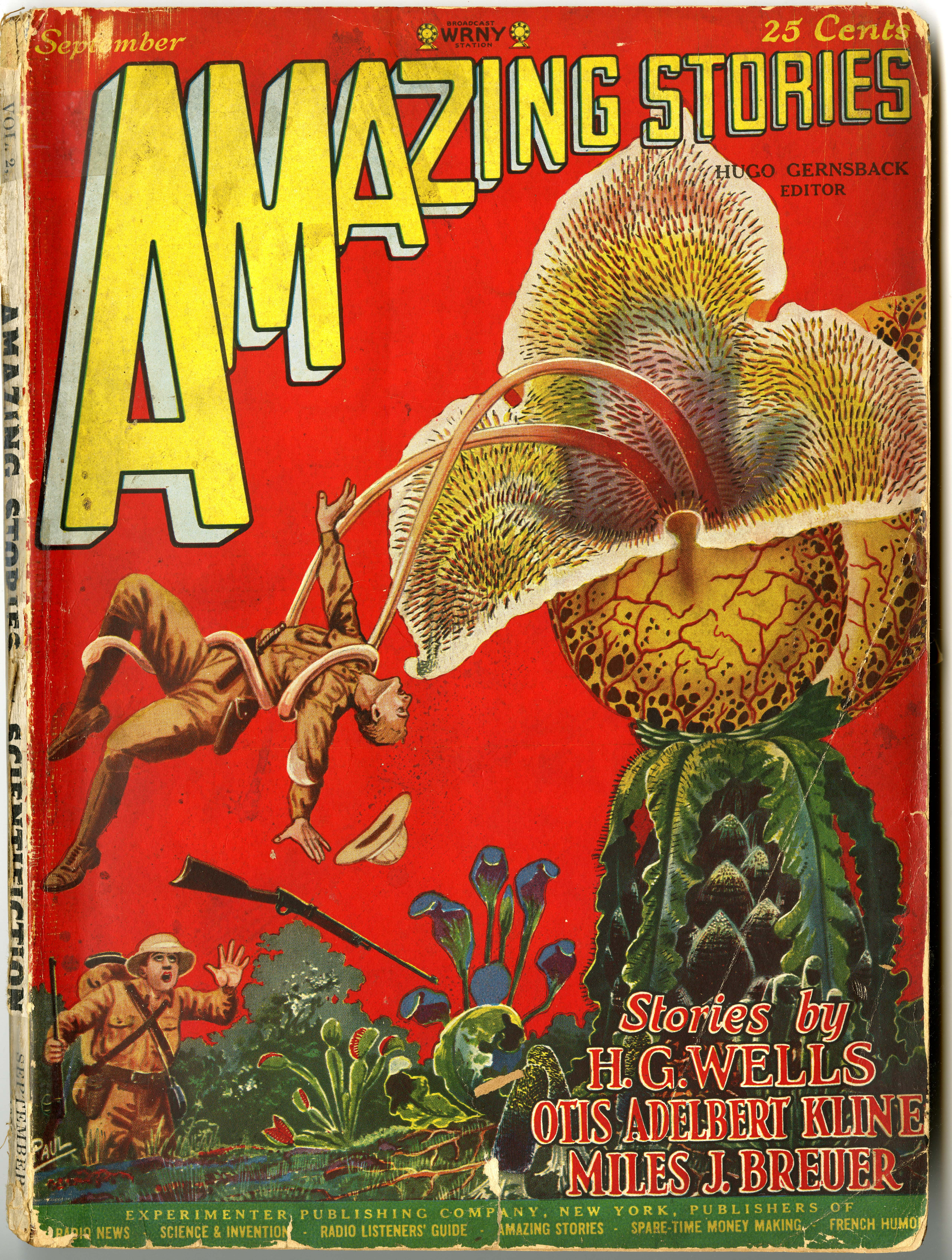
"The Colour Out of Space" appeared in the September 1927 edition of Amazing Stories, published by Experimenter Publishing.

"The Colour Out of Space" became the only work from Amazing Stories to make Edward O'Brien's anthology of The Best American Short Stories, appearing in the 1928 "Roll of Honor". Gernsback paid Lovecraft only $25 (approximately $463 in present-day terms) and was late in doing so, leading Lovecraft to refer to the publisher as "Hugo the Rat". He never again submitted anything to the publication. Lovecraft did not write another major short story until the following year, when he authored "The Dunwich Horror", although he did pen "History of the Necronomicon" and "Ibid" as minor works in-between, as well as an account of a Halloween night's dream that he called "The Very Old Folk".

In addition to being Lovecraft's personal favourite of his short stories, critics generally consider "The Colour Out of Space" one of his best works, and the first with his trademark blending of science fiction and horror. Lovecraft scholar Donald R. Burleson referred to the tale as "one of his stylistically and conceptually finest short stories". Joshi praises the work as one of Lovecraft's best and most frightening, particularly for the vagueness of the description of the story's eponymous horror. He also lauded the work as Lovecraft's most successful attempt to create something entirely outside of the human experience, as the entity's motive (if any) is unknown and it is impossible to discern whether or not the "colour" is emotional, moral, or even conscious. His only criticism is that it is "just a little too long". E. F. Bleiler described "The Colour Out of Space" as "an excellent story, one of Lovecraft's finest works; in my opinion the best original story to appear in Amazing Stories". The text of "The Colour Out of Space", like many of Lovecraft's works, has fallen into public domain and can be accessed in several compilations of the author's work, as well as on the Internet. It also had a strong influence on Brian Aldiss's The Saliva Tree, which has been seen as a rewriting of Lovecraft's tale. In 1984, the novel The Color Out of Time by Michael Shea was published as a sequel to the original novelette.

=== Adaptations ===
The 1965 film Die, Monster, Die!, directed by Daniel Haller, is based on "The Colour Out of Space". The film stars Nick Adams, Suzan Farmer, and Boris Karloff. Lovecraft scholar Don G. Smith claims that, of the scenes that are derived from Lovecraft's work, the "blasted heath doesn't live up to Lovecraft's description" and asserts that, overall, the film does not capture Lovecraft's intent to "...play...with the idea of an alien life form completely different from anything humans can imagine". Smith considers Haller's work an imitation of Roger Corman's Edgar Allan Poe films, rather than a serious attempt to adapt Lovecraft's tale. Another adaptation, The Curse (1987), was directed by David Keith and stars Wil Wheaton, Claude Akins, Cooper Huckabee, and John Schneider. It more closely follows the plot of Lovecraft's work, albeit set in the 1980s. Lovecraft scholar Charles P. Mitchell referred to the film as faithful to the author's original work, but Mitchell claimed that "[t]he last twenty minutes of the film are so disjointed that they virtually ruin the entire film."

The 2008 film Colour from the Dark, directed by Ivan Zuccon, is an adaptation set in Italy. The film stars Michael Segal, Debbie Rochon, Marysia Kay, Gerry Shanahan, and Eleanor James. Bloody Disgusting praised the film, stating Zuccon "managed to do the famous writer's twisted tale of unseen terror a really fair share of justice by capturing the bleak, grotesque and utterly frightening atmosphere of the source material very, very well". The 2010 film Die Farbe (The Color), directed by Huan Vu, is an adaptation set in Germany. It is shot mainly in black and white, the exception being the "Colour" itself. S. T. Joshi described it as "the best Lovecraft film adaptation ever made". The 2018 film Annihilation—itself based on the 2014 novel of the same name by Jeff VanderMeer—contains numerous plot similarities with Lovecraft's story, most prominently a colorful alien entity that crash lands on earth and begins mutating nearby plant and animal life.

A new version was adapted by writer/director Richard Stanley and released in 2019 under the title Color Out of Space. This film stars Nicolas Cage and Joely Richardson, and was produced by Elijah Wood through his production company SpectreVision. It has a contemporary setting but keeps Lovecraft's plot intact. It is intended to be the first film in a trilogy of Lovecraft adaptations set in a shared universe.

Stephen King says that his 1987 novel The Tommyknockers, in which residents of a small town in rural Maine are physically and mentally affected by the emanations from an alien ship unearthed in the nearby woods, and which also features a major character named Gardner, was strongly influenced by "The Colour Out of Space". Like many of his works at that time, it was adapted into a TV miniseries, broadcast in 1993; in 2018 it was reported to be in development as a feature film.

The Japanese comic artist Gou Tanabe adapted it into The Colour Out of Space, published in 2015.

== See also ==
- 1927 in science fiction
- Impossible color
