= Jack Vance =

American writer (1916–2013)

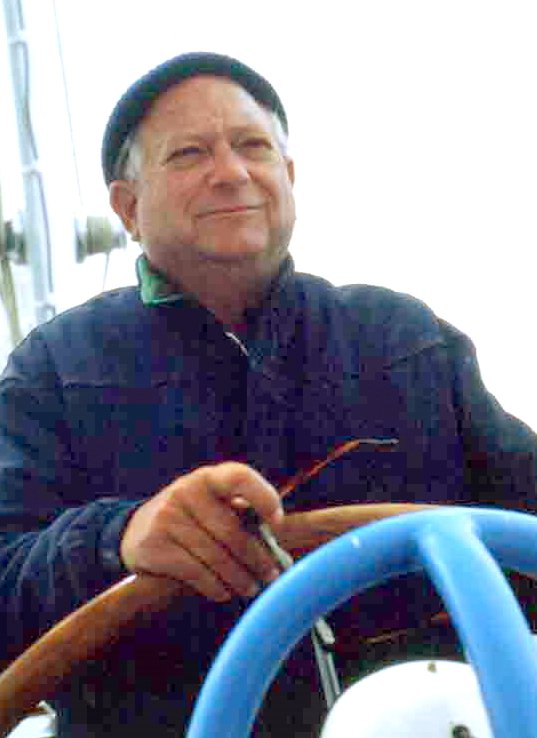
- Vance at the helm of his boat on San Francisco Bay in the early 1980s
- Born: John Holbrook Vance; August 28, 1916; San Francisco, California, U.S.
- Died: May 26, 2013 (aged 96); Oakland, California, U.S.
- Occupation: Writer
- Writing career
- Period: 1950–2009 (books)
- Genres: Fantasy, science fiction, mystery
- Notable work: Dying Earth
- Notable awards: Hugo Award; 1963, 1967, 2010; Nebula Award; 1967 and career honors

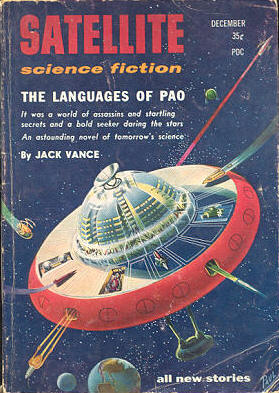
Vance's The Languages of Pao was originally published in the December 1957 issue of Satellite Science Fiction, under what is likely the last SF magazine cover by Frank R. Paul

John Holbrook Vance (August 28, 1916 – May 26, 2013) was an American writer of fantasy, science fiction, and mysteries. He wrote several mystery novels under pen names, including Ellery Queen.

Vance won the World Fantasy Award for Life Achievement in 1984, and he was a Guest of Honor at the 1992 World Science Fiction Convention in Orlando, Florida. The Science Fiction and Fantasy Writers of America made him its 15th Grand Master in 1997, and the Science Fiction Hall of Fame inducted him in 2001, its sixth class of two deceased and two living writers.

His most notable awards included Hugo Awards in 1963 for The Dragon Masters, in 1967 for The Last Castle, and in 2010 for his memoir This Is Me, Jack Vance!; the Nebula Award in 1966, also for The Last Castle; the Jupiter Award in 1975 and the World Fantasy Award in 1990 for Lyonesse: Madouc, and the Edgar Award in 1961 for the best first mystery novel for The Man in the Cage.

His first publications were stories in science fiction magazines. As he became well known, he published novellas and novels, many of which were translated into French, Dutch, Spanish, Russian, Italian, and German. An Integral Edition of all Vance's works was published in 44 volumes and in 2010 a six-volume The Complete Jack Vance was released. A 2009 profile in The New York Times Magazine described Vance as "one of American literature's most distinctive and undervalued voices". He died at his home in Oakland, California, on May 26, 2013, aged 96.

== Biography ==
Vance's great-grandfather is believed to have arrived in California from Michigan a decade before the Gold Rush and married a San Francisco woman. Early family records were apparently destroyed in the fire following the 1906 San Francisco earthquake. Vance's maternal grandfather, L. M. (Ludwig Mathias) Hoefler, was a successful lawyer in San Francisco.

Vance grew up in the family's large house in San Francisco on Filbert Street. When Vance's father left the family to live on his ranch in Mexico, the family's house in San Francisco was rented out to the father's sister. With the separation of his parents, and the loss of use of the San Francisco house, Vance's mother moved him and his siblings to their maternal grandfather's California ranch near Oakley in the delta of the Sacramento River. This setting formed Vance's love of the outdoors, and allowed him time to indulge his passion as an avid reader of his mother's large book collection, which included Edgar Rice Burroughs’ Tarzan of the Apes and his Barsoom novels and Jules Verne's The Mysterious Island. When Vance explored the nearby town, he started reading pulp fiction magazines at the local drugstore.

With the death of his grandfather, who had supported the family, which coincided with the economic challenges of the Great Depression, the Vance family’s fortune dwindled, and Vance was forced to leave junior college and work to support himself, assisting his mother when able. Vance plied many trades for short stretches: as a bellhop (a "miserable year"), in a cannery, and on a gold dredge. Vance described this era as a time of personal change: “Over a span of four or five years, I developed from an impractical little intellectual into a rather reckless young man, competent at many skills and crafts, and determined to try every phase of life.”

He subsequently entered the University of California, Berkeley, and over the next six years studied mining engineering, physics, journalism, and English. Vance wrote one of his first science fiction stories for an English class assignment: his professor commented in a scornful tone, "We also have a piece of science fiction"—Vance's first negative review.

He worked as an electrician in the naval shipyards at Pearl Harbor, Hawaii, for "56¢ an hour," and worked for a time as part of a degaussing crew. The attack on Pearl Harbor took place about a month after he quit.

Vance graduated in 1942. Weak eyesight prevented military service. He found a job as a rigger at the Kaiser Shipyard in Richmond, California, and enrolled in an Army Intelligence program to learn Japanese, but dropped out. In 1943, he memorized an eye chart and became an able seaman in the Merchant Marine. In later years, boating remained his favorite recreation; boats and voyages are a frequent motif in his work. He worked as a seaman, a rigger, a surveyor, a ceramicist, and a carpenter before he established himself fully as a writer, which did not occur until the 1970s.

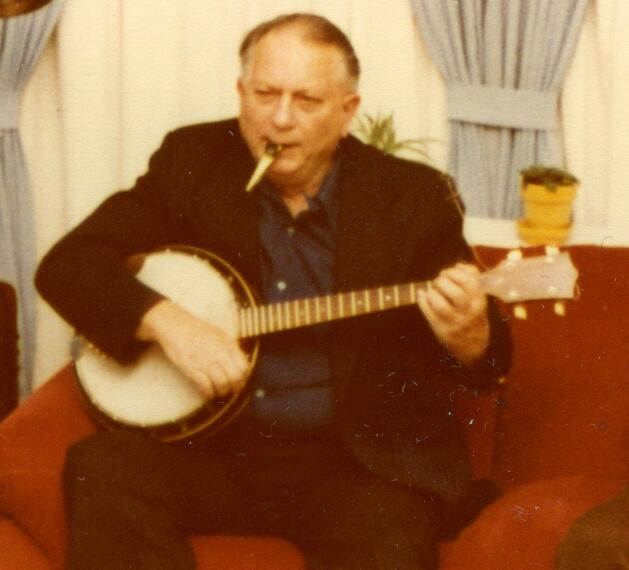
Jack Vance playing the jazz banjo and kazoo in 1979 in San Francisco

From his youth, Vance had been fascinated by Dixieland and traditional jazz. He was an amateur of the cornet and ukulele, often accompanying himself with a kazoo, and was a competent harmonica player. His first published writings were jazz reviews for The Daily Californian (his college paper), and music is an element in many of his works.

In 1946, Vance met and married Norma Genevieve Ingold (died March 25, 2008), another Cal student. Vance continued to live in Oakland, in a house he built and extended with his family over the years, including a hand-carved wooden ceiling from Kashmir. The Vances traveled extensively, including on one around-the-world voyage, and often spent several months at a time living in places like Ireland, Tahiti, South Africa, Positano (in Italy) and on a houseboat on Lake Nagin in Kashmir.

Vance began trying to become a professional writer in the late 1940s, as part of the San Francisco Renaissance, a movement of experimentation in literature and the arts. His first lucrative sale was one of the early Magnus Ridolph stories to Twentieth Century Fox, who also hired him as a screenwriter for the Captain Video television series. The proceeds supported the Vances for a year's travel in Europe. There are various references to the Bay Area Bohemian life in his work. In the 1950s, Vance started a pottery and ceramics hobby, buying a kiln; this interest was an influence on his story "The Potters of Firsk” (1950).

Science fiction authors Frank Herbert and Poul Anderson were among Vance's closest friends. In the early 1950s, when Frank Herbert was a reporter, he interviewed Vance, and the men became friends. They moved to Mexico with their families to establish a "writer's colony" at Lake Chapala, near Guadalajara. In 1962, Vance, Herbert, and Anderson jointly built a houseboat which they sailed in the Sacramento Delta. Vance's interest in houseboats led him to depict them in "The Moon Moth" (1961), The Palace of Love (1967), and Wyst: Alastor 1716 (1978).

In the early 1980s, Vance became increasingly interested in sailing, and he started building a 36-foot trimaran. Later, he owned Venture (a 17-foot cutter-rigged boat), Columbia (a 35-foot ketch-rigged boat), and finally Hinano (a 45-foot boat). While Vance derived pleasure from his sailing hobby, his increasingly poor eyesight and the high costs of outfitting, berthing, and maintaining the vessel led him to sell Hinano. Vance's failing eyesight also led him to cease his amateur jazz hobby.

Although legally blind since the 1980s, Vance continued to write with the aid of BigEd software, written especially for him by Kim Kokkonen. His final novel was Lurulu. Although Vance had stated Lurulu would be his final book, he subsequently completed an autobiography, which was published in July 2009.

=== Death ===
Vance died on the morning of May 26, 2013, at the age of 96 in his home in the Oakland Hills. Vance's son John Holbrook Vance II described the cause as the complications of old age, saying "everything just finally caught up with him". Tributes to Vance were given by various authors, including George R. R. Martin, Michael Moorcock, Neil Gaiman, and Elizabeth Bear. Steven Gould, president of the Science Fiction Writers of America, described Vance as "one of the greatest science fiction and fantasy writers of the 20th century". A memorial site set up by his family to post tributes received hundreds of messages in the days following his death.

== Work ==
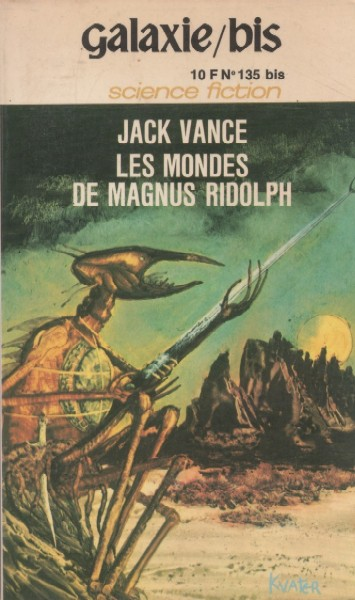
French edition of The Many Worlds of Magnus Ridolph, illustrating "The Kokod Warriors"

Vance made his debut in print with "The World-Thinker", a 16-page story published by Sam Merwin in Thrilling Wonder Stories, Summer 1945. His lifetime output totals more than 60 books—perhaps almost 90. His work has been published in three categories: science fiction, fantasy, and mystery. Among Vance's earliest published work was a set of fantasy stories written while he served in the merchant marine during the war. They appeared in 1950, several years after Vance had started publishing science fiction in the pulp magazines, under the title The Dying Earth.

Vance wrote many science fiction short stories in the late 1940s and through the 1950s, which were published in magazines. Most of his novels written during this period were mysteries, but a few were science fiction. Few were published at the time, but Vance continued to write mysteries into the early 1970s. In total, he wrote 15 novels outside of science fiction and fantasy, including the extended outline, The Telephone was Ringing in the Dark, published only by the VIE (Vance Integral Edition), and three books published under the Ellery Queen pseudonym. Some of these are not mysteries, such as Bird Isle, and many fit uneasily in the category. These stories are set in and around his native San Francisco, except for one set in Italy and another in Africa. Two begin in San Francisco but take to the sea.

Many themes important to his more famous science fiction novels appeared first in the mysteries. The most obvious is the "book of dreams", which appears in Bad Ronald and The View from Chickweed's Window, prior to being featured in The Book of Dreams. The revenge theme is also more prominent in certain mysteries than in the science fiction (The View from Chickweed's Window in particular). Bad Ronald was adapted to a TV film of the same name aired on ABC in 1974, as well as a French production (Méchant garçon) in 1992; this and Man in the Cage are the only works by Vance to be made into film to date.

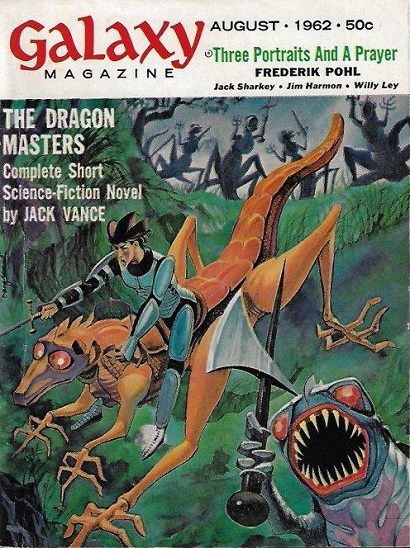
Vance's Hugo Award-winning novella The Dragon Masters was the cover story on the August 1962 issue of Galaxy Science Fiction.

Certain of the science fiction stories are also mysteries, penned using his full name John Holbrook Vance, three under the house pseudonym Ellery Queen, and one each using the pseudonyms Alan Wade, Peter Held, John van See, and Jay Kavanse. Some editions of his published works give his year of birth as 1920. In addition to the comic Magnus Ridolph stories, two major stories feature the effectuator Miro Hetzel, a futuristic detective, and Araminta Station is largely concerned with solving various murders. Vance returned to the "dying Earth" setting (a far distant future in which the sun is slowly going out, and magic and technology coexist) to write the picaresque adventures of the ne'er-do-well scoundrel Cugel the Clever, and those of the magician Rhialto the Marvellous. These books were written in 1963, 1978 and 1981. His other major fantasy work, Lyonesse (a trilogy comprising Suldrun's Garden, The Green Pearl, and Madouc), was completed in 1989 and set on a mythological archipelago off the coast of France in the early Middle Ages.

Vance's stories written for pulps in the 1940s and 1950s covered many science fiction themes, with a tendency to emphasize mysterious and biological themes (ESP, genetics, brain parasites, body switching, other dimensions, cultures) rather than technical ones. Robots, for example, are almost entirely absent, though the short story "The Uninhibited Robot" features a computer gone awry. Many of the early stories are comic. By the 1960s, Vance had developed a futuristic setting that he came to call the Gaean Reach, a fictional region of space settled by humans. Thereafter, all his science fiction was, more or less explicitly, set therein. The Gaean Reach per se is loose and expanding, old Earth (Gaia) being the center. Each planet has its own history, state of development and culture. Within the Reach conditions tend to be peaceable and commerce tends to dominate. At the edges of the Reach, out in the lawless Beyond, conditions are usually much less secure.

Vance influenced many writers in the genre. Most notably, Michael Shea wrote a sequel to Eyes of the Overworld, featuring Cugel the Clever, before Vance did one himself (called Cugel's Saga). Vance gave permission, and the book by Shea went into print before Vance's. Shea's book, A Quest for Simbilis, is entirely in keeping with the vision of Vance. Cugel is a complete rogue, who is nevertheless worthy of sympathy in always failing to achieve his goals.

=== Literary influences ===
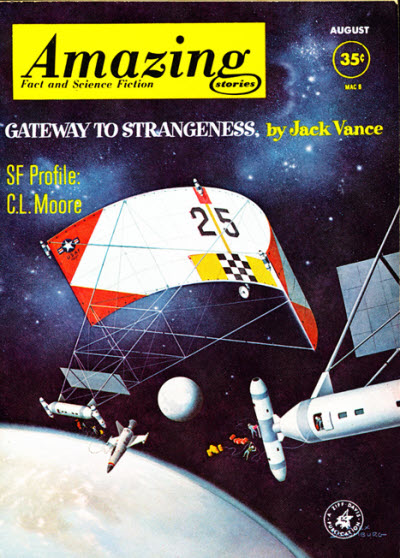
Vance's novella "Gateway to Strangeness" was the cover story in the August 1962 issue of Amazing Stories, illustrated by Alex Schomburg. Under the title "Dust of Far Suns", it became the title piece in a Vance story collection in 1981.

When asked about literary influences, Vance most often cited Jeffery Farnol, a writer of adventure books, whose style of "high" language he mentions (the Farnol title Guyfford of Weare being a typical instance); P. G. Wodehouse, an influence apparent in Vance's taste for overbearing aunts; and L. Frank Baum, whose fantasy elements were directly borrowed by Vance (see The Emerald City of Oz). In the introduction to Dowling and Strahan's The Jack Vance Treasury, Vance mentions that his childhood reading including Edgar Rice Burroughs, Jules Verne, Robert W. Chambers, science fiction published by Edward Stratemeyer, the magazines Weird Tales and Amazing Stories, and Lord Dunsany. According to pulp editor Sam Merwin, Vance's earliest magazine submissions in the 1940s were heavily influenced by the style of James Branch Cabell. Fantasy historian Lin Carter notes several probable lasting influences of Cabell on Vance's work, and suggests that the early "pseudo-Cabell" experiments bore fruit in The Dying Earth (1950). Science fiction critic Don Herron cites Clark Ashton Smith as an influence on Vance's style and characters' names.

=== Characteristics and commentary ===
Vance's science fiction runs the gamut from stories written for pulps in the 1940s to multi-volume tales set in the space age. Scott Bradfield states that Vance "wrote about incomprehensibly far-off futures that weren’t driven by the splashy intergalactic military conflicts of his Golden Age predecessors, such as E.E. Doc Smith or Robert A. Heinlein. Instead, Vance’s futures are marked by rich, panoramic socioeconomic systems." While Vance's stories have a wide variety of temporal settings, a majority of them belong to a period long after humanity has colonized other stars, culminating in the development of a fictional region of interstellar space called the Gaean Reach. In its early phase, exhibited by the Oikumene of the Demon Princes series, this expanding, loose and pacific agglomerate has an aura of colonial adventure, commerce, and exoticism. Later it becomes peace-loving and stolidly middle class.

Vance's stories are seldom concerned directly with war and the conflicts are rarely direct. If there are battles, such as in the slave revolt against the nobility at the end of The Last Castle, they are depicted in an abbreviated length, as Vance is more interested in the social and political context than the clashing of swords. Sometimes at the edges of the Reach or in the lawless areas of Beyond, a planet is menaced or craftily exploited. Some more extensive battles are described in The Dragon Masters, The Miracle Workers, and the Lyonesse Trilogy, in which medieval-style combat abounds. His characters usually become inadvertently enmeshed in low-intensity conflicts between alien cultures; this is the case in Emphyrio, the Tschai series, the Durdane series, and the comic stories in Galactic Effectuator, featuring Miro Hetzel. Personal, cultural, social, or political conflicts are the central concerns. This is most particularly the case in the Cadwal series, though it is equally characteristic of the three Alastor books, Maske: Thaery, and, one way or another, in most of his science fiction novels.

Another way in which Vance expands the usually narrow focus of most speculative fiction writers is the extensive details ranging from the culture of language to food, music, and rituals. In The Languages of Pao, after a planet with a passive, lazy and backwards culture is invaded and occupied, the planet's leader orders three new languages developed, to make his people more aggressive, industrious and inventive. In the short story "The Moon Moth", natives must master a number of musical instruments in order to communicate with each other. Spoken words are modulated to acquire different meanings, or may be said to be given full meaning (respect, derision or sarcasm), by means of the musical sounds. These details paint a far more detailed and complex picture of life and cultures in his books.

The "Joe Bain" stories (The Fox Valley Murders, The Pleasant Grove Murders, and an unfinished outline published by the VIE) are set in an imaginary northern California county; these are the nearest to the classical mystery form, with a rural policeman as protagonist. Bird Isle, by contrast, is not a mystery at all, but a Wodehousian idyll (also set near San Francisco), while The Flesh Mask or Strange People ... emphasize psychological drama. The theme of both The House on Lily Street and Bad Ronald is solipsistic megalomania, taken up again in the Demon Princes cycle of science fiction novels.

Three books published under the house name Ellery Queen were written to editorial requirements and heavily revised by the publisher. (Volume 45 of The Vance Integral Edition contains the original text for the three Ellery Queen novels. Vance previously refused to acknowledge them for their degree of rewriting.) Four others reflect Vance's world travels: Strange People, Queer Notions based on his stay in Positano, Italy; The Man in the Cage, based on a trip to Morocco; The Dark Ocean, set on a merchant marine vessel; and The Deadly Isles, based on a stay in Tahiti.

The mystery novels reveal much about Vance's evolution as a science fiction and fantasy writer. He stopped working in the mystery genre in the early 1970s, except for science-fiction mysteries; see below. Bad Ronald is especially noteworthy for its portrayal of a trial-run for Howard Alan Treesong of The Book of Dreams. The Edgar-Award-winning The Man in the Cage is a thriller set in North Africa at around the period of the French-Algerian war. A Room to Die In is a classic 'locked-room' murder mystery featuring a strong-willed young woman as the amateur detective. Bird Isle, a mystery set at a hotel on an island off the California coast, reflects Vance's taste for farce.

Vance's two rural Northern California mysteries featuring Sheriff Joe Bain were well received by the critics. The New York Times said of The Fox Valley Murders: "Mr. Vance has created the county with the same detailed and loving care with which, in the science fiction he writes as Jack Vance, he can create a believable alien planet." Dorothy B. Hughes, in The Los Angeles Times, wrote that it was "fat with character and scene". As for the second Bain novel, The New York Times said: "I like regionalism in American detective stories, and I enjoy reading about the problems of a rural county sheriff ... and I bless John Holbrook Vance for the best job of satisfying these tastes with his wonderful tales of Sheriff Joe Bain ...".

Vance has also written mysteries set in his science fiction universes. An early 1950s short story series features Magnus Ridolph, an interstellar adventurer and amateur detective who is elderly and not prone to knocking anyone down, and whose exploits appear to have been inspired, in part, by those of Jack London's South Seas adventurer, Captain David Grief. The "Galactic Effectuator" novelettes feature Miro Hetzel, a figure who resembles Ridolph in his blending of detecting and troubleshooting (the "effectuating" indicated by the title). A number of the other science fiction novels include mystery, spy thriller, or crime-novel elements: The Houses of Iszm, Son of the Tree, the Alastor books Trullion and Marune, the Cadwal series, and large parts of the Demon Princes series.

According to writer Michael Chabon, "Jack Vance is the most painful case of all the writers I love who I feel don’t get the credit they deserve. If ‘The Last Castle’ or ‘The Dragon Masters’ had the name Italo Calvino on it, or just a foreign name, it would be received as a profound meditation, but because he's Jack Vance and published in Amazing Whatever, there's this insurmountable barrier."

Vance fans developed a website called Totality (pharesm.org), which enables users to do electronic searches of the Vance Integral Edition texts.

== Publication ==
For most of his career, Vance's work suffered the vicissitudes common to most writers in his chosen field: ephemeral publication of stories in magazine form, short-lived softcover editions, in which stories sometimes were insensitively edited beyond his control. As he became more widely recognized, conditions improved, and his works became internationally renowned among aficionados. Much of his work has been translated into several languages, including Dutch, Esperanto, French, Spanish, Russian, and Italian. (Note: WorldCat participating libraries report holding some editions of books by Vance in 14 languages other than English—perhaps all or most of his books in French, Dutch, Spanish, and German.) Beginning in the 1960s, Jack Vance's work has also been extensively translated into German. In the large German-language market, his books continue to be widely read.

Vance was an original member of the Swordsmen and Sorcerers' Guild of America (SAGA), a loose-knit group of heroic fantasy authors founded in the 1960s and led by Lin Carter. Its purpose was to promote the sword and sorcery subgenre (such as Dying Earth stories by Vance), and some new works were published in Flashing Swords! anthologies edited by Carter, in both mass-market paperback and Doubleday Science Fiction Book Club editions.

In 1976, the fantasy/sf small press Underwood-Miller released their first publication, the first hardcover edition of The Dying Earth in a high-quality limited edition of just over 1000 copies. Other titles in the "Dying Earth" cycle also received hardcover treatment from Underwood-Miller shortly thereafter, such as The Eyes of the Overworld and Cugel's Saga. After these first publications and until the mid-1990s, Underwood-Miller published many of Vance's works, including his mystery fiction, often in limited editions featuring dustjacket artwork by leading fantasy artists. The entire Jack Vance output from Underwood-Miller comes close to a complete collection of Vance's previously published works, many of which had not seen hardcover publication. Also, many of these editions are described as "the author's preferred text", meaning that they have not been drastically edited. In the mid-1990s, Tim Underwood and Charles Miller parted company. However, they have continued to publish Vance titles individually, including such works as Emphyrio and To Live Forever by Miller, and a reprint edition of The Eyes of the Overworld by Underwood. Because of the low print-run on many of these titles, often they could only be found in science fiction bookstores at the time of their release.

=== The Vance Integral Edition ===
An Integral Edition of all Vance's works was published in a limited edition of 44 hardback volumes. A special 45th volume contains the three novels Vance wrote as Ellery Queen. This edition was created from 1999 to 2006 by 300 volunteers working via the internet, under the aegis of the author.

In 2010, Afton House Books presented The Complete Jack Vance ISBN 978-0-9825953-0-5 in six large volumes using texts prepared by the Vance Integral Edition. Volume six has a table of contents for the volumes; otherwise there is no exegesis. Issues of the project's magazine Cosmopolis describe the production process (of interest to anyone wishing accurate transcription of scanned text) and the detection of some surprising errors such as the scanning of "and" being recognised as "arid" (Cosmopolis 17, page 8) yet resulting in a sentence that is both grammatically acceptable and plausible in context: "It was hot, arid dusty." Similarly, there is no bibliography of where the stories have previously been published. Cover art may be found via Category:Jack Vance book cover images or at geofftaylor-artist.com and many other places.

In 2012, Spatterlight Press started offering DRM-free e-books editions of many of the works of Jack Vance, based on the source texts collected by the Integral Edition project. It is the intent of Spatterlight Press to publish the complete Integral Edition in e-book form, and also as print-on-demand paperbacks. Gollancz uses the VIE texts in their "SF Gateway" editions starting in 2012.

== Works inspired by Vance ==
- A Quest for Simbilis by Michael Shea (DAW, NY, 1974; authorized sequel of the Cugel novel Eyes of the Overworld although Vance later wrote his own sequel Cugel the Clever; Shea also wrote Nifft the Lean (DAW, NY, 1982), and The Mines of Behemoth (1997) about a Cugel-like character; and In Yana, the Touch of Undying (DAW, NY, 1985) which is also Vancian. A Quest for Simbilis was reprinted in 2020 by Spatterlight Press under the "Paladins of Vance" label.).
- The Archonate series by Matthew Hughes (beginning with Fools Errant (Aspect Books, 2001)) is set in a Vancean universe which at long intervals changes between running on science and rational cause-and-effect to magic and sympathetic association, with cataclysmic effects for its inhabitants. Stories set before this change, including the Henghis Hapthorn and Luff Imbry series, take place in a futuristic space opera setting reminiscent of Vance's Gaean Reach while those set after, including the Raffalon and Baldemar series, are in the Dying Earth subgenre. Hughes also published an authorised sequel to the Demon Princes series with Spatterlight Press under the "Paladins of Vance" label; titled Barbarians of the Beyond, the book was released in summer 2021.
- Phaedra: Alastor 824 by Tais Teng (Spatterlight Press, 2019) (authorised Alastor Cluster novel under the "Paladins of Vance" label.)
- Dinosaur Park by Hayford Peirce (Tor, NY, 1994).
- Fane by David M. Alexander (longtime Vance friend). (Pocket Books, NY, 1981).
- The Pharaoh Contract (Bantam, 1991), Emperor of Everything (Bantam, 1991), Orpheus Machine (Bantam, 1992) by Ray Aldridge.
- Gene Wolfe has acknowledged that The Dying Earth influenced his The Book of the New Sun.
- Dan Simmons's Hyperion Cantos has many echoes of Vance, explicitly acknowledged in one of the later books.
- The Golden Age by John C. Wright has some similarities to Jack Vance's works, including an ornamented language, and a baroque and sterile culture toppled by a lone individualist.
- The Arbiter Tales (1995–1996), three novels by L. Warren Douglas, were strongly influenced by Vance's Alastor Cluster stories. (Douglas's first novel, A Plague of Change (1992), is dedicated to Jack Vance.)
- The Dog of the North (2008), a fantasy by Tim Stretton, is strongly influenced by Vance, as noted in the acknowledgements. He outlines his debt to Vance on his blog.
- Songs of the Dying Earth (2009), a tribute anthology to Jack Vance's seminal Dying Earth series, edited by George R. R. Martin and Gardner Dozois, both avid Vance fans.
- The Dungeons & Dragons role-playing game and associated literature used a magic system inspired in part by Jack Vance's Dying Earth series: notably, magic users in the game forget spells they have learned immediately upon casting them, and must re-study them in order to cast them again; indeed, this whole system of magic is commonly known as 'Vancian Magic'. The Dying Earth and The Eyes of the Overworld are featured in the "Appendix N: Inspirational and Educational Reading" section of the 1st edition of the Dungeon Masters Guide and in the "Appendix E: Inspirational Reading" section of the 5th edition of the Player's Handbook. One of the prominent villains in the game, Vecna, is named after Vance, his name being an anagram of the author's surname.
- Other role-playing games include: Lyonesse, Dying Earth, Fallen London, and Talislanta (originally designed by Stephen Michael Sechi).
- A Song of Ice and Fire by George R. R. Martin has a minor character, "Lord Vance of Wayfarer's Rest", with daughters named Liane, Rhialta, and Emphyria for Liane the Wayfarer, Rhialto the Marvellous, and Emphyrio, respectively.
- Intergalactic Words: Articles for Consideration (2011), a series of articles by Joseph Wykel, is strongly influenced by Vance, particularly the article Solo Ball Future about the dying sun.
- Jack of Shadows (1971) by Roger Zelazny. According to the novel's foreword: "In this, my tenth book, I'd decided to try for something on the order of those rare and exotic settings I admired so much in so many of Jack Vance's stories. It seemed only fair then, once I'd worked things out, to find a title with 'Jack' in it as a private bit of homage publicly displayed. Now you all know."

== Sources ==
- Michael Andre-Driussi (1997). Vance Space: A Rough Guide to the Planets of Alastor Cluster, the Gaean Reach, the Oikumene, & other exotic sectors from the Science Fiction of Jack Vance, San Francisco: Sirius Fiction. An expanded edition under the title Handbook of Vance Space was released by the same publisher in 2014.
- Brown, Charles N.; Contento, William G. "The Locus Index to Science Fiction (1984-1998)". LocusMag. Locus Publications.
- Contento, William G. (2008). "Index to Science Fiction Anthologies and Collections" (combined ed.). Archived from the original on April 12, 2019.
- A.E. Cunningham, ed. (2000) Jack Vance: Critical appreciations and a bibliography, Boston Spa, UK: The British Library
- Jerry Hewett and Daryl F. Mallett (1994) The Work of Jack Vance: An Annotated Bibliography & Guide, [Bibliographies of Modern Authors, nr. 29], San Bernardino, CA, Penn Valley, CA, & Lancaster, PA: Borgo Press
- Levack, Daniel J.H.; Underwood, Tim (1978). Fantasms. San Francisco: Underwood/Miller.
- David G. Mead (2002) An Encyclopedia of Jack Vance: 20th Century Science Fiction Writer [Studies in American Literature, vol 50], Lewiston, New York: Edwin Mellen Press
- Jack Rawlins (1986) Demon Prince: The Dissonant Worlds of Jack Vance, [Milford Series Popular Writers of Today, vol 40], San Bernardino, CA: [publisher missing]
- Dan Temianka, ed. (1992) The Jack Vance Lexicon: From Ahulph to Zipangote, Novato, CA & Lancaster, PA: [publisher missing]
- Tim Underwood and Chuck Miller [eds.] (1980) Jack Vance, [Writers of the 21st Century Series], New York, NY: [publisher missing]
