= Michaelmas (disambiguation) =

Michaelmas is a day in the Christian calendar.

Michaelmas may also refer to:

- Michaelmas (novel), a science fiction novel by Algis Budrys
- Michaelmas Island, an island in Western Australia
- Michaelmas term, the first term of the academic years of several United Kingdom universities

== See also ==
- Michaelmas and Upolu Cays National Park, Queensland, Australia
- Michaelmas Daisy, plants in genus Aster
- Michaelmas Term (play), a Jacobean comedy by Thomas Middleton
