= The Color Out of Time =

- Cover of the 1984 DAW Books edition
- Author: Michael Shea
- Language: English
- Publication date: 1984

The Color Out of Time is a 1984 novel written by Michael Shea. It is the unofficial sequel to H. P. Lovecraft's short story "The Colour Out of Space" and takes place about 50 years after the events of "The Colour Out of Space".

== Plot summary ==
The Color Out of Time is a novel in which a horror story is set in a flooded New England valley plagued by eerie, shimmering colors. The story follows two elderly professors and an old woman as they confront an ancient, malevolent force.

== Publication history ==
Shea previously wrote a pastiche novel in the style of Jack Vance, and wrote The Color Out of Time as an homage to H.P. Lovecraft.

== Reception ==
Wendy Graham reviewed The Color Out of Time for Adventurer magazine and stated that "It's dull, dated, and not very scary, while missing the insane sense of wonder that H P. was able to produce at his best."

== Reviews ==
- Review by Lin Carter (1984) in Crypt of Cthulhu, Michaelmas 1984
- Review by Faren Miller (1984) in Locus, #285 October 1984
- Review by Don D'Ammassa (1984) in Science Fiction Chronicle, #63 December 1984
- Review by C. J. Henderson (1984) in Whispers, December 1984
- Review by David Engrebretson (1985) in Fantasy Review, January 1985
- Review by Baird Searles (1985) in Isaac Asimov's Science Fiction Magazine, April 1985
- Review by Robert Coulson (1985) in Amazing Stories, July 1985
- Review by Terry Broome (1986) in Paperback Inferno, #63

== Bibliography ==
- Shea, Michael (1984). The Color out of Time. New York: DAW Books.
