= David Grace =

David Grace may refer to:

- David Grace (racing driver) (born 1949), British racing driver and businessman
- David Grace (basketball), American basketball coach
- David Grace (snooker player) (born 1985), English snooker player
- David Grace, pen name of American author David M. Alexander (born 1945)
