= Tomorrow Speculative Fiction =

American science fiction magazine

- First issue (January 1993); illustration by Alex Schomburg
- Editor: Algis Budrys
- First issue: January 1993
- Final issue: February 1997
- Company: Pulphouse, Unifont
- Website: Archived home page

Tomorrow Speculative Fiction was a science fiction magazine edited by Algis Budrys, published in print and online in the United States from 1993 to 1999. It was launched by Pulphouse Publishing as part of its attempt to move away from book publishing to magazines, but cash flow problems led Budrys to buy the magazine after the first issue and publish it himself. There were 24 issues as a print magazine from 1992 to 1997, mostly on a bimonthly schedule. The magazine was losing money, and in 1997 Budrys moved to online publishing, rebranding the magazine as tomorrowsf. Readership grew while the magazine was free to read on the web, but plummeted when Budrys began charging for subscriptions. In 1998 Budrys stopped acquiring new fiction, only publishing reprints of his own stories, and in 1999 he shut the magazine down.

Tomorrow published many new writers, though few of them went on to successful careers. Well-known authors who appeared in the magazine included Gene Wolfe, Ursula K. Le Guin, and Harlan Ellison. The Encyclopedia of Science Fiction lists The Mines of Behemoth, a novel by Michael Shea, and "Another Story", by Le Guin, as among the best work published in the magazine, but comments that Tomorrow was "rather less satisfying than one might have expected from Budrys: an uneven mix of the superior with the sufficient". Mark R. Kelly, a reviewer for Locus, described the stories as "workmanlike". Tomorrow was a finalist for the Hugo Award for Best Semiprozine in 1994 and 1995.

== Publishing history ==
In the late 1980s, Dean Wesley Smith and Kristine Kathryn Rusch started Pulphouse Publishing in order to issue a hardback anthology series, Pulphouse, which they described as a hardback magazine. The publishing operation grew, absorbing Axolotl Press in 1989, and using the imprint to reissue stories from Isaac Asimov's Science Fiction Magazine as well as new stories. In 1991 Pulphouse: A Weekly Magazine was launched, though it was unable to keep to a weekly schedule and appeared irregularly over the next four years. Pulphouse was having cash flow problems and was in debt: Smith believed the book publishing business was collapsing and was trying to move his publishing operations into magazines, and away from books. In 1992 he launched Pulphouse Fiction Spotlight, and in 1992 he started Tomorrow Speculative Fiction, with Algis Budrys as editor. Pulphouse announced the magazine shortly before the World Science Fiction Convention (known as Worldcon) in September 1992, quoting payment rates of three to seven cents per word, with higher rates for well-known writers and for shorter fiction. (Note: The lower end of this range met the minimum requirements for a professional sale to meet the qualifications for membership in Science Fiction and Fantasy Writers of America, the genre's professional association for authors, but would have been regarded as a low rate for that time.) The first issue was dated January 1993, but it was printed early enough to be distributed at the Worldcon.

Pulphouse's financial problems persuaded Budrys to safeguard the magazine by buying it after only one issue. The deal was completed in December 1992, and Budrys and his wife incorporated the Unifont Company as the publisher. Budrys honored the subscriptions that had been sold, but decided not to continue with national distribution, instead supplying specialist stores and selling subscriptions. At the end of 1993 circulation stood at 3,000, and it remained at about that number for the life of the print magazine.

The first issue was priced at $3.95 ($9.00 in 2024); the price was increased to $4 with the second issue. Budrys increased the page count from 64 to 80 pages with the fourth issue, in order to make room for longer stories. Production costs increased over the next four years, and although Budrys raised the price twice more, to $4.50 in June 1995 and to $5 the following April, he was unable to make the magazine profitable. Some retailers failed to pay him for issues, and he commented in 1997 that "all of my distributors lied to me ... You put out a magazine with a retail price of $5 and if you're lucky, you get back a buck. That just does not compute. So I decided to try the Web."

=== Web version ===
Initially Budrys gave the web version of Tomorrow, rebranded as tomorrowsf, issue dates on the same schedule as the print version, with issue 25 dated April 1997 and the next two issues following at bimonthly intervals. However, material was added to the website as early as January 1997, and Budrys soon switched to a weekly release schedule, with version numbers, so that, for example, the final edition of the August 1997 issue became version 3.9. The first three issues were free, and readership was substantially greater than for the print version, but when Budrys switched to requiring subscriptions, at $10 for six issues, the readership fell precipitously. With little revenue from advertising Budrys stopped including new fiction after June 1998, instead reprinting old stories of his. He returned stories he had bought and not yet published to their authors later that year. The seventeenth and last issue was dated December 1999. The website is no longer active, though some of its material is preserved in the Internet Archive.

== Contents and reception ==
The first issue of the magazine included Gene Wolfe's "Useful Phrases", and stories by Rob Chilson and Charles L. Grant. The lead story was M. Shayne Bell's "Night Games", described by a reviewer as "impressively taut". Under the pseudonym "Paul Janvier", Budrys contributed "Starlight", a short story written to suit the cover artwork, by Alex Schomburg. Under his own name Budrys printed the first in a series of nine articles about writing. The second issue included stories by Robert Reed and Geoffrey Landis, and another pseudonymous story by Budrys, again written for the cover art, which was by Paul Lehr. Other well-known writers who appeared in Tomorrow included Norman Spinrad, Avram Davidson, Harlan Ellison, and Sarah Zettel. The Encyclopedia of Science Fiction describes the fiction as "very uneven" but lists among the better stories The Mines of Behemoth, a novel in the Nifft the Lean series, by Michael Shea; "Another Story" by Ursula K. Le Guin (a reprint from Le Guin's collection A Fisherman of the Inland Sea); and work by William Barton, Élisabeth Vonarburg, R. Gárcia y Robertson, and William Esrac. Locus' reviewer, Mark R. Kelly, also singled out "Another Story", describing it as "a moving, beautiful work, certain to be one of the best stories of 1994".

Budrys had been an instructor at the Clarion Writers' Workshop and a coordinator at the Writers of the Future competition, and had enjoyed the work he had done with new writers as a result. In his editorial in the first issue, Budrys said that the magazine would have "a bit of a bias toward newer writers", and over the magazine's 24 print issues about a third of the 164 authors who appeared made either their first or second sale to Tomorrow. Many of the newer writers failed to establish themselves in the field; exceptions included Eliot Fintushel, described by the science fiction historian Mike Ashley as "perhaps the real discovery of Tomorrow", and Michael H. Payne. Ashley comments that the work of the many new writers often appeared mechanical, "as if they were following Budrys's guidelines and learning as they went ... few could sustain it, which is why so few of Tomorrow's discoveries sold beyond the magazine". Halfway through the magazine's run, Kelly described Tomorrow as valuing "workmanlike tales of traditional story values" more than "originality of ideas or personality of style". Kelly considered that Tomorrow often printed stories that "conform to editor Budrys's ... guideline for story structure, but at the same time exhibit no trace of concern for general conceptual plausibility".

When Tomorrow became an online magazine, Budrys added a column by Thomas Easton, book reviews, interviews, and a letter column. Writers who contributed to the web version of the magazine included Rob Chilson and Sheila Finch. Kelly reviewed an early version of the website, describing it as a "handsome, still-growing site [that] features stories, articles, editorials, art, and even little snippets of music that play as you pass your mouse over the story titles on the table of contents". Richard Chwedyk's "The Measure of All Things" was one of the manuscripts that Budrys had acquired but returned to the author in 1998, when he stopped printing new material; in revised form Chwedyk sold it to The Magazine of Fantasy & Science Fiction. It won a Nebula Award, and was a finalist for the Hugo Award.

Tomorrow was a finalist for the Hugo Award for Best Semiprozine in both 1994 and 1995, losing to Science Fiction Chronicle in 1994 and to Interzone the following year. The Encyclopedia of Science Fiction summarizes the magazine as "rather less satisfying than one might have expected from Budrys: an uneven mix of the superior with the sufficient".

== Bibliographic details ==
	Jan	Feb	Mar	Apr	May	Jun	Jul	Aug	Sep	Oct	Nov	Dec
1993	1/1			1/2			1/3	1/4		1/5		1/6
1994		2/1		2/2		2/3		2/4		2/5		2/6
1995		3/1		3/2		3/3		3/4		3/5		3/6
1996		4/1		4/2		4/3		4/4			4/5	
1997		4/6										
Print issues of Tomorrow showing volume and issue number. Algis Budrys was editor throughout.

Budrys was Tomorrow's editor throughout the magazine's run. The publisher was Pulphouse Publishing for the first issue, and Budrys's Unifont Company thereafter. There were four volumes of six issues each: the schedule was bimonthly, with some exceptions—for example, the second issue was delayed a month as Budrys completed the purchase of the magazine from Pulphouse. The schedule returned to bimonthly after the fourth issue, and this lasted until the final two print issues, which were on a quarterly schedule.

Budrys' essays on writing which had appeared in nine of the first ten issues were assembled along with other material into Writing to the Point: A Complete Guide to Selling Fiction in 1994. The Encyclopedia of Science Fiction describes the book as demonstrating Budrys' "shrewd sense of genre".

== Sources ==
- Anonymous (September 1992). "Tomorrow at Worldcon". Locus. Vol. 29, no. 3. p. 7. ISSN 0047-4959.
- Anonymous (May 1993). "Magazine News". Locus. Vol. 30, no. 5. p. 70. ISSN 0047-4959.
- Anonymous (November 1997). "Magazine News". Locus. Vol. 39, no. 5. p. 75. ISSN 0047-4959.
- Ashley, Mike (2016). Science Fiction Rebels: The Story of the Science-Fiction Magazines from 1981 to 1990. Liverpool: Liverpool University Press. ISBN 978-1-78138-260-8.
- Ashley, Mike (2022). The Rise of the Cyberzines: The Story of the Science-Fiction Magazines from 1991 to 2020. Liverpool: Liverpool University Press. ISBN 978-1-80085-648-6.
- Budrys, Algis (January 1993a). "Masthead". Tomorrow Speculative Fiction. Vol. 1, no. 1. p. 1. ISSN 1072-4990.
- Budrys, Algis (January 1993b). "Editorial". Tomorrow Speculative Fiction. Vol. 1, no. 1. p. 2. ISSN 1072-4990.
- Kelly, Mark R. (November 1992). "Distillations: Short Fiction". Locus. Vol. 29, no. 5. pp. 13–15, 59. ISSN 0047-4959.
- Kelly, Mark R. (September 1994). "Distillations: Short Fiction". Locus. Vol. 33, no. 3. pp. 15–17, 65–66. ISSN 0047-4959.
- Kelly, Mark R. (January 1995). "Distillations: Short Fiction". Locus. Vol. 34, no. 1. pp. 15–17, 54. ISSN 0047-4959.
- Kelly, Mark R. (June 1995). "Distillations: Short Fiction". Locus. Vol. 34, no. 6. pp. 13–15, 55–56. ISSN 0047-4959.
- Kelly, Mark R. (April 1997). "Distillations: Short Fiction". Locus. Vol. 38, no. 4. pp. 13–15, 42–44. ISSN 0047-4959.

== See also ==
- Speculative fiction
