= Napoleon Disentimed =

1987 novel by Hayford Peirce

- The Russian edition of Napoleon Disentimed, 1997
- Author: Hayford Peirce
- Language: English
- Genre: Science fiction
- Publisher: Tor Books
- Publication date: 1987
- Publication place: United States

Napoleon Disentimed is a science fiction novel by American writer Hayford Peirce, first published by Tor Books in 1987. It is a humorous treatment of two standard science fiction themes, those of time travel and of parallel universes. The protagonist is a dapper, clever con man who, although born to humble origins in Bangor, Maine, United States, calls himself Sir Kevin Dean de Courtney MacNair of MacNair. Part of it is set in two alternate universes to our own. In one of them, Napoleon won the Napoleonic Wars and subdued Great Britain and Russia in 1806, thereafter securing global dominance for him and his descendants- a Napoleon V still sits on his world's French imperial throne in its 1980s. In another, the British royal family made different dynastic arrangements, leading to the birth of a male heir to King William IV rather than Queen Victoria, Frederick I, whose descendants still rule the United Kingdom- Frederick IV is the reigning monarch in its 1987. Through a complicated series of misadventures MacNair ends up impersonating Napoleon Bonaparte for the dictator's so-called "Missing Years", 1806–1808. By the end of the book he has succeeded in not only acquiring a beautiful wife and a slightly run-down château in France but in also inventing both the modern indoor flush toilet and Champagne. A sequel to Napoleon Disentimed, also featuring the MacNair, is The Burr in the Garden of Eden.
