= Strange People, Queer Notions =

1958 novel by John Holbrook Vance

- Author: Jack Vance
- Language: English
- Publication date: 1958

Strange People, Queer Notions is a 1958 novel by American writer Jack Vance, writing as John Holbrook Vance. It was republished in the 2002 Vance Integral Edition (VIE).

== Plot introduction ==
A young Oregonian art student is hired by another American to housesit a villa in a small Italian village. The employer then leads various members of the expatriate community in the village to believe the young man is a blackmailer.
