= Nobody Bothers Gus =

1955 short story by Algis Budrys

"Nobody Bothers Gus" is a 1955 science fiction short story by American writer Algis Budrys. It was first published in Astounding Science-Fiction.

There were two sequel stories: "The Peasant Girl" (1956), and "And Then She Found Him" (1957).

== Synopsis ==
Gus Kusevic has astounding mutant powers, but cannot have any effect on the world, because one of his powers is being superhumanly unmemorable.

== Reception ==
"Nobody Bothers Gus" was a finalist for the 1956 Hugo Award for Best Short Story. The Independent, in Budrys' 2008 obituary, noted that the story "remains intensely readable", while The Times called it "exceptional".
