= A Quest for Simbilis =

1974 novel by Michael Shea

- First edition (publ. DAW Books); Cover artist: George Barr
- Author: Michael Shea
- Publisher: DAW Books
- Publication date: January 1, 1974
- ISBN: 978-0-879-97092-5

A Quest for Simbilis is a novel by Michael Shea published in 1974.

== Plot summary ==
A Quest for Simbilis is a novel in which the plot is a sequel to Jack Vance's The Eyes of the Overworld (which has also been published as Cugel the Clever).

== Reception ==
Dave Langford reviewed A Quest for Simbilis for White Dwarf #74, and stated that "Vance can be relied on for unwavering polish, but tends to recycle old plot elements; Shea, though more rough-hewn, adds innovations plus a touch of true, murky hellfire from an imagination fuelled by Hieronymus Bosch."

== Reviews ==
- Review by Dave Bischoff (1974) in Thrust, #5 1974
- Review by L. Sprague de Camp (1974) in Amra V2n62, October 1974
- Review by Lin Carter (1975) in The Year's Best Fantasy Stories
- Review by Chris Marler (1975) in Astral Dimensions #2, Winter 1975-1976
- Review [German] by Hermann Urbanek [as by H. Urbanek] (1977) in Er kam aus der Sonne
