= The Flesh Mask =

Novel by Jack Vance

- First edition (original title) (publ. Mystery House)
- Author: Jack Vance
- Language: English
- Publication date: 1957

The Flesh Mask is a novel by American author Jack Vance.

Originally published in 1957 under the pseudonym Peter Held as Take My Face, it was republished credited to Jack Vance in 1988 by Underwood-Miller as Take My Face and as The Flesh Mask, the author's preferred title, in the 2002 Vance Integral Edition.

== Plot summary ==
Taunted by four of the school's prettiest girls at a high school party, a star athlete with a severely disfigured face lashes out at one of them in his drunken frustration. Sent to reform school for assault, the boy undergoes extensive facial reconstructive surgery at state expense. Years later, the girls are in college when one of them is murdered, her face mutilated, and the others receive threats. The young man's whereabouts are unknown and it is learned there is no photographic record of his new face.
