= Guillermo del Toro's Cabinet of Curiosities =

Horror anthology streaming television series

- Title card
- Genre: Horror; Dark fantasy
- Created by: Guillermo del Toro
- Based on: Cabinet of Curiosities by Guillermo del Toro
- Presented by: Guillermo del Toro
- Theme music composer: Holly Amber Church
- Countries of origin: United States; Mexico
- Original language: English
- No. of seasons: 1
- No. of episodes: 8

Production
- Executive producers: Guillermo del Toro; J. Miles Dale; Gary Ungar
- Producer: Jeff Authors
- Production location: Toronto
- Cinematography: Colin Hoult; Jeremy Benning; Michael Ragan; Anastas Michos
- Editors: Ben Wilkinson; Marc Roussel; Cam Wilkinson; Michele Conroy
- Running time: 38–64 minutes
- Production companies: Exile Entertainment; Double Dare You; De Milo Films

Original release
- Network: Netflix
- Release: October 25 – October 28, 2022

Guillermo del Toro's Cabinet of Curiosities (or simply Cabinet of Curiosities) is a horror anthology television miniseries created by Guillermo del Toro for Netflix. It features eight modern horror stories in the traditions of the Gothic and Grand Guignol genres. Two are co-written by del Toro himself, while the others are written and directed by various filmmakers.

Guillermo del Toro's Cabinet of Curiosities premiered on October 25, 2022. The series received generally positive reviews from critics, with praise for its directing, performances of the cast, production values, and special effects, but some criticism for its pacing and some writing aspects.

== Premise ==
The series is "a collection of the Oscar-winning filmmaker's personally curated stories, described as [equally] sophisticated and horrific". Del Toro introduces each episode. Del Toro credits Rod Serling's Night Gallery as one of the inspirations for his Cabinet of Curiosities, specifically in the manner with which Serling opens and closes each episode. He told an interviewer, "I have incredibly vivid memories of the series, of the fear that enveloped me when I watched each episode: the fantastic opening featuring those wide-angle faces, distorted and grimacing; Gil Mellé's incredible music that created feelings of both fear and excitement; and Rod Serling's carefully phrased introductions of Tom Wright's horrific and dread-filled paintings that haunt my imagination to this day."

The central conceit of the series is the opening of a cabinet of curiosities one section at a time, each episode corresponding to a different curiosity from the cabinet.

== Production ==
=== Development ===
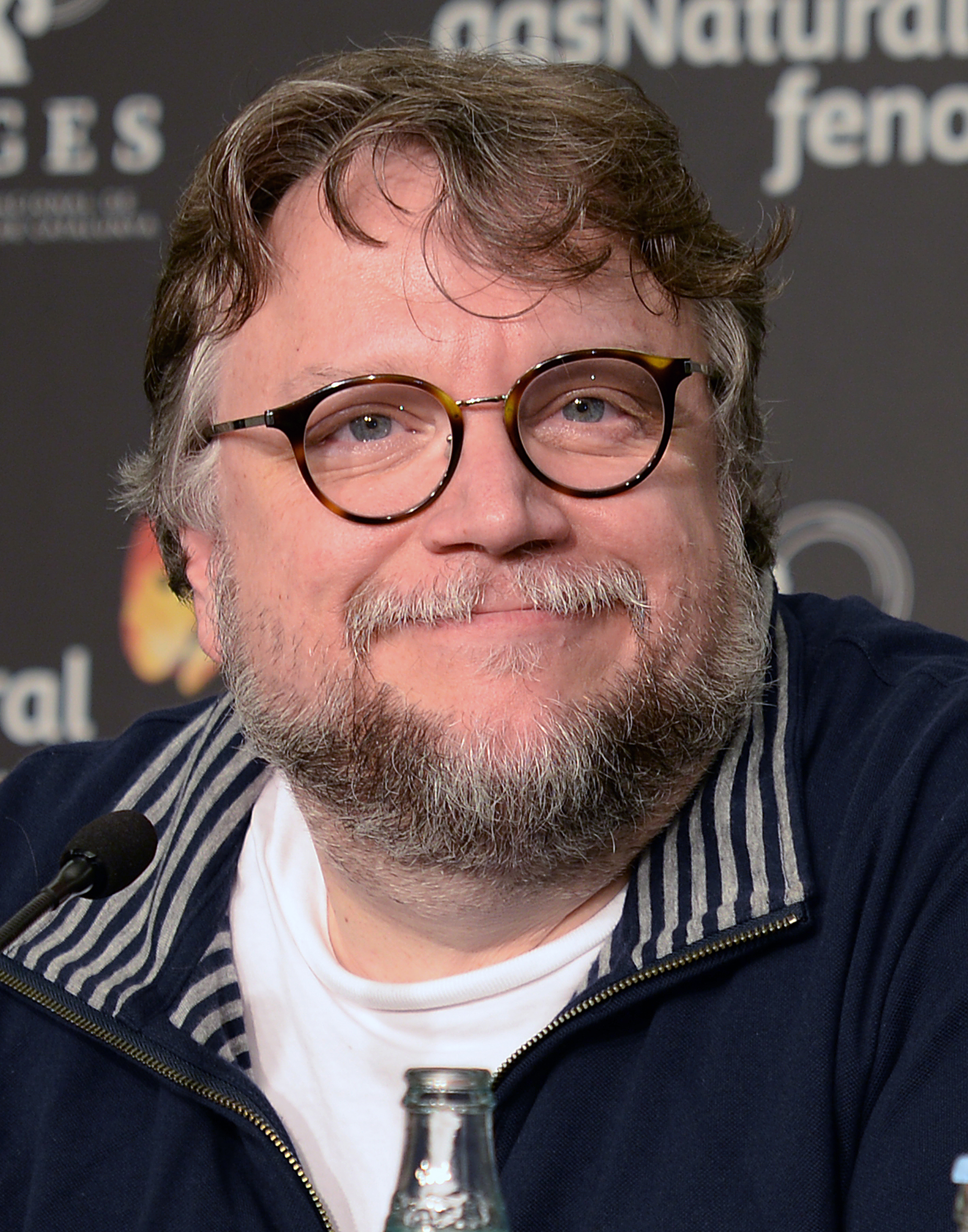
Guillermo del Toro

On May 14, 2018, it was announced that Netflix had given the production a series order. Executive producers included Guillermo del Toro, J. Miles Dale, and Gary Ungar. Del Toro also served as writer for one episode and handpicked other writers and directors to helm other episodes.

In September 2021, The Hollywood Reporter announced that The Babadook filmmaker Jennifer Kent would write and direct an episode starring the film's lead Essie Davis. The season would consist of seven other episodes, to be directed individually by Ana Lily Amirpour, Panos Cosmatos, Catherine Hardwicke, Guillermo Navarro, David Prior, Vincenzo Natali, and Keith Thomas, with writers such as Regina Corrado, Lee Patterson, Haley Z. Boston, Mika Watkins, and Aaron Stewart-Ahn. The series was described as "in production", according to The Hollywood Reporter.

=== Filming ===
Principal photography of the series began under the working title Guillermo del Toro Presents: After Midnight on June 28, 2021, in Toronto and Hamilton, Ontario, Canada, and concluded on February 16, 2022.

== Episodes ==
No.	Title	Directed by	Written by	Original release date
1	"Lot 36"	Guillermo Navarro	Teleplay by : Regina Corrado and Guillermo del Toro; Based on the short story by : Guillermo del Toro (Note: "Lot 36" and "The Murmuring" are based on unpublished original stories written by del Toro for this series.)	October 25, 2022
In 1991, xenophobic, right-wing veteran Nick purchases the rights to a late old man's abandoned storage room lot. He refuses Mexican immigrant Amelia's pleas to let her recover her familial belongings from her lot, which was mistakenly sold to him. Desperate for funds to pay a debt, he searches for valuable items. He finds an Austrian séance table and three volumes on demon summoning. A broker contacts a buyer, Roland, who urges him to find the rare fourth volume. While searching the lot, they find a secret chamber that contains the fourth volume and a dormant demon, summoned and sealed into the desiccated body of the old man's long-missing sister Dottie Wolmar. Ignoring Roland's warnings, Nick breaks the mystical seal trapping the demon while retrieving the book. The demon emerges as a writhing tentacled mass, consumes Roland, and chases Nick through the dark warehouse. Finding the exit locked and Amelia outside, Nick begs her to help him, but she leaves him to be consumed by the demon. Cast: Tim Blake Nelson, Sebastian Roché, Demetrius Grosse, Elpidia Carrillo
2	"Graveyard Rats"	Vincenzo Natali	Teleplay by : Vincenzo Natali; Based on the short story by : Henry Kuttner	October 25, 2022
In interwar Salem, Massachusetts, Masson is a grave robber in desperate need of funds. His attempts have been thwarted by terrifying rats, who rapidly swarm and remove any valuables held by recently buried corpses. When his financial situation becomes dire, he learns of a recently buried aristocrat and attempts to unearth him and his valuables. Masson unearths the coffin to find the rats have already dug to the coffin and dragged the corpse underground. Crawling in after them, he encounters an enormous queen rat who chases him through their warren. He falls into a hole and lands in a subterranean temple filled with skeletons and riches. He steals a talisman from a corpse, which animates and chases after him demanding its return. Crawling back through the tunnels, he accidentally causes a cave-in that kills the queen rat and traps the corpse in debris. Climbing toward a light above that he believes to be the moon, he finds to his horror that it is the glint of a coffin lid's plaque. Trapped inside and buried alive, he is swarmed by rats. Later, other grave robbers unearth his corpse, adorned with the treasures he took from the shrine. From his body emerge numerous rats. Cast: David Hewlett, Julian Richings, Nabeel El Khafif
3	"The Autopsy"	David Prior	Teleplay by : David S. Goyer; Based on the short story by : Michael Shea	October 26, 2022
In 1978, Sheriff Nate Craven asks friend Dr. Carl Winters to perform autopsies on several dead miners. One of them, Joe Allen, caused an explosion while carrying a mysterious object. As Winters records his autopsies, Allen's body reanimates, revealing that it is inhabited by an alien parasite. Allen encountered the parasite by chance and unsuccessfully attempted to destroy it. The parasites have no sensory organs and use their hosts for pleasure and nourishment. They revel in stimulating their host's senses to extremes and keeping the host conscious as it consumes them from within. Sensing Winters's cancer, it subdues him and plans to parasitize him, using his cancer as a replenishing food source. It cuts itself out of Allen's body, temporarily senseless. As it burrows into Winters's body, Winters grabs Allen's scalpel, gouges out his eyes, punctures his eardrums, writes a message on his chest in blood, and cuts his throat. Inside their shared mind, Winters reveals to the parasite that he has trapped it in his senseless, dying body and that its words have been recorded, to the parasite's agony. The message on his chest instructs Craven to listen to his recordings, which captured the conversation, and burn his body. Cast: F. Murray Abraham, Glynn Turman, Luke Roberts
4	"The Outside"	Ana Lily Amirpour	Teleplay by : Haley Z. Boston; Based on a webcomic by : E. M. Carroll (Note: "The Outside" is based on E. M. Carroll's webcomic "Some Other Animal's Meat".)	October 26, 2022
Stacey, an awkward, unattractive woman, longs to be accepted and beautiful like the women in her workplace. After being invited to her coworker's Christmas party, Stacey is given a popular skincare lotion called Alo Glo, while her taxidermy Secret Santa gift is poorly received. Despondent, she tries the lotion and develops a rash. At home, her husband fails to reassure her that she is perfect just the way she is. After receiving a direct message from the creator of the lotion through her TV, she agrees to buy more Alo Glo. The lotion leaks from the bottles, forming a humanoid that Stacey embraces and kisses, before it discorporates into her bathtub. When her husband tries to shake her from her obsession, she murders him. Climbing into the lotion bath, she scratches off her rashed skin to reveal her new, perfect body. She taxidermies her husband, gives herself a makeover, and arrives to work, stunning her coworkers, who invite her to join them. Having finally lost herself, Stacey revels in her coworkers' attention and new shallow social status. Cast: Kate Micucci, Martin Starr, Dan Stevens
5	"Pickman's Model"	Keith Thomas	Teleplay by : Lee Patterson; Based on the short story by : H. P. Lovecraft	October 27, 2022
In 1909, art student Will Thurber from Arkham becomes friends with Richard Pickman, whose horrific works of art mesmerize him. Seventeen years later, Thurber, now a museum curator, remains enthralled but disturbed by Pickman's works, suffering horrific dreams. Pickman, now a successful artist, visits Thurber; his wife, Rebecca; and young son, James. When James also has terrifying dreams after seeing Pickman's work, Thurber confronts Pickman. Pickman begs him to come to his home and see his works. Thurber lights the works on fire and accidentally shoots Pickman, who says the works were not based on imagination, but real life and scenes of the future. A demon depicted in one of the paintings emerges and drags Pickman's corpse away. The next day, Thurber is horrified to find his museum displaying Pickman's works, completely undamaged, and that James and Rebecca have viewed them. He sends the two home and orders the paintings destroyed. Returning home, he talks to Rebecca, promising that he will be a better husband, but discovers that the paintings have driven Rebecca mad. She has gouged out her eyes and butchered and cooked their son, as depicted in one of Pickman's paintings. Cast: Ben Barnes, Crispin Glover, Oriana Leman
6	"Dreams in the Witch House"	Catherine Hardwicke	Teleplay by : Mika Watkins; Based on the short story by : H. P. Lovecraft	October 27, 2022
As a child, following the death of his ailing twin sister Epperley, Walter Gilman witnesses her spirit being dragged away to an otherworldly forest. As a grown man in 1933, he's a member of the Spiritualist Society who seeks to cross into the other side in hopes of saving Epperley. He rents a room in the house of an executed witch, Keziah Mason, and takes an Indigenous drug named Liquid Gold designed to take him to the Forest of Lost Souls. After several attempts, he locates his sister and brings a piece of her dress into the real world with him. His attempts gain the attention of the spirit of Keziah and her familiar, a human-faced rat, Jenkins Brown. When Walter successfully brings Epperley back, they learn that Keziah and Jenkins have also come back, and that Walter must die before dawn to bring one of them back permanently. Keziah attempts to kill Walter, but Epperley kills her and peacefully dies herself. However, Jenkins takes advantage of the situation and burrows into Walter's body, bursting forth and killing him just before dawn. He burrows back into Walter's body and triumphantly possesses him. Cast: Rupert Grint, Ismael Cruz Córdova, DJ Qualls, Nia Vardalos, Tenika Davis, Gaby Moreno
7	"The Viewing"	Panos Cosmatos	Panos Cosmatos and Aaron Stewart-Ahn (Note: "The Viewing" is not an adaptation of an existing story.)	October 28, 2022
In 1979, wealthy recluse Lionel Lassiter invites musician Randall Roth, astrophysicist Charlotte Xie (who studies extraterrestrial life), best-selling author Guy Landon, and psychic Targ Reinhhard to his home for a special viewing, intended to help them all expand their consciousness. Flanked by his physician Dr. Zahra, he encourages them all to take a mixture of cocaine and a custom drug made by Zahra, to place them on the same wavelength. He takes them to a secret room containing an otherworldly meteor. The meteor reacts to their collective presence, and they fall into a trance. The meteor cracks open, and an oozing entity emerges. The power emanating from the being melts Targ's face and Zahra's body, explodes Landon's head, and causes Xie and Roth to flee for their lives. The entity melts down and possesses Lassiter's body, stalking the grounds of his home and killing his guard with electricity. Xie and Roth flee by car, stopping eventually to question what occurred. The entity, now merged with Lassiter into a grisly form, enters the sewers, disrupting the electricity of the city with its uncontrolled aura. Cast: Peter Weller, Eric André, Sofia Boutella, Lo Mutuc, (Note: Credited as Charlyne Yi) Steve Agee, Michael Therriault, Saad Siddiqui
8	"The Murmuring"	Jennifer Kent	Teleplay by : Jennifer Kent; Based on the short story by : Guillermo del Toro	October 28, 2022
In 1951, Nancy and Edgar Bradley are ornithologists studying bird murmurations. After their daughter Ava dies, they go to a remote country home to continue their studies and get away from their grief. Nancy sees ghostly apparitions of a crying boy and a screaming angry woman. Edgar believes these visions are from the strain of her grief. Nancy learns that the former owner, Claudette, drowned her son and committed suicide after her husband left her for another woman. During a fight over these visions, Edgar expresses frustration over Nancy never crying following Ava's death, nor wishing to talk about it, and his hopelessness over their strained relationship. Despondent, he leaves for his research site the next morning. Alone, Nancy is chased by Claudette's screaming ghost and hears her son crying that his mother is angry with him. Comforting him, Nancy encourages him to run into the light. He does and disappears. Nancy witnesses Claudette throw herself off a balcony, realizing that her angry screams were in anguish over drowning her son. Claudette's spirit is carried by an enormous bird murmuration, which envelops Nancy, allowing her to finally cry and confront her grief. When Edgar returns, Nancy says she is finally ready to talk about Ava, to his relief. Cast: Essie Davis, Andrew Lincoln, Hannah Galway

== Reception ==
The review aggregator website Rotten Tomatoes reports that 93% of 56 surveyed critics gave the series a positive review; the average rating is 7.6/10. The website's critics consensus reads, "Horror maestro Guillermo del Toro lends his household name to a collection of spooky tales directed by genre veterans and promising newcomers – with each curious trinket adding up to a treasure trove of gothic storytelling". Metacritic, which uses a weighted average, assigned a score of 72 out of 100 based on 21 critics, indicating "generally favorable reviews".

=== Accolades ===
Year	Ceremony	Category	Recipient(s)	Result	Ref.
2023	American Society of Cinematographers Awards	Outstanding Achievement in Cinematography in Motion Picture, Miniseries, or Pilot Made for Television	Jeremy Benning (for "The Outside")	Nominated	
2023	American Society of Cinematographers Awards	Outstanding Achievement in Cinematography in Motion Picture, Miniseries, or Pilot Made for Television	Anastas Michos (for "The Autopsy")	Nominated	
2023	Art Directors Guild Awards	Excellence in Production Design for a Television Movie or Limited Series	Tamara Deverell	Won	
2023	Cinema Audio Society Awards	Outstanding Achievement in Sound Mixing for a Non-Theatrical Motion Pictures or Limited Series	Rob Beal, Paul Shubat, Michael Woroniuk (for "The Autopsy")	Nominated	
2023	Make-Up Artists and Hair Stylists Guild Awards	Best Special Make-Up Effects in a Television Series, Television Limited or Miniseries or Television New Media Series	Sean Sansom, Mike Hill	Nominated	
2023	Visual Effects Society Awards	Outstanding Effects Simulations in an Episode, Commercial, or Real-Time Project	Amit Khanna, Oleg Memukhin, Mario Marengo, Josh George (for "Graveyard Rats")	Nominated	
2023	Hollywood Critics Association TV Awards	Best Streaming Limited or Anthology Series	Guillermo del Toro's Cabinet of Curiosities	Nominated	
2023	Primetime Creative Arts Emmy Awards	Outstanding Cinematography for a Limited or Anthology Series or Movie	Anastas Michos (for "The Autopsy")	Nominated	
2023	Primetime Creative Arts Emmy Awards	Outstanding Period Costumes for a Limited or Anthology Series or Movie	Luis Sequeira, Ann Steel, Heather Crepp (for "Dreams in the Witch House")	Nominated	
2023	Primetime Creative Arts Emmy Awards	Outstanding Main Title Design	Mike Schaeffer, Chet Hirsch, David Rowley, Akshay Tiwari	Nominated	
2023	Primetime Creative Arts Emmy Awards	Outstanding Makeup for a Variety, Nonfiction or Reality Program	Sean Sanson, Shane Zander, Kyle Glencross, Mike Hill, Megan Many (for "Dreams in the Witch House")	Nominated	
2023	Primetime Creative Arts Emmy Awards	Outstanding Original Main Title Theme Music	Holly Amber Church	Nominated	
2023	Primetime Creative Arts Emmy Awards	Outstanding Production Design for a Narrative Period or Fantasy Program (One Hour or More)	Tamara Deverell, Brandt Gordon, and Shane Vieau	Won	
2023	Primetime Creative Arts Emmy Awards	Outstanding Sound Editing for a Limited or Anthology Series, Movie or Special	Nelson Ferreira, Jill Purdy, Paul Davies, Bernard O’Reilly, Paul Germann, Tom Jenkins, Robert Hegedus, Rose Gregoris, Goro Koyama (for "The Autopsy")	Nominated	
2024	Canadian Screen Music Awards	Best Original Score for a Dramatic Series or Special	Jeff Danna	Nominated	
2024	Saturn Awards	Best Television Presentation	Guillermo del Toro's Cabinet of Curiosities	Nominated	
