= The Deadly Isles =

1969 novel by Jack Vance

- First edition
- Author: Jack Vance
- Language: English
- Publisher: Bobbs-Merrill
- Publication date: 1969
- Dewey Decimal: 813.54
- LC Class: PZ4.V2215 De

The Deadly Isles is a novel by American author Jack Vance published in 1969 by Bobbs-Merrill and as part of the 2002 Vance Integral Edition.

== Plot introduction ==
A young scientist with family ties to a vast fortune survives a murder attempt by a stranger while working in French Tahiti, and allows the assailant and the police to believe the attempt was successful. Incognito, he follows the would-be murderer aboard an island-hopping passenger/cargo schooner bound for the Marquesas, intending to find the man out.
