= Michael Shea (American author) =

American fiction author (1946–2014)

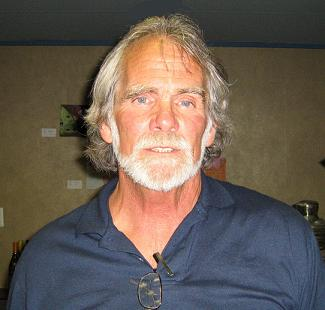
- Born: July 3, 1946; Los Angeles, California, U.S.
- Died: February 16, 2014 (aged 67)
- Education: University of California, Los Angeles; University of California, Berkeley
- Occupation: Author
- Writing career
- Genres: Science fiction, fantasy, horror
- Website: michaelsheaauthor.com

Michael Shea (July 3, 1946 – February 16, 2014) was an American fantasy, horror, and science fiction author. His novel Nifft the Lean won the World Fantasy Award, as did his novella Growlimb.

== Life and work ==
Shea was born to Irish parents in Los Angeles in 1946. There he frequented Venice Beach and the Baldwin Hills for their wildlife. He attended UCLA and Berkeley and hitch-hiked twice across the US and Canada. At a hotel in Juneau, Alaska, Shea chanced on a battered book from the lobby shelves, The Eyes of the Overworld by Jack Vance (1966). Four years later, after a brief first marriage and one year hitch-hiking through France and Spain, he wrote a novel in homage to Vance, who graciously declined to share the advance offered by DAW Books. It was Shea's first publication, A Quest for Simbilis (1974), and an authorized sequel to Vance's two Dying Earth books then extant. ISFDB notes that it "became non-canonic" in 1983 when Vance "continued ... The Eyes ... in a different direction."

Subsequently, Shea ranged all over the L.A. Basin, painting houses and teaching English as a second language to adults by night. In 1978 he met his second wife, artist and author Lynn Cesar. They had two children: Adele and Jacob. Shea moved to the Bay Area where (prior to 1987) he held a variety of occupations, including instructor of languages, construction laborer, and night clerk in a Mission District flophouse.

In 1979 Shea published the story "The Angel of Death" (Magazine of Fantasy and Science Fiction, Aug 1979). This was followed in 1980 by "The Autopsy" (Magazine of Fantasy and Science Fiction, Dec 1980), a story nominated for both the Hugo Award and Nebula Award.

His next published work was the novella "Polyphemus" (Magazine of Fantasy and Science Fiction, Aug 1981). His story "The Frog" appeared in The Magazine of Fantasy and Science Fiction (Apr 1982). Shea was quiet for a few years but re-emerged with his second book, a collection of four linked novellas called Nifft the Lean (1982). Nifft showed that Shea had developed the exotic style of Vance and Clark Ashton Smith, plus the ingenuity of Fritz Leiber's Gray Mouser stories, to produce an extravagant quest novel. It won the 1983 World Fantasy Award as year's best novel.

Shea followed up with The Color out of Time (1984), a work influenced by the Cthulhu Mythos, and In Yana, the Touch of Undying (1985), about a vain opportunist's search for immortality in a land of fable. Polyphemus (1987) is a collection of deft science fiction and horror stories published by Arkham House.

Shea continued the adventures of Nifft in The Mines of Behemoth (Baen, 1997), serialised one year earlier in the Algis Budrys magazine Tomorrow Speculative Fiction, and in a novel The A'rak (2000). The Nifft stories are "sword-and-sorcery" modeled on Jack Vance, notable for their imaginative depiction of the world of demons and their blend of horror, flowery diction, and occasionally crude humor.

Shea's work overlaps the science fiction and fantasy genres, e.g., thematic use of demons and aliens that act as endoparasites. Shea's interest in Lovecraft's Cthulhu Mythos continued throughout his career. Copping Squid and Other Mythos Tales (2010) is a collection of such tales.

Shea died unexpectedly on February 16, 2014.

== Reception ==
In an overview of Shea's work, Chris Gilmore praised Shea's fiction, stating "Shea has a racy line in grue and writes with energy, imagination and precision", and expressed particular admiration for the stories in Polyphemus. However, Gilmore also took issue with Shea's use of gigantic monsters in books such as A Quest for Simbilis and Nifft the Lean, arguing that the use of such creatures vitiated Shea's ability to describe scenes in detail. Gilmore also criticised Shea's story "The Pearls of the Vampire Queen" as being excessively violent, arguing that its protagonists kill one person and seriously injure another when the story did not require them to perform such actions.

Reviewing The Incomplete Nifft, Elizabeth Hand declared that "not even Bosch could capture the sheer, obsessive teemingness of Shea's world. . . . In their picaresque and unrelenting strangeness, Shea's tales evoke Jack Vance and Lord Dunsany, Clark Ashton Smith's Zothique tales, as well as The Worm Ouroboros; but what his work most reminds me of is David Lindsay's A Voyage to Arcturus, a book which had always struck me as being sui generis. Having read and delighted in The Incompleat Nifft, I must create a new category for this beautiful, terrifying work, part sword-and-sorcery, part season in hell. Call it Shea generis."

On his list of "The 13 Most Terrifying Horror Stories", T. E. D. Klein placed Shea's story "The Autopsy" at number eleven.

== Adaptations ==
On 26 October 2022, a dramatization of “The Autopsy” streamed on Netflix as the third episode of Guillermo del Toro's Cabinet of Curiosities.

== Bibliography ==
WorldCat contributing libraries report French editions of A Quest for Simbilis and Nifft the Lean and German editions of several books.

=== Dying Earth ===
Shea's first publication was an authorized contribution to the Dying Earth series by Jack Vance

- A Quest for Simbilis (1974, OCLC 2128177)

=== Nifft ===
- Nifft the Lean (DAW, 1982, ISBN 0-87997-783-3)
- The Mines of Behemoth (Baen, 1997, ISBN 0-671-87847-6)
- The A'rak (Baen, 2000, ISBN 0-671-31947-7)

Several months before publishing the third book, Baen Books re-issued the first two in one volume, The Incompleat Nifft (Baen, 2000, ISBN 0-671-57869-3). The three Baen titles used matching cover art by Gary Ruddell with differences in jacket design.

In 1994 Darkside Press published a limited edition of Nifft the Lean with a very long subtitle in "440 signed, numbered copies, bound in 'demon-skin'" (ISBN 0-940841-39-8). (Note: Title: Nifft the lean: being the works, days, and deeds of thief Nifft of Karkmahn-Ra, as collated, prefaced and improved with exegesis & scholia by Shag Margold, geographer, a scholar native, with Nifft, to Pardash in the Ephesion Chain, his learning honored thru the four seas • With credited prologue by Tim Powers, illustration by Alan M. Clark, and map by Linda Cecere. • Statement of Limitation: "Four-hundred and forty copies of Nifft the lean have been bound in demon-skin and numbered. Four-hundred will be offered for sale." • Source: WorldCat)

=== Other novels ===
- The Color Out of Time (1984)
- In Yana, the Touch of Undying (1985)
- I, Said the Fly (Silver Salamander Press, 1993) —limited edition of 300 copies
- The Extra (2010) — based on Shea's short story of the same title, intended as the first of a trilogy
- Assault on Sunrise (2013)
- Mr. Cannyharme (2021)

=== Collections ===
- Polyphemus (1987)
- The Autopsy and Other Tales (Centipede Press, 2008) —including the complete Lovecraftian novel The Color Out of Time
- Copping Squid and Other Mythos Tales (Perilous Press, 2010), series editor S. T. Joshi
- Demiurge: The Complete Cthulhu Mythos Tales of Michael Shea (Dark Regions Press, 2017), editor S. T. Joshi
- The Autopsy: Best Weird Stories of Michael Shea (Hippocampus Press, 2022), editors Linda Shea and S. T. Joshi

=== Chapterbooks ===
- Fat Face (1987)

=== Short fiction ===
- "The Angel of Death" (1979)
- "The Autopsy" (1980), adapted for Guillermo del Toro's Cabinet of Curiosities (2022)
- "Polyphemus" (1981)
- "Nemo Me Impune Lacessit" (1982)
- "That Frog" (1982)
- "The Horror on the #33" (1982)
- "The Fishing of the Demon-Sea" (1982)
- "Come Then, Mortal, We Will Seek Her Soul" (1982)
- "The Goddess in Glass" (1982)
- "The Pearls of the Vampire Queen" (1982)
- "Shag Margold's Eulogy of Nifft the Lean, His Dear Friend" (1982)
- "Grunt-12 Test Drive" (1983)
- "Creative Coverage, Inc." (1983)
- "Uncle Tuggs" (1986)
- "Fill It With Regular" (1986)
- "The Extra" (1987)
- "Fat Face" (1987)
- "Delivery" (1987)
- "I, Said the Fly" (1989)
- "Salome" (1994)
- "Tollbooth" (1995)
- "Johnny Crack" (1995)
- "Fast Food" (1995)
- "Piece A' Chain" (1996)
- "Water of Life" (1999)
- "For Every Tatter in Its Mortal Dress" (2000)
- "The Rebuke" (2002)
- "The Growlimb" (2004) —World Fantasy Award, Best Novella
- "The Pool" (2007)
- "Tsathoggua" (2008)
- "The Battery"
- "The Presentation"
- "Copping Squid"
- "Dagoniad"

=== Reviews ===
- "Reprisal by Mitchell Smith" (2005)

== Awards ==
Shea has won major "year's best" awards, both conferred by the World Fantasy Convention and selected by open nominations and panel of judges.

- 1983 World Fantasy Award, Novel (Nifft the Lean)
- 2005 World Fantasy Award, Novella (The Growlimb)

His works have also been highly ranked, or one of a few finalists or nominees, for several other major awards.

- 1975 British Fantasy Award for Best Novel, British Fantasy Society (A Quest for Simbilis)
- 1980 Nebula Award, Novelette (The Angel of Death)
- 1981 Hugo Award, Novelette (The Autopsy)
- 1981 Locus Award, Novella, fourth place (The Autopsy)
- 1981 Nebula Award, Novella (The Autopsy)
- 1988 World Fantasy Award, Collection (Polyphemus)
- 2005 International Horror Guild Award, Mid-Length Fiction (The Growlimb)
