= Hayford Peirce =

American writer (1942–2020)

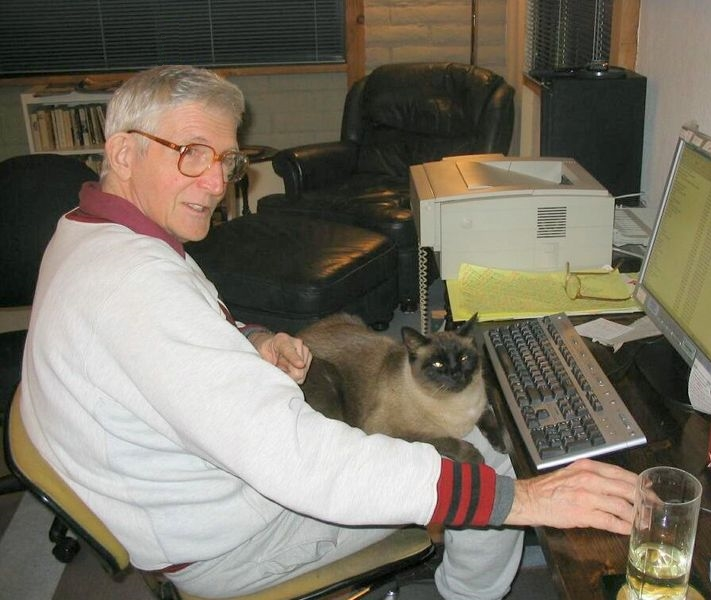
- Hayford Peirce in his Tucson office in 2006
- Born: January 7, 1942; Bangor, Maine, U.S.
- Died: November 19, 2020 (aged 78); Tucson, Arizona, U.S.
- Occupation: Writer
- Writing career
- Genres: Science fiction Mysteries; Spy thriller

Hayford Peirce (January 7, 1942 – November 19, 2020) was an American writer of science fiction, mysteries, and a spy thriller. He wrote numerous short stories for the science-fiction magazines Analog, Galaxy, and Omni, as well as mystery shorts for Alfred Hitchcock's Mystery Magazine and Ellery Queen's Mystery Magazine.

The Encyclopedia of Science Fiction states that "he established a name for lightly written tales whose backgrounds were unusually well conceived."

== Biography ==
Peirce was born in 1942 in Bangor, Maine. His father, also named Hayford, a recognized authority on Byzantine art, wrote several books on the subject in French.

Peirce began writing in 1974, with the sale of "Unlimited Warfare", a science fiction short story to Analog magazine.

In 2017, The Motley Fool published a financial article describing how Peirce became a "dividend millionaire" by investing in high-dividend stocks over a 22-year period.

== Writing career ==
Peirce wrote a number of science fiction and mystery novels, some of which were published by Tor Books, and the others by Wildside Press. They have been translated into several languages. Typical of them are Napoleon Disentimed and Blood on the Hibiscus. His one spy thriller, written in London in 1968 at the height of the fictional spy mania, was The Bel Air Blitz.

Many of his short stories concern on-going protagonists. In the science fiction field there have been collections of his Chap Foey Rider, Capitalist to the Stars stories, of his Jonathan White, Stockbroker in Orbit stories, and of his Sam Fearon, Time Scanner stories. In the mystery field, he has had two collections about protagonists living in Tahiti, Commissaire Tama, a chief of police, and Joe Caneili, a private eye.

Peirce also collaborated with David M. Alexander on stories that have appeared in Analog.

== Death ==
On November 19, 2020, Peirce was found in critical condition at his home in Tucson, Arizona, with a self-inflicted gunshot wound; his wife, Wanda Zhang Peirce, was found dead at the scene in "a possible murder suicide", according to police. Peirce was hospitalized, and subsequently died. His wife was the former owner of Wanda Z's Chinese, a restaurant in Oro Valley which had closed in 2015.

== Bibliography ==
=== Science fiction ===
- Napoleon Disentimed, Tor Books (1987) ISBN 0-8125-4898-1
- The Thirteenth Majestral (1989), reissued as Dinosaur Park (1994) ISBN 0-8125-4892-2 (both editions)
- Phylum Monsters, Tor Books (1989) ISBN 0-8125-4894-9
- Chap Foey Rider, Capitalist to the Stars (2000) (short story collection)
- Jonathan White, Stockbroker in Orbit (2001) (short story collection)
- The Burr in the Garden of Eden, Wildside Press (2001) ISBN 1-58715-277-0 (first published in Germany as Ein Paradies mit Tücken, (1998), Heyne)
- Sam Fearon: Time Scanner (2001) (short story collection)
- Flickerman, Wildside Press (2001)
- The Spark of Life, Wildside Press (2001)
- Black Hole Planet, Betancourt & Company (2003) ISBN 1-59224-935-3
- Aliens, Betancourt & Company (2003) (short story collection)
- With a Bang, and Other Forbidden Delights (2005) (short story collection)
- The 13th Death of Yuri Gellaski, Wildside Press (2005) ISBN 0-8095-8944-3
- In the Flames of the Flickerman , Wildside Press (2011) ISBN 978-1-4344-3037-3

=== Mysteries and spy thriller ===
- Trouble in Tahiti: Blood on the Hibiscus (2000)
- Trouble in Tahiti: P.I. Joe Caneili, Discrétion Assurée (2000)
- Trouble in Tahiti: Commissaire Tama, Chief of Police (2000)
- Trouble in Tahiti: The Gauguin Murders (2001)
- The Bel Air Blitz (2002)
