= David M. Alexander =

American author

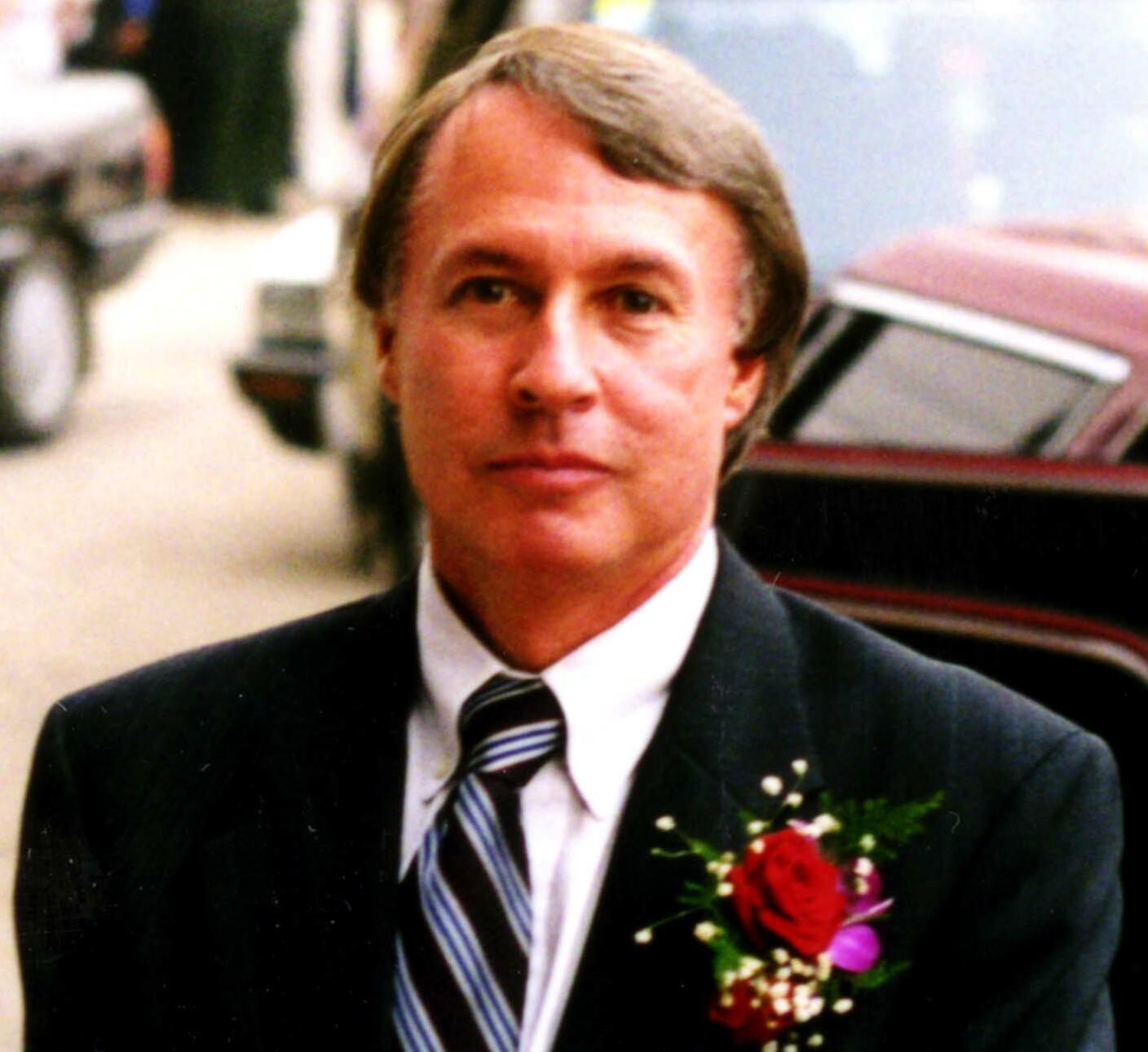
- David Alexander, October 2000
- Born: 1945 (age 80–81)

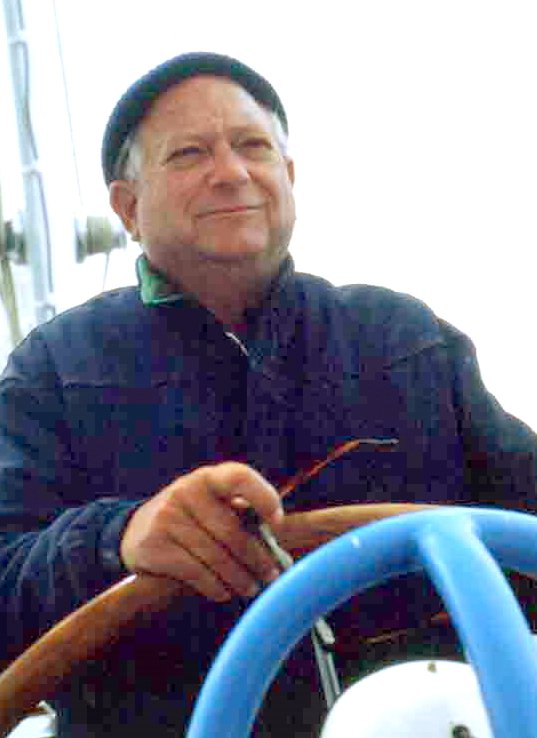
Photo of Jack Vance by David Alexander, early 1980s

David M. Alexander, born in 1945 in upstate New York, is a writer of science fiction and mysteries who now lives in Palo Alto, California. Novels published under his own name are The Chocolate Spy, Fane, and My Real Name Is Lisa. Beginning in 2003, however, to avoid confusion with other writers with the same name, he began publishing under the pen name of David Grace: in that year Wildside Press published The Eyes Of The Blind under the David Grace name. All subsequent works, both novels and stories in magazines, have been published as by David Grace. He has written ten stories for leading magazines: science-fiction for Analog both by himself and as a collaborator with Hayford Peirce, and mysteries for Alfred Hitchcock's Mystery Magazine. Alexander shared story credit with Dan Wright and Sam Egan for an Outer Limits TV series episode, "Joyride", starring Cliff Robertson that was broadcast during the 2000 season.

Alexander graduated from Stanford University in 1967 with a major in history and a minor in economics, then received a Doctor of Laws degree from the. University of California, Berkeley Law School, in June 1970, graduating in the top ten percent of his class. He was licensed to practice law in California in January 1971 and in November 1977 was sworn in by Chief Justice Warren Burger and authorized to argue cases before the Supreme Court of the United States.

== Bibliography ==
=== Novels ===
==== As by David Alexander ====
- The Chocolate Spy, Coward, McCann & Geoghegan, NYC, 1976, ISBN 0-698-10909-0
- Fane, Pocket Books/Timescape Books, NYC, 1981, ISBN 0-671-83154-2

re-published as The Accidental Magician

Smashwords.com, ebook, 2009. ISBN 978-1-4523-3905-4
Wildside Press, Rockville, MD, trade paperback, 2010, ISBN 978-1-4344-1755-8

- My Real Name Is Lisa, Caroll & Graf, NYC, 1996, ISBN 0-7867-0310-5

re-published as Stolen Angel

Smashwords.com, ebook, 2009, ISBN 978-1-4523-7739-1
Wildside Press, Rockville, MD, trade paperback, 2011, ISBN 978-1-4344-3089-2

==== As by David Grace ====
- The Eyes Of The Blind, Wildside Press, Rockville, MD, 2003, ISBN 1-59224-107-7

re-published as True Faith

Smashwords.com, ebook, 2009, ISBN 978-1-4523-9140-3
Wildside Press, Rockville, MD, 2011, ISBN 978-1-4344-3091-5

- Etched In Bone, Smashwords.com, ebook, 2009, ISBN 978-1-4523-3105-8

Wildside Press, Rockville, MD, trade paperback, 2011, ISBN 978-1-4344-3086-1

- Doll's Eyes, Smashwords.com, ebook, 2009, ISBN 978-1-4523-7119-1

Wildside Press, Rockville, MD, trade paperback, 2011, ISBN 978-1-4344-3034-2

- The Forbidden List, Smashwords.com, ebook, 2009, ISBN 978-1-4523-3905-4

Wildside Press, Rockville, MD, trade paperback, 2011, ISBN 978-1-4344-3088-5

- A Death In Beverly Hills, Smashwords.com, ebook, 2009, ISBN 978-1-4523-9584-5

Wildside Press, Rockville, MD, trade paperback, 2010, ISBN 978-1-4344-1619-3

- Easy Target, Smashwords.com, ebook, 2009, ISBN 978-1-4523-5609-9

Wildside Press, Rockville, MD, trade paperback, 2011, ISBN 978-1-4344-3085-4

- Fever Dreams, Smashwords.com, ebook, 2009, ISBN 978-1-4523-8693-5

Wildside Press, Rockville, MD, trade paperback, 2011, ISBN 978-1-4344-3087-8

- The Traitor's Mistress, Smashwords.com, ebook, 2009, ISBN 978-1-4523-9942-3

Wildside Press, Rockville, MD, trade paperback, 2011, ISBN 978-1-4344-3090-8

- Daniel, Smashwords.com, ebook, 2011, ISBN 978-1-4581-1750-2
- Shooting Crows At Dawn, Smashwords.com, ebook, 2011, ISBN 978-1-4581-5237-4

=== Short fiction ===
==== As by David Alexander ====
- "Best of Breed", novelette with Hayford Peirce, as by David Alexander and Hayford Peirce, Analog, December 1994 issue
- "Finder's Fee", novelette with Hayford Peirce as by David Alexander and Hayford Peirce, Analog, cover story, April 1997 issue
- "Felony Stupid", short story, Analog, summer 1997 issue
- "Tramp" (1998), novelette Analog, March 1998 issue
- "Shrink Wrapped", short story, Analog, April 1998 issue
- "Elephants' Graveyard", with Hayford Peirce as by David Alexander and Hayford Peirce, Analog, March 1999 issue

==== As by David Grace ====
- "The Human Dress", novelette, Analog, March 2003 issue
- "Piece Work", short story, Alfred Hitchcock’s Mystery Magazine, November 2004 issue
- "Willie Bats", short story, Alfred Hitchcock’s Mystery Magazine, March 2005 issue
- "Forever Mommy". Analog. 128 (9): 74–79. September 2008.
