= Algis Budrys =

Lithuanian-American author, editor, and critic (1931–2008)

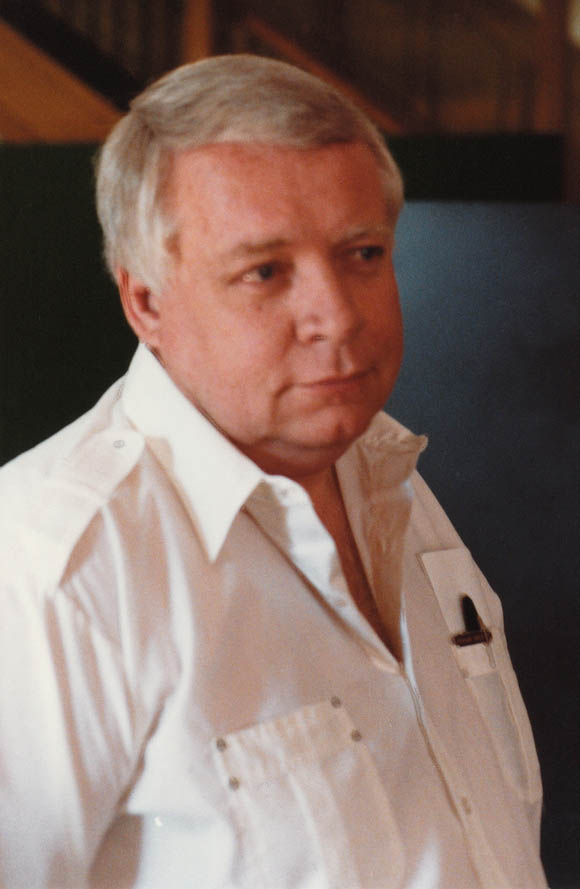
- Budrys in 1985
- Born: January 9, 1931; Königsberg, East Prussia, German Reich
- Died: June 9, 2008 (aged 77); Evanston, Illinois, U.S.
- Education: University of Miami (no degree); Columbia University (no degree)
- Occupations: Novelist; short story writer; editor; critic
- Spouse: Edna Duna
- Children: 4
- Relatives: Jonas Budrys (father)
- Writing career
- Genre: Science fiction
- Notable works: The Falling Torch, Rogue Moon, Who?

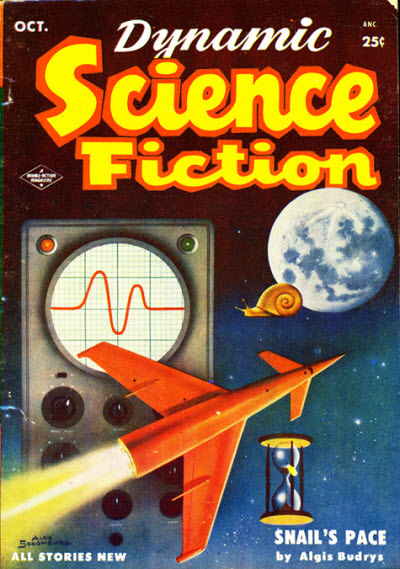
Budrys's "Snail's Pace" was the cover story in the October 1953 issue of Dynamic Science Fiction.

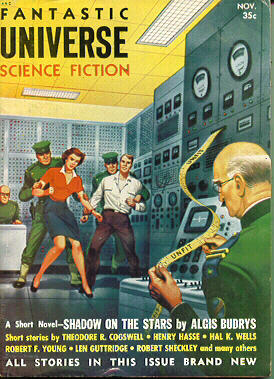
Budrys's novelette "Shadow on the Stars" was cover-featured on the November 1954 issue of Fantastic Universe.

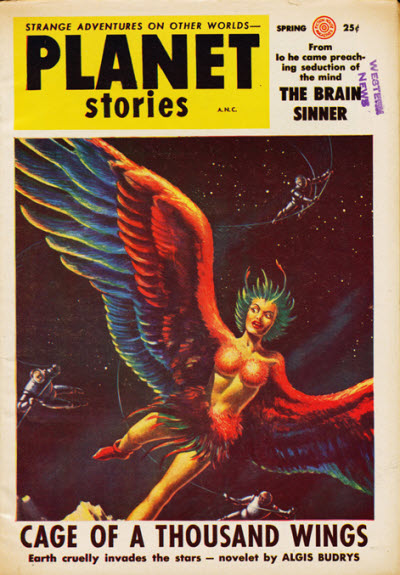
Budrys's short story "Cage of a Thousand Wings" was the cover feature in the penultimate issue of Planet Stories in 1955.

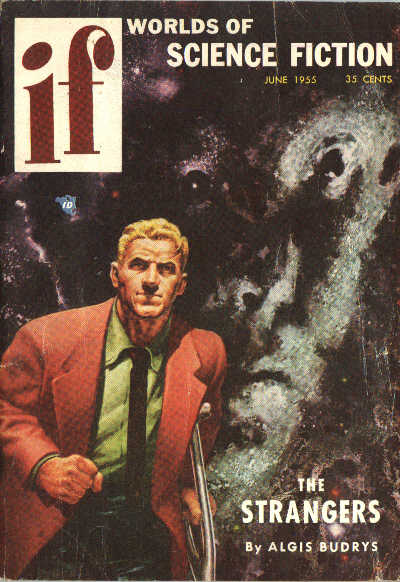
Budrys's novelette "The Strangers" was the cover story for the June 1955 issue of If.

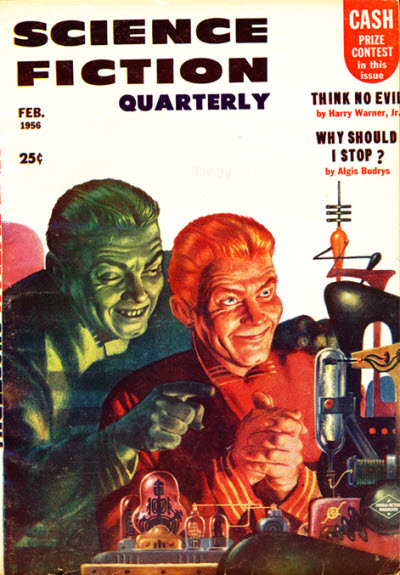
Budrys's novelette "Why Should I Stop?" was featured on the cover of the February 1956 issue of Science Fiction Quarterly.

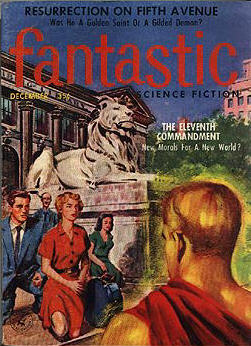
Budrys wrote "Resurrection on Fifth Avenue" for Fantastic under his pseudonym "Gordon Jaulyn".

Algirdas Jonas "Algis" Budrys (January 9, 1931 – June 9, 2008) was a Lithuanian-American science fiction author, editor and critic. He was also known under the pen names Frank Mason, Alger Rome in collaboration with Jerome Bixby, John A. Sentry, William Scarff and Paul Janvier. In the 1990s he was the publisher and editor of the science fiction magazine Tomorrow Speculative Fiction.

== Biography ==
=== Early life and education ===
Budrys was born in Königsberg, Germany (present-day Kaliningrad, Russia). His father Jonas Budrys was the consul general of Lithuania. In 1936, when Budrys was five years old, Jonas was appointed as the consul general in New York City.

After the Soviet Union's occupation of Lithuania in 1940, Budrys helped his family run a chicken farm in New Jersey while his father was part of the exiled Lithuanian Diplomatic Service, since the United States continued to recognize the pre-World War II Lithuanian diplomats.

Budrys was educated at the University of Miami and later at Columbia University in New York City.

=== Career ===
Incorporating his family's experience, Budrys's fiction depicts isolated and damaged people and themes of identity, survival and legacy. He taught himself English at the age of six by reading Robinson Crusoe. From Flash Gordon comic strips, Budrys read H. G. Wells's The Time Machine; Astounding Science Fiction caused him at the age of 11 to want to become a science fiction writer. His first published science fiction story was "The High Purpose", which appeared in Astounding in 1952.

In 1952, Budrys worked as editor and manager for such science fiction publishers as Gnome Press and Galaxy Science Fiction. Some of Budrys's science fiction in the 1950s was published under the pen name "John A. Sentry", a reconfigured Anglification of his Lithuanian name. Among his other pseudonyms in the SF magazines of the 1950s and elsewhere, several revived as bylines for vignettes in his magazine Tomorrow Speculative Fiction, is "William Scarff". Budrys also wrote several stories under the names "Ivan Janvier" or "Paul Janvier", and used "Alger Rome" in his collaborations with Jerome Bixby.

Budrys's 1960 novella Rogue Moon was nominated for a Hugo Award and was later anthologized in The Science Fiction Hall of Fame, Volume Two (1973). His Cold War science fiction novel Who? was adapted for the screen in 1973. In addition to numerous Hugo Award and Nebula Award nominations, Budrys won the Science Fiction Research Association's 2007 Pilgrim Award for lifetime contributions to speculative fiction scholarship. In 2009, he was the posthumous recipient of one of the first three Solstice Awards presented by the SFWA in recognition of his contributions to the field of science fiction.

Having published about 100 stories and a half-dozen novels, with a wife and children to support, after 1960 Budrys wrote less fiction and worked in publishing, editing and advertising. He became better known as among science fiction's best critics than as writer, reviewing for Galaxy Science Fiction and The Magazine of Fantasy & Science Fiction, a book editor for Playboy, a longtime teacher at the Clarion Writers Workshop and an organizer and judge for the L. Ron Hubbard Writers and Illustrators of the Future contest.

Budrys also worked as a publicist; in a famous publicity stunt, he erected a giant pickle on the proposed site of the Chicago Picasso during the time the newly arriving sculpture was embroiled in controversy.

=== Death ===
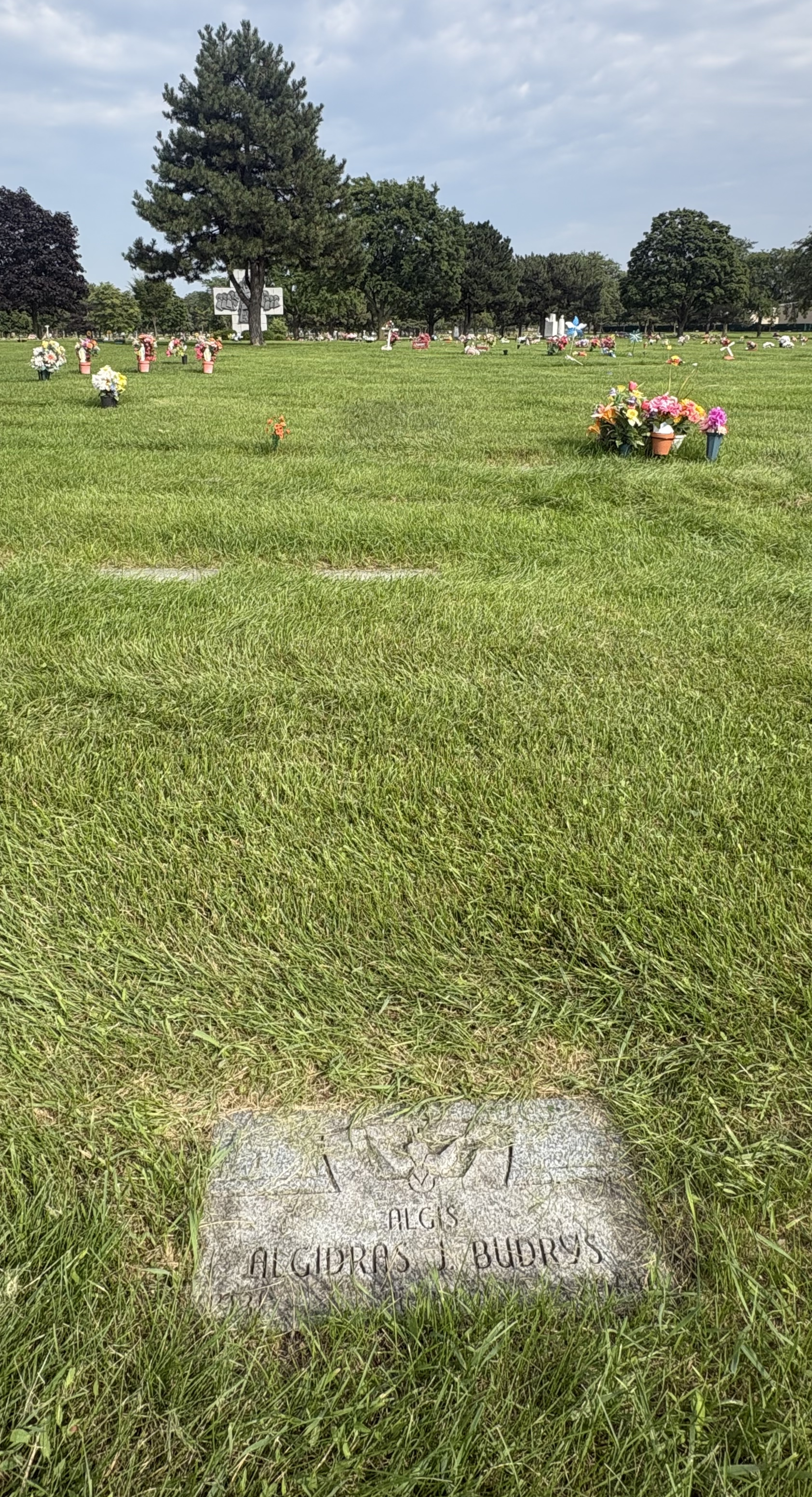
Budrys's grave at Maryhill Catholic Cemetery

Algis Budrys last resided in Evanston, Illinois, where he died from metastatic melanoma on June 9, 2008, at age 77. He was buried at Maryhill Catholic Cemetery in Niles.

== Bibliography ==
=== Novels ===
- False Night (1954)
- Man of Earth (1956)
- Who? (1958)
- The Falling Torch (1959)
- Rogue Moon (1960)
- Some Will Not Die (1961) (an expanded and restored version of False Night)
- The Iron Thorn (1967) (as serialized in If; revised and published in book form as The Amsirs and the Iron Thorn). On a bleak forbidding planet, humans hunt Amsirs – flightless humanoid birds – and vice versa. After one young hunter makes his first kill, he is initiated into the society's secrets. Still, he figures there are secrets the human race has forgotten altogether, and begins to hunt for answers.
- Michaelmas (1977)
- Hard Landing (1993)
- The Death Machine (2001) (originally published as Rogue Moon against Budrys's wishes)

=== Collections (fiction, essays, and mixed) ===
- The Unexpected Dimension (1960)
- Budrys' Inferno (1963)
- The Furious Future (1963)
- Blood and Burning (1978)
- Benchmarks: Galaxy Bookshelf (1985)
- Writing to the Point (1994)
- Outposts: Literatures of Milieux (1996)
- Entertainment (1997)
- The Electric Gene Machine (2000)
- Benchmarks Continued: F&SF "Books" Columns 1975-1982 (2012)
- Benchmarks Revisited: F&SF "Books" Columns 1983-1986 (2013)
- Benchmarks Concluded: F&SF "Books" Columns 1987-1993 (2013)

=== Short stories ===
- "The High Purpose" (1952) in Astounding Science Fiction
- "Walk to the World" (1952) in Space Science Fiction, Nov 1952
- "The Congruent People" (1953) in Star Science Fiction Stories No. 2 (edited by Frederik Pohl), 1953
- "Protective Mimicry" in Galaxy Science Fiction, 1953.
- "Riya's Foundling" (1953) in Science Fiction Stories, 1953.
- "The End of Summer" (1954) in Astounding Science Fiction; also published in the short story anthology Penguin Science Fiction (edited by Brian Aldiss, 1961).
- "Ironclad" in Galaxy Science Fiction, 1954.
- "Citadel" (1955) in Astounding Science Fiction, February 1955.
- "Nobody Bothers Gus" (1955) published in Astounding Science Fiction, November 1955.
- "Calculated Decision" in Science Fiction Quarterly, November 1956.
- "The War is Over" (1957) first appeared in Astounding Science Fiction Feb. 1957. Also published in the short story anthology 13 Great Stories of Science Fiction (edited by Groff Conklin, 1960).
- "The Barbarians" (1958) (as John Sentry) in If, February 1958.
- "The Stoker and the Stars" (1959) (as John A. Sentry) in Astounding Science Fiction, February 1959.
- "The Price" (1960) — first appeared in The Magazine of Fantasy & Science Fiction, February 1960. Also published in the short story anthology The War Book (edited by James Sallis, 1969).
- "Wall of Crystal, Eye of Night" in Galaxy, December 1961
- "For Love" (originally published in Galaxy Science Fiction, June 1962) — appears in The Seventh Galaxy Reader edited by Frederik Pohl (Doubleday Science Fiction, 1964).
- " Die, Shadow!" in If, May 1963.
- "Be Merry" (1966) published in If, December 1966, Vol. 16, No. 12, Issue 109.
- "The Master of the Hounds" (1966) first published in The Saturday Evening Post and an Edgar Award nominee.

=== Audio recording ===
- 84.2 Minutes of Algis Budrys (1995), Unifont (Budrys's own company). Released on cassette, this featured Budrys reading his short stories "The Price", "The Distant Sound of Engines", "Never Meet Again", and "Explosions!".

=== Interviews ===
- Taking Your Chances (1990) in Leading Edge #20/21

=== Magazine ===
- Tomorrow Speculative Fiction (1993–2000); initially edited by Budrys and published by Pulphouse Publishing, with its second issue it was published and edited by Budrys with assistance from Kandis Elliott under the Unifont rubric. It ceased publication as a paper and ink magazine and became a webzine late in the decade. Nine of the 24 print issues contained a story by Budrys, almost always under one of his pseudonyms.

=== Anthologies ===
- L. Ron Hubbard Presents Writers of the Future, Vol. III (1987)
- L. Ron Hubbard Presents Writers of the Future, Vol. 6 (1990)
- L. Ron Hubbard Presents Writers of the Future, Vol 12 (1996)
- L. Ron Hubbard Presents Writers of the Future Vol. 16 (2000)
- L. Ron Hubbard Presents Writers of the Future, Vol 19 (2003)
