= In Yana, the Touch of Undying =

1985 novel by Michael Shea

In Yana, the Touch of Undying is a novel by Michael Shea published in 1985.

== Plot summary ==
In Yana, the Touch of Undying is a novel in which the hero seeks a place where immortality is possible.

== Reception ==
Dave Langford reviewed In Yana, the Touch of Undying for White Dwarf #95, and stated that "witty and erudite, though sometimes confusingly written."

== Reviews ==
- Review by Faren Miller (1985) in Locus, #299 December 1985
- Review by Algis Budrys (1986) in The Magazine of Fantasy & Science Fiction, April 1986
- Review by Don D'Ammassa (1986) in Science Fiction Chronicle, #86 November 1986
