= Michaelmas (novel) =

1977 novel by Algis Budrys

- First edition
- Author: Algis Budrys
- Cover artist: Don Brautigam
- Language: English
- Genre: Science fiction novel
- Publisher: Berkley Putnam
- Publication date: 1976 (serialized); 1977 (novel)
- Publication place: United States
- Media type: Print (hardback & paperback)
- Pages: 212
- ISBN: 0-445-20316-1

Michaelmas (1977) is a science fiction novel by American writer Algis Budrys, first published as a serial in The Magazine of Fantasy & Science Fiction in August and September 1976, and published in revised form as a novel in 1977. Michaelmas is largely about a renowned newsman who in fact controls, rather than simply reports events thanks to his AI creation "Domino". The protagonist and narrative are loosely based on the world-protector Archangel Michael, while the book contains convincing near-future technology.

== Publication ==
Michaelmas first appeared in the form of a two-part serial in Fantasy & Science Fiction in August and September 1976. It was published as a novel (in revised form) from Berkley Putnam in 1977, with a simultaneous British edition from Gollancz. A book club edition appeared in 1978, along with the mass-market paperback edition from Berkley. A Questar (Popular Library) paperback reprint appeared in 1986.

== Story ==
The novel is set in the near future (at least at the time of writing, now actually in past time).

The eponymous protagonist, Laurent Michaelmas, is depicted as a renowned newsman, controlling world events as much as he reports them. His means of influence is an immensely powerful self-aware artificial intelligence called Domino, which originated as a modest telephony appliance in Michaelmas' youth. Domino has evolved into a digital omnipresence that can penetrate and control any electronic or computerized equipment, most notably communication networks of all kinds. Domino was created by Michaelmas, and only he knows its existence.

Domino is also the confidante and intellectual sparring partner of Michelmas, compensating in part for the loss that Michaelmas suffered when his wife was killed in an accident many years ago.

By the time of the novel, Laurent Michaelmas has successfully used his power to create and sustain world peace. One of his achievements is the success of UNAC (the fictitious United Nations Astronautics Commission). Organizing space travel as a joint international project, UNAC is important to Michaelmas as a symbol of a more united world. When an astronaut believed to have been killed in a failed mission turns up miraculously saved, a threatening scenario starts to unfold. As the novel progresses, Michaelmas slowly learns that a possible extraterrestrial presence may be interfering with the new world he has worked so hard to create.

== Themes ==
The novel is not only a fast-paced political/sci-fi thriller, but is also remarkable for its prescience, because it appeared less than a decade into the Internet era, long before its current prominence and ubiquity. The technical descriptions of near future technologies are very convincing and apparently well researched. Its description of journalism and its professional culture are likewise highly developed, mainly due to the late Budrys' residence near Northwestern University's Medill School of Journalism, which appears several times in the book.

Throughout the book, many references are made to classical works of art, theater, poetry and philosophy.

The main character, Laurent Michaelmas, bears the name of the festival honoring the Archangel Michael, a figure in Judaism that protects God's people, and in Christianity that defeats Satan in the Book of Revelation. In the novel, Michaelmas helps to protect society from itself by influencing the balances of power in the world to avoid war and maintain relative peace.

== Related works ==
The novel incorporates features of a substantially shorter and significantly different version published in The Magazine of Fantasy & Science Fiction in 1976.
