= Nifft the Lean =

1982 fantasy collection by Michael Shea

- Author: Michael Shea
- Genre: Fantasy
- Publisher: DAW Books
- Publication date: 1982

Nifft the Lean is a fantasy collection by Michael Shea published in 1982.

== Plot ==
Nifft the Lean is a collection of four stories involving Nifft the master thief.

First story, Come Then, Mortal -- We Will Seek Her Soul, has Nifft and his companion Haldar are hired to complete a lover's vengeance from beyond the grave, with a valuable magic item as their payment.

Second story, The Pearls of the Vampire Queen, involves Nifft and another companion, Barnar, poaching valuable swamp pearls, and interfering with a ritual by the titular vampire queen.

Third story, The Fishing of the Demon-Sea has Nifft and Barnar magically compelled to go into a demonic underworld to save a merchant prince's son, that has been caught by a sea-demon he summoned. The rescue does not go without complications.

Fourth story, The Goddess in Glass, has Nifft at the mining city of Anvil's Pasture, involved in the efforts to save the city from a collapsing mountain with the help of a cult of a dead alien goddess. Again, things do not develop the way the people of the city expected or hoped.

== Reception ==
Despite being a collection and not a novel, Nifft the Lean won the World Fantasy Award for Best Novel in 1983.

Dave Langford reviewed Nifft the Lean for White Dwarf #42, and stated that "In this garish hell, people suffer grotesque transformations and torments, described with vast relish and elaboration; the visceral variety of Shea's unpleasantness never flags, and the gaudy landscapes infect your dreams. I enjoyed this one."

== Reviews ==
- Review by Faren Miller (1982) in Locus, #263 December 1982
- Review by Baird Searles (1983) in Isaac Asimov's Science Fiction Magazine, June 1983
- Review by Vincent Omniaveritas (1983) in Cheap Truth #1
- Review by Algis Budrys (1984) in The Magazine of Fantasy & Science Fiction, August 1984
- Review by David Pringle (1988) in Modern Fantasy: The Hundred Best Novels

== See also ==
- World Fantasy Award for Best Novel
