= Eight Fantasms and Magics =

1969 collection of science fiction and fantasy stories by Jack Vance

- First edition cover
- Author: Jack Vance
- Cover artist: Anthony Sini
- Language: English
- Genre: Science fiction and fantasy short stories
- Publisher: Macmillan
- Publication date: 1969
- Publication place: United States
- Media type: Print (hardback & paperback)
- Pages: 288 pp
- OCLC: 17424

Eight Fantasms and Magics is a collection of science fiction and fantasy stories by Jack Vance. It was originally published by Macmillan in 1969 and reprinted in paperback by Collier Books in 1970. No further editions have been issued.

== Contents ==
- "Foreword"
- "The Miracle-Workers" (Astounding 1958)
- "When the Five Moons Rise" (Cosmos SF&F 1954)
- "Telek" (Astounding 1952)
- "Noise" (Startling Stories 1952)
- "The New Prime" (Worlds Beyond 1951)
- "Cil" (The Eyes of the Overworld 1966)
- "Guyal of Sfere" (The Dying Earth 1950)
- "The Men Return" (Infinity Science Fiction 1957)

"The New Prime" was originally published as "Brain of the Galaxy".

== Reception ==
James Blish praised Vance's "marvelous feeling for the telling of sensual detail, his incantatory tone, his muted humor, his rather arcane vocabulary, his ear for exactly the right proper names, his love for the medieval and for anachronisms in general", and found the stories to be logical fantasies in the best of that tradition, exquisitely formed and offered with the modesty of a master who does not need to distract the reader by showing off." P. Schuyler Miller also reviewed the collection favorably, placing the stories on "the borderline between science fiction and fantasy" and ranking Vance as "a master of the genre."
