= Rhialto the Marvellous =

1984 short story collection by Jack Vance

- Dust-jacket of the first, Special edition
- Author: Jack Vance
- Illustrator: Stephen E. Fabian
- Cover artist: Stephen E. Fabian (first, depicted); Kevin Eugene Johnson
- Language: English
- Series: Dying Earth
- Genre: Fantasy, Dying Earth subgenre
- Publisher: Brandywyne Books (first); Baen Books
- Publication date: August 1984; November 1984
- Publication place: United States
- Media type: Print (hardcover)
- Pages: 198 (first); 219
- ISBN: 0-88733-004-5 (first); ISBN 0-671-55911-7
- OCLC: 11554599
- Preceded by: Cugel's Saga

Rhialto the Marvellous is a collection of one essay and three fantasy stories by American writer Jack Vance, first published in 1984 by Brandywyne Books, a special edition three months before the regular (below). It is the fourth and concluding book in the Dying Earth series that Vance inaugurated in 1950. One of the stories was previously published.

== Contents ==
The foreword and first two stories were original to the collection. "Morreion" was originally published in the Lin Carter-edited anthology Flashing Swords! 1 (1973).

=== "Foreword" ===
In which the list of players and the general state of the world in the 21st Aeon are defined.

=== "The Murthe" ===
The Sorceress Llorio, also known as the Murthe, has journeyed through time to the 21st Aeon, and is transforming the wizards of that era into women. Rhialto and his colleague, Ildefonse the Preceptor, attempt to foil her plans with the aid of the mysterious time-traveller Lehuster.

=== "Fader's Waft" ===
A series of intrigues perpetrated by his colleague Hache-Moncour land Rhialto in the bad graces of his fellow wizards. Whilst he is away, they ransack his manse and appropriate many valuable items in supposed recompense. On his return, Rhialto accuses his colleagues of violating the "Blue Principles", their code of conduct, and insists on examining the original document of the "Principles", stored at Fader's Waft. Upon arrival, Rhialto and Ildefonse discover that the "Principles" have been replaced with a forgery, and Rhialto undertakes a journey back through time to recover the original.

=== "Morreion" ===
Rhialto and his associates journey towards the edge of the Universe to seek their erstwhile colleague Morreion, sent away in the distant past to locate the source of the valuable, magic-annulling IOUN stones.

== Editions ==
The special edition preceded by three months the regular hardcover edition (Baen, cover artist Kevin Johnson).

For its predecessor Cugel's Saga, the special edition had followed eight months after the regular hardcover. Fabian and Johnson remained the cover artists but the publishers (or imprints) changed. The special editions were "550 signed and numbered copies" at $30 (vol 3), "Slipcased, signed and limited to 1000 copies" at $40 (vol 4).

In the articles about both books, the upper-right inset provides bibliographic data for both editions.

== Characters ==
The most powerful wizards of the 21st Aeon of the Dying Earth are banded together in an association, and mostly reside in the territories of Ascolais and Almery. Unlike other wizards of the Dying Earth, such as Turjan and Mazirian, these wizards possess nearly godlike power. Much of their power comes from their ability to bind and control potent genie-like beings called sandestins, while they also derive power from their large stores of magical relics. Their conduct toward one another is governed by a set of rules called the Blue Principles, because they're inscribed upon a blue stone which displays them through a sort of projector. Restrictions from The Dying Earth, that wizards can memorize only few spells by stringent study, which are forgotten again when used, appear to be missing from the Cugel and Rhialto cycles.

Because the wizards are so powerful, they have little to fear except from one another and from powerful external threats such as the archveults. Thus, while the Blue Principles acts as a nonaggression pact and a defensive alliance, most of the time it serves as a social circle and gentleman's club. The members spend most of their time enjoying fine food and drink, courting ladies of the nearby kingdoms, conversing, and squabbling with one another over magical relics, or playing pranks on one another.

- Rhialto the Marvellous, the titular wizard of the last book in the Dying Earth trilogy, and the primary focus of the stories involving the wizards of the 21st Aeon. Rhialto, like most of the others, is a wealthy and powerful wizard who rules an opulent estate, Falu. Also like most of his fellows, he enjoys epicurean pleasures and the company of beautiful women, but maintains no serious relationships. Normally appearing as a slim man with short black hair and austere features, he earned the title "The Marvellous" because of his reputation as a dandy who wears ostentatious, ornate clothing and is popular with women. Rhialto is ordinarily agreeable and carefree, but his fellow wizards regard him as somewhat supercilious.
- Ildefonse is the elected "Preceptor" of the compact; he is invested with broad powers and effectively acts as a chairman or mediator of the compact’s meetings and members. Although Ildefonse is prone to hedonism and squabbling like his fellow wizards, he's generally much more temperate and level-headed than the others. His ordinary appearance is of a portly, bald middle-aged man with blue eyes and blond whiskers, which he habitually tugs at when vexed. Rhialto maintains a closer friendship with him than with any of the other wizards. His manse, a four-towered castle named Boumergarth, sits next to the River Scaum.
- Ao of the Opals, "saturnine, with a pointed black beard and a caustic manner."
- Barbanikos, "short and squat with a great puff of white hair."
- Byzant the Necrope.
- Darvilk the Miaanther, who wears a black domino mask for unknown reasons.
- Dulce-Lolo, a "portly epicure."
- Eshmiel, who delightfully affects an appearance which is, from head to toe, half-white and half-black, split vertically down the center. His home and possessions are similarly colored.
- Gilgad, known for his clammy touch and his clothing, which is always rose-red.
- Hache-Moncour, a vindictive wizard who is jealous of Rhialto's manner, and sets out to destroy his position due to a perceived slight on Rhialto's part. He wears the appearance of a nature-god with fine features and bronze curls.
- Haze of Wheary Water. Haze appears as a wisp, an aquatic humanoid with green skin and orange willow-leaves for hair. Whether this is his true appearance, or just a magical affectation, is unknown.
- Herark the Harbinger.
- Hurtiancz, "short and burly," notorious for his short temper and irritability. He wears false teeth made from carved rubies.
- Morreion, an exceptionally powerful amnesiac wizard who spent Aeons trapped far from Earth. Unlike most wizards, he eschews spells for simple gestures powered by "personal force."
- Mune the Mage, who speaks little; unlike the other wizards, he is married, having four spouses.
- Nahourezzin, a scholar from Old Romarth, a city which appears in some of Vance's other works.
- Panderleou, whose passion is collecting rare and exotic artifacts from various dimensions.
- Perdustin, an especially secretive mage. He has no real friends, and refuses to reveal his place of residence.
- Shrue, a diabolist. Thin and pale, he is a scholar of the demon-realms, and his fellow wizards find him agreeable but his witticisms disturbing.
- Tchamast: In sharp contrast to the other wizards of the compact, Tchamast is a morose ascetic who is extremely mistrustful of women, so much that he only allows male insects into his home.
- Teutch, who rarely speaks with his mouth, but uses magic to flick words from his fingertips. He is an Elder of the Hub, a philosophical academy which Cugel encountered on his own journeys, which holds that reality is like a wheel with an uncertain number of infinities as its "spokes". As an Elder, he is accorded control over a "private infinity".
- Vermoulian the Dream-Walker, described as "peculiarly tall and thin, with a stately stride." Vermoulian lives in a magnificent floating palace which can travel to the far corners of the known universe, and can also view, enter, and record the dreams of others. He has a collection of "recordings" of beautiful women from ages past, stored in bottles. The women can be brought to life for a time, but once dismissed and recalled, they reappear with no memory of their last manifestation.
- Zahoulik-Khuntze, known for his iron fingernails and toenails which are inscribed with strange runes.
- Zanzel Melancthones, who is friendly with Rhialto and Ildefonse.
- Zilifant, "robust of body, with long brown hair and a flowing beard."

== Sources ==
- Brown, Charles N.; William G. Contento. "The Locus Index to Science Fiction (1984-1998)".
- Chalker, Jack L.; Mark Owings (1998). The Science-Fantasy Publishers: A Bibliographic History, 1923-1998. Westminster, MD and Baltimore: Mirage Press, Ltd. p. 780.
