= Cugel's Saga =

1983 fantasy novel by Jack Vance

- Dust-jacket of the first edition
- Author: Jack Vance
- Cover artist: Kevin Eugene Johnson; Stephen E. Fabian (second)
- Language: English
- Series: Dying Earth
- Genre: Fantasy, Dying Earth subgenre
- Publisher: Timescape Books (first); Underwood-Miller
- Publication date: November 1983; June 1984 (second)
- Publication place: United States
- Media type: Print (hardcover)
- Pages: 334 pp (1983–84 eds.)
- ISBN: 0-671-49450-3 (first); ISBN 0-934438-83-8
- OCLC: 9919734
- Preceded by: The Eyes of the Overworld
- Followed by: Rhialto the Marvellous

Cugel's Saga is a picaresque fantasy novel by American writer Jack Vance, published by Timescape in 1983, the third book in the Dying Earth series, the first volume of which appeared in 1950. The narrative of Cugel's Saga continues from the point at which it left off at the end of The Eyes of the Overworld (1966).

The Internet Speculative Fiction Database calls Cugel's Saga "[t]wice as large and less episodic than Eyes of the Overworld", and catalogs it as a novel rather than a fix-up, but also qualifies that label. "This is marketed as a novel, but there is a table of contents, and some of the parts were previously published (although none are acknowledged thus)."

== Plot summary ==
The story begins on Shanglestone Strand, a desolate beach far to the north of Almery, where Cugel had been dumped at the end of The Eyes of the Overworld by a winged demon after he mispronounced the spell intended to inflict the same fate on his nemesis, Iucounu the Laughing Magician. Avoiding the village of Smolod, the scene of his first adventure in The Eyes of the Overworld and where "memories are long", Cugel heads down Shanglestone Strand and arrives at Flutic, a manse owned by the avaricious Master Twango, whose business is salvaging the scales of an Overworld entity named Sadlark from a miry pit in his back garden. The scales are sold to the firm of Soldinck and Mercantides, who trans-ship them to a customer in Almery. Taking employment at Flutic, through sheer luck Cugel obtains the Pectoral Skybreak Spatterlight, the most valuable of all the scales, as it constitutes Sadlark's central node of force, or "protonastic centrum". The Skybreak Spatterlight, which absorbs every living creature with which it comes into contact, imprisoning them in limbo, is central to the plot of the novel since it is coveted by none other than Iucounu, the mysterious final customer for the scales, who believes himself to be Sadlark's avatar and is trying to reconstruct the Overworld entity scale by scale. (Chapter I.1)

After defrauding Twango of a substantial sum, only to be double-crossed by Yelleg and Malser, Twango's "scale divers", Cugel absconds from Flutic, still in possession of the Skybreak Spatterlight. At the nearby port of Saskervoy he takes employment as a lowly worminger (a crew member responsible for the maintenance of huge marine worms) aboard the worm-propelled Galante, a merchant ship owned by Soldinck and Mercantides, hoping to reach Almery by sea. On the island of Lausicaa, where he is to be replaced by a more competent worminger and thus remain stranded, Cugel hijacks the Galante, kidnapping Soldinck's wife and three comely daughters. Madame Soldinck, to whom Cugel naively entrusts the duties of night helmsman, outwits her captor by turning the ship in the opposite direction every night while Cugel is asleep after dallying with her daughters. To evade retribution at the hands of Master Soldinck, who is pursuing the Galante in a lubberly cog, Cugel runs the ship aground on the Tustvold mud flats and wades ashore. (Chapters I.2, II.1, II.2, II.3)

At the nearby village of Tustvold he falls in with a quarryman and antiquarian named Nisbet, whose trade is the construction of columns atop which the idle husbands of the industrious village women bask in the rays of the dying sun. The height of the columns is a status symbol and so the village women vie with each other to have Nisbet erect taller and taller columns for their husbands. With the aid of Nisbet's gravity-repellent boot dressing, Cugel comes up with a scheme whereby he surreptitiously removes the bottom segments of every column in order to resell them to the women. The ruse is discovered and he flees the village before the women can lynch him. (Chapter III.1)

Travelling onward, in the countryside between Tustvold and Port Perdusz, Cugel narrowly avoids a sticky end at the manse of Faucelme, a magician who recognises the Skybreak Spatterlight and, when Cugel refuses to part with it, attempts various underhand ways of doing away with its present owner. Arriving at Port Perdusz, Cugel discovers that sea passage to Almery is impossible. Using Nisbet's magical boot dressing to render it immune to gravity, Cugel steals a ship, the Avventura, and joins a caravan led by Varmous. The caravan, towing the Avventura and its "premium" passengers through the air, arrives, after various adventures, in Kaspara Vitatus, the City of Monuments, where the vessel's original owner, Captain Wiskich, and his crew finally catch up with it. (Chapters III.2, IV.1, IV.2)

Cugel flees across a barren waste known as the Pale Rugates and finally comes to the town of Gundar, the site of the last remaining Solar Emosynaries, who stimulate the combustion of the dying sun by projecting the heat of a fire at the solar orb through a contraption made of lenses. Cugel manages to gain employment as a night watchman guarding a caravan conveying seventeen virgins south to the temple city of Lumarth. At Lumarth, however, the College of Thurists discover that only two of the seventeen maidens are still virgins. Obliged to expiate his crime, Cugel is sent down into the depths of the temple of the demon Phampoun. Conversing with Pulsifer, a homunculus growing on the end of Phampoun's tongue, Cugel realises that all those who have preceded him have been eaten, but only after regaling the demon with lurid tales of their misdeeds. By inveiglement, he persuades Pulsifer to visit the upper world. On ascending to the temple above, the gigantic Phampoun, who is violently sensitive to light, awakes and runs amok, demolishing the city. (Chapter V.1)

Cugel escapes by water, down the River Chaim, as far as the Tsombol Marsh. After crossing the Plain of Standing Stones, Cugel rescues a certain Iolo from a pelgrane, only to be caught by a tentacle that emerges from a hole in the ground, a breach into an otherworld created by a magical adjunct worn by the pelgrane. Iolo, more of a swindler even than Cugel, refuses to assist his erstwhile rescuer and composes himself to sleep; during the night Cugel manages to steal Iolo's bagful of dreams and secretes it within the hole into another dimension. In the morning, Iolo releases Cugel from the grip of the tentacle when he promises to help him catch the supposed thief. They travel to Cuirnif, where Iolo had been hoping to exhibit his dream crystals at Duke Orbal's Grand Exposition. Cugel transports the hole to Cuirnif, which he exhibits, giving it the title "Nowhere". However, he is forced to enter his own exhibit in order to retrieve Iolo's bagful of dreams. The dream crystals, contaminated with the alien stuff of the otherworld, cause Duke Orbal violently unpleasant visions when he samples them in order to judge the winner of the Grand Exposition. (Chapter V.2)

Cugel leaves Cuirnif in a hurry. He finally reaches Almery, where Iucounu repeatedly attempts to steal the Skybreak Spatterlight from him, but is thwarted because the scale absorbs all the magical spells aimed at Cugel. Finally, Cugel fools Iucounu, who has clothed himself in the scales of Sadlark ready to become one with the Overworld entity, into touching his forehead with the Skybreak Spatterlight; Iucounu is instantly absorbed, annihilated. The now complete Sadlark attempts to catch Cugel but stumbles into a fountain and the water dissolves the bonds of force linking together his scales. Cugel is left in possession of Iucounu's manse, Pergolo. (Chapters VI.1, VI.2)

=== Chapter headings ===
- I. From Shanglestone Strand to Saskervoy
- 1. Flutic
- 2. The Inn of Blue Lamps
- II. From Saskervoy to the Tustvold Mud Flats
- 1. Aboard the Galante
- 2. Lausicaa
- 3. The Ocean of Sighs
- III. From Tustvold to Port Perdusz
- 1. The Columns
- 2. Faucelme
- IV. From Port Perdusz to Kaspara Vitatus
- 1. On the Docks
- 2. The Caravan
- V. From Kaspara Vitatus to Cuirnif
- 1. The Seventeen Virgins
- 2. The Bagful of Dreams
- VI. From Cuirnif to Pergolo
- 1. The Four Wizards
- 2. Spatterlight

=== Characters ===
- Cugel – Self-styled "the Clever", the novel's picaresque hero – or anti-hero.
- Master Twango – Avaricious owner of the manse Flutic and a dealer in "treasures of the past", chiefly the scales of the Overworld entity Sadlark, which he exhumes, refurbishes, indexes and sells.
- Weamish – Twango's erstwhile majordomo and "supervisor of operations", a post which in fact involves toiling as an ill-paid general dogsbody.
- Gark and Gookin – Grotesque, goblin-like creatures who enforce Twango's orders and keep a tally of the exorbitant charges he levies on his employees.
- Yelleg and Malser – Workmen employed by Twango to dive for Sadlark's scales in the miry pit at Flutic; Cugels mistreatment of them leads to them stealing Cugel's ill-gotten gains, and they begin a new life as dandies in Saskervoy
- Bilberd – The half-witted gardener at Flutic, who subsequently goes into fashion design after appropriating Cugel's hidden stash of valuable scales.
- Master Soldinck – Importer and exporter, shipping agent at Saskervoy, partner of Master Mercantides. Has a strained relationship with his overbearing wife.
- Master Mercantides – Importer and exporter, shipping agent at Saskervoy, partner of Master Soldinck.
- Bunderwal – Hired by Soldinck and Mercantides as supercargo on the Galante, a trickster whose cunning proves superior to Cugel's
- Wagmund – Former worminger on the Galante.
- Drofo – Chief Worminger of the Galante, prone to mystical speechifying about the sea and the worminger's calling.
- Baunt – Captain of the Galante.
- Lankwiler – Worminger on the Galante, whose laziness in his duties causes conflicts on board.
- Pulk – Worminger resident on the island of Lausicaa.
- Fuscule – Worminger resident on Lausicaa, Pulk's nephew and Cugel's intended replacement
- Turlulia – "Formidable and awesome" woman, to whom Soldinck, wishing to explore Lausicaa's unusual sexual customs, falls victim as a result of a trick played on him by Cugel.
- Madame Soldinck – Wife of Master Soldinck, a harridan who ultimately gets the better of Cugel.
- Tabazinth, Meadhre, Salasser – Daughters of Soldinck.
- Nisbet – Quarryman and column-builder to the village of Tustvold.
- Dame Tadouc – Cobbler-woman at Tustvold.
- Dame Sequorce – Ringleader of the Tustvold women who decide to threaten Nisbet with violence in order to make him speed up delivery of column segments.
- Dame Mupo – Recently married woman from Tustvold, who receives a three-segment starter column for her husband from Nisbet and Cugel.
- Dame Petish – Dame Mupo's aunt, who discovers Nisbet and Cugel's fraudulent scheme.
- Faucelme – Magician of evil repute, whose manse lies on the road to Port Perdusz.
- Wiskich – Ship's captain of the Dilk race, owner of the Avventura.
- Master Sabbas – Known as "Sab the Swindler", formerly the owner of a draying business, now senile, his exploits are viewed with kind amusement by the natives of Port Perdusz; masquerading as a ticket agent, he cheats Cugel of all his money. As his ticket is neither honored nor refunded, Cugel steals the "Avventura" to continue his return home as its "Captain".
- Varmous – Caravan master who plies the route from Port Perdusz to Kaspara Vitatus.
- Nissifer – Passenger aboard the Avventura, in fact a hybrid of bazil and sime, disguised as a middle-aged woman. She is unsociable, especially to Ermaulde and Ivanello.
- Ermaulde – Plump, voluble woman, passenger aboard the Avventura, devoured by Nissifer.
- Gaulph Rabi – Ecclesiarch and pantologist, passenger aboard the Avventura.
- Ivanello – Handsome young dandy, passenger aboard the Avventura, devoured by Nissifer.
- Clissum – Aesthete, author of odes including Gaunt Are the Towers of My Mind, passenger aboard the Avventura.
- Perruquil – Passenger aboard the Avventura, devoured by Nissifer.
- Doctor Lalanke – Wealthy antiquarian, passenger aboard the Avventura. He refuses to assume responsibility for the damage his mimes did to Cugel.
- Sush, Skasja and Rlys – Three "mimes" with silent childlike personalities. They were discovered in an ancient ruin by, and in the charge of, Doctor Lalanke. They throw irreplaceable artifacts, belonging to Cugel, overboard.
- Shilko – Bibulous, garrulous teamster, assigned as lookout to the Avventura.
- Maier – Innkeeper in Gundar.
- Huruska – Nolde of Gundar, intransigent upholder of the Doctrines of the Order of Solar Emosynaries.
- Shimilko – Caravan master entrusted with conveying the Seventeen Virgins to the temple city of Lumarth.
- Chaladet – The Grand Thearch of Lumarth.
- Phampoun – Light-hating demon resident beneath one of the temples of Lumarth.
- Pulsifer – Homunculus growing on the tip of Phampoun's tongue, through which the sleeping Phampoun communicates with his victims.
- Erwig – Impoverished but hospitable native of the village of Samsetiska, who provides Cugel with shelter in his hut.
- Iolo – Dream collector from Lake Let in the Land of Dai-Passant, a character more unscrupulous even than Cugel himself.
- Duke Orbal of Ombalique – ruler of Cuirnif, a connoisseur of marvels.
- Zaraflam – Exhibitor at Duke Orbal's Exposition of Marvels; his exhibit is titled Nimble Squadrons, a military parade of trained cockroaches.
- Bazzard – Son of the Four Wizards; his exhibit, titled Unlikely Musicians, is disqualified from the Exposition of Marvels after his singing fish die when the water drains from their tank.
- Xallops – Exhibits a talking but truculent book, the Compendium of Universal Knowledge, at the Exposition of Marvels.
- Uthaw – Irascible denizen of the otherworld accessible through Cugel's exhibit at the Exposition of Marvels, titled Nowhere.
- The Four Wizards – Disserl, Vasker, Pelesias and Archimbaust, victims of a joke played by Iucounu, they are forced to share a single eye, ear, arm and leg. They form a notably stable alliance with the usually treacherous Cugel.
- Lorgan – Bibulous dealer in fancy embroideries, guest at the Inn of Five Flags in the village Flath Foiry.
- Iucounu – Nicknamed the Laughing Magician, and Cugel's arch-enemy. Iucouno is not only sadistic but considered petty and vain even by the standards set by his fellow mages, an extremely dangerous combination for those around him. He is known to send out familiars to listen for gossip about himself, and punishes those whom he finds are not speaking highly of him.
- Sadlark – a "Demiurge" entity of the Overworld, who split into his component parts during a great battle with the Underworld entity Unda-Hrada. This is the same battle from whence the "Eyes of the Overworld" come.

== Themes ==
=== The sea voyage ===
Chapter II of Cugel's Saga, "From Saskervoy to the Tustvold Mud Flats", with three sub-chapters: "Aboard the Galante", "Lausicaa" and "The Ocean of Sighs", is structured around one of Vance's favourite narrative themes: description of a voyage by sailing ship. The theme can also be found in Servants of the Wankh (1969), The Pnume (1970), Maske: Thaery (1976), Showboat World (1975), and Lyonesse (1983). Variants of the same theme are the overland sailing wagons of the Wind-runners of the Palga plateau in The Gray Prince (1974) and, in Cugel's Saga, the ship that is towed through the air in chapter IV.2 "The Caravan" after being magically charged with Cugel's gravity-repellent boot dressing.

=== Otherworlds ===
Another significant recurring theme in the work of Jack Vance also to be found in Cugel's Saga is that of the "otherworld". In "The Bagful of Dreams" (chapter V.2) a magical blue egg worn by a pelgrane around its neck shatters on the ground creating a portal into an otherworld, which turns out to be an interminable region of undulating "black spongy stuff" whose sole inhabitant is an irascible, gelatinous, tentacular hulk named Uthaw. Similarly, in The Green Pearl, a large part of the narrative is set in the otherworld of Tanjecterly, which Visbhume tricks Glyneth into entering via a hut in the Forest of Tantrevalles. Twitten's Almanack, part of Vance's Lyonesse mythos, describes a number of such otherworlds, of which only Tanjecterly will support human life: Paador, Nith, and Woon; Hidmarth and Skurre, which are "purulent places infested with demons"; Cheng, which might be home to the sandestins; Pthopus, which is a "single torpid soul", and Underwood, which is "empty save for a moaning sound." In "The Seventeen Virgins" (chapter V.1), Cugel enters a subworld, or "demon-realm", inhabited by the photophobic demonic deity Phampoun, who communicates via a homuncular excrescence on the end of his tongue. The narrative device of the journey into the demon subworld is employed at far greater length in Michael Shea's sequel/homage to The Eyes of the Overworld, A Quest for Simbilis (1974), and in his novellas "Come Then Mortal, We Shall Seek Her Soul" and "The Fishing of the Demon Sea", which form part of Nifft the Lean (1982). The subworld theme is also present in one of Vance's earliest Dying Earth tales, "Guyal of Sfere" in The Dying Earth (1950), in which the demon-lord Blikdak creates a breach in the vast underground Museum of Man as he tries to rise up from his own subjacent infernal realm.

=== The Skybreak Spatterlight ===
At the beginning of Cugel's Saga the eponymous hero takes employment at Flutic, a manse in the land of Cutz, where an archaeological operation is underway to recover the constituent scales of an Overworld entity named Sadlark. During the Eighteenth Aeon, a demon by the name of Underherd is said to have "interfered with the overworld", and Sadlark, in trying to set matters right, plunged into the miry pit now found at the back of Flutic, where he became "disassociated". Master Twango, the owner of Flutic, deals in the scales, selling them to the firm of Soldinck and Mercantides, whose end customer is Iucounu the Laughing Magician. Iucounu, believing himself to be Sadlark's avatar, is in the process of reassembling the Overworld entity, with which he intends to merge himself. Twango's basic reference work on Sadlark's scales is Haruviot's Intimate Anatomy of Several Overworld Personages, which allows him to classify them as "ordinaries" or "specials". The latter, possessing a greater charge of Overworld force, are astringent to the touch. Examples of specials are Clover-leaf Femurials, Dorsal Double Luminants, Interlocking Sequalions, Lateral Flashers, Juncture Spikes, the Turret Frontal Lapidative and the Malar Astrangal, which fits over the elbow part of Sadlark's third arm.

The most valuable and potent scale of all is the Pectoral Skybreak Spatterlight, or "protonastic centrum", whose very touch is deadly, absorbing any living creature with which it comes into contact. Iucounu describes it as follows: "The protonastic centrum is the node which binds the other scales with lines of force. This node is the soul and force of Sadlark. With the node in place, Sadlark lives once again; indeed Sadlark was never dead, but merely disassociated" (Chapter VI.2). Through sheer luck, Cugel obtains the Skybreak Spatterlight from the mire at Flutic, and the scale is the weapon whereby he ultimately defeats his arch-enemy, Iucounu. The Skybreak Spatterlight is central to the plot at a number of points, for example, during Cugel's encounter with the magician Faucelme. It is also by means of the Skybreak Spatterlight that Cugel is able to defeat Nissifer, the monstrous insectoid hybrid of sime and bazil that preys on the passengers of the Avventura. The Skybreak Spatterlight lends an overarching unity to the separate picaresque episodes of Cugel's Saga, with the exception of the chapters "The Seventeen Virgins" and "The Bagful of Dreams", which were written and published earlier than the rest of the book and in which Sadlark's protonastic centrum is not mentioned.

=== Fantastic ethnologies ===
One of the defining features of Jack Vance's work is his invention of fictional ethnologies, which encompass culinary, sartorial, marital, economic, architectural, musical, jurisprudential, social etc. customs and practices, as well as, in many cases most importantly, religious beliefs. Significant examples of such fantastic ethnologies in Cugel's Saga are the cultures to be found in Lausicaa, Tustvold, Gundar and Lumarth. The island of Lausicaa (chapter II.2) is notable for its matriarchal social system, which requires that all adult males go "under the veil". At Tustvold (chapter III.1), the women practise trades (cobbler, tanner, butcher etc.), while their husbands pass their time as idle stylites, basking atop columns in the health-giving rays of the dying sun. The height of a husband's column is an index of the wife's position in the social hierarchy. The description of Gundar (chapter V.1) provides a fuller ethnology, including aspects such as architecture and costume, as well as their historical/mythical rationale. Gundar is the last isolated outpost of the Order of Solar Emosynaries, who believe that by focusing the heat of a fire on the solar disk by means of a complicated contraption of lenses they prevent the dying sun from being extinguished. The natives of Lumarth (chapter V.1) are demon-worshippers who hypocritically justify their religious practices using an elaborate doctrine of altruism and benevolence.

== Publication history ==
The two separate sections that make up chapter V of Cugel's Saga were published and, it may be assumed, written a number of years prior to the rest of the book. Unlike The Eyes of the Overworld, Cugel's Saga is therefore only partially a "fix-up". "The Seventeen Virgins", chapter V.1, was first published in the October 1974 issue of The Magazine of Fantasy and Science Fiction, almost a decade before the first edition of the complete novel. "The Bagful of Dreams", chapter V.2, was included in Flashing Swords! 4: Barbarians and Black Magicians (Nelson Doubleday, 1977), edited by Lin Carter, a fantasy collection that also featured work by Poul Anderson, Rik Bryant, John Jakes, Katherine Kurtz and Michael Moorcock.

The first U.S. edition was published in 1983 by Timescape Books. The first U.K. edition was published by Panther/Granada in 1985 and reprinted the following year by Grafton.

A second U.S. edition was published by Underwood–Miller, in a print run of 550 signed and numbered copies and featuring artwork by Stephen Fabian, eight months after the original hardcover edition. The final book in the Dying Earth series, Rhialto the Marvellous (1984), was likewise published in a special edition by Brandywyne Books, "slipcased, signed and limited to 1000 copies" and also featuring artwork by Stephen Fabian, but this time preceded the Timescape hardcover edition by three months.

In 1999, the Science Fiction Book Club published The Compleat Dying Earth, comprising all four books in the Dying Earth series. A second omnibus including Cugel's Saga, with the title Tales of the Dying Earth, was published by Gollancz in 2000, as no. 4 in its Fantasy Masterworks series.

In 2005, Cugel's Saga was republished under the author's preferred title, Cugel: The Skybreak Spatterlight, as volume 35 in the 44-volume Vance Integral Edition.

=== Textual variants ===
The first six paragraphs of the short story "The Seventeen Virgins" published in The Magazine of Fantasy and Science Fiction (October 1974) differ substantially from the chapter of the same title published in Cugel's Saga (1983) in style, content and the characterisation of Cugel. In the earlier version of the text, Cugel is said to have "made a hasty departure" from a place called Julle, where he suffered "indignities" at the hands of his enemies, but also managed to cause them "confusion." In the later version, Cugel has fled from Kaspara Vitatus, at the end of the preceding chapter ("The Caravan"), and the opening two paragraphs cursorily narrate how he baffles the pursuit and then, emerging from hiding, shakes his fist and shouts curses after the distant figures of the angry mob as they return to town. Where the later version briefly narrates Cugel's journey across the wilderness known as the Pale Rugates without any indication as to his inner state - he is described merely as marching for an unspecified number of days, eating "ramp, burdock, squallix and an occasional newt" to fend off starvation - the earlier version explores Cugel's affective reactions to his environment and situation, for example: "The breadth of the sky exalted his soul; the emptiness of the far distances caused him fatigue and despondency." Similarly, in a "spasm of self-assertion", Cugel delivers the following soliloquy in the first version:

"Hear me, all who detect sound, in every realm of the living world! I am Cugel, Cugel the Clever! My courage and resource, my cunning and craft are notorious! I am not to be trifled with!"

A comparison of the following paragraph in its two variants will serve to show how in the later version Vance has honed his prose style, paring away redundant adverbs, descriptive language and psychological details:

On the afternoon of the seventh day Cugel limped down a slope into an ancient orchard, long abandoned. A few withered hag-apples clung to the limbs; these Cugel avidly devoured. Then, discerning the trace of an old road, he set off buoyed by the conviction that the Pale Rugates lay behind him.
On the afternoon of the seventh day Cugel limped down a slope into an ancient orchard. Cugel found and devoured a few withered hag-apples, then set off along the track of an old road.

== Reception ==
Algis Budrys noted that "Vance holds and holds you with various devices while you are gradually coming to know and appreciate his unlovable hero."

== Sources ==
- Chalker, Jack L.; Mark Owings (1998). The Science-Fantasy Publishers: A Bibliographic History, 1923-1998. Westminster, MD and Baltimore: Mirage Press, Ltd. p. 669.
- Vance, Jack (1984). Cugel's Saga. Pocket Books. ISBN 0-671-46499-X.
