= J. J. Lee =

J.J. or JJ Lee may refer to:

- J. J. Lee (historian), Irish historian
- JJ Lee (writer), Canadian writer and journalist
