= The Merman's Children =

1979 book by Poul Anderson

- Cover of the first edition
- Author: Poul Anderson
- Cover artist: Jose Cruz
- Language: English
- Genre: Fantasy
- Publisher: Berkley/Putnam
- Publication date: 1979
- Publication place: United States
- Media type: Print (Hardcover)
- Pages: 319
- ISBN: 0-399-12375-X

The Merman's Children is a 1979 fantasy novel by American writer Poul Anderson, inspired by legends of Mermen and Mermaids from Danish folklore, in particular the ballad Agnete og Havmanden. Set at the end of the medieval era, The Merman's Children details the Faery peoples being displaced by the advancing tide of Christianity.

== Plot summary ==
The city of Liri, ruled by King Vanimen, lies beneath the waves off the shores of Denmark and peacefully coexists with the landbound humans. Vanimen was once married to a human woman, Agnete, until she returned to land; their four halfling children are Tauno, Eyjan, Kennin, and Yria.

A zealous new archdeacon gets permission from the bishop to perform an exorcism that will drive the soulless merfolk away. Upon the exorcism, an earthquake destroys Liri, and a bright light and deafening sound force the merfolk to flee with only what they can carry. The king's halfling children are the only ones unaffected, and Tauno stays to wait for his younger siblings, who are away from the city at the time. The four plan to track down the other merfolk, but they decide to leave the youngest and most vulnerable, Yria, on land with a kindly priest. However, the priest christens Yria, and she gains an immortal soul and loses all memory of her previous existence. Now known as Margrete, she does not recognize her siblings and is terrified of them.

Learning that Margrete is to be sent into a convent, the older three halflings decide to find enough money to provide other options for her. They hire a crew and sail in search of a sunken city filled with treasure. Aiding them are Ingeborg, a prostitute who is in love with Tauno, and Niels, a young sailor who falls for Eyjan, but tensions with the rest of the crew are high. After the halflings defeat a kraken and retrieve the treasure, the crew betrays them. Kennin is murdered in the fight. Killing the crew and freeing Ingeborg and Niels, Tauno and Eyjan head back to Denmark. A storm affects their journey home, but they are aided by the Great Selkie of Sule Skerry.

Meanwhile, Vanimen leads the merpeople to steal a ship to travel the sea in search of safe waters. The storm blows them far off course, and many die or are badly wounded on the journey. Fleeing pirates, they land in Dalmatia. The local zhupan treats them well but holds them prisoner, unsure whether to trust them. A friendly priest, Father Tomislav, befriends Vanimen and teaches him the language. Vanimen and the merfolk earn acceptance by driving away a murderous vodianoi that had haunted the nearby lake, although Vanimen is unsettled when he encounters a vilja, the ghost of Father Tomislav's daughter who committed suicide. Vanimen gradually accepts that Faery is dying and that the merfolk's best prospect is to assimilate with humans. He is still reluctant to become Christian, knowing that faeries lose their memories when baptized, until Father Tomislav receives a sign from Saint Andrew that the merfolk will be allowed to keep their memories.

Leaving Ingeborg and Niels in Denmark to discreetly sell off the treasure, Tauno and Eyjan set out to search for their people around Greenland. There they hear rumors from the Inuit about an underwater town. They track the rumors to a Norse settler, Haakon Arnorsson, whose group is starving and trapped on land by a tupilak after they slaughtered an Inuit village. The rumors of an underwater town turn out to be false, but Haakon holds Eyjan hostage to force Tauno to help kill the tupilak. Tauno successfully kills the creature, and the repentant Haakon dies of his injuries from the hunt. Tauno and Eyjan inform the Inuit, and the angakok is able to divine that the other merfolk are in Dalmatia. He gives Tauno and Eyjan an amulet which can translate languages but also capture a person's soul.

With the patronage of a bishop, Niels is able to become a wealthy and respected businessman. He and Ingeborg give Margrete her share of the treasure and arrange for her to move out of the convent to an adopted family. Margrete accepts, but still wants nothing to do with her merfolk siblings.

Tauno and Eyjan travel to Dalmatia, where they discover the merfolk fully integrated with humans and living as devout Christians. Vanimen, now known as Andrei, has become a Navy captain. Disturbed by the changes in their personalities and the loss of their culture, Tauno takes refuge in the forest with Nada the vilja. He falls in love with her, but due to her undead nature, they can't be together or he'll die.

After speaking with Andrei, Eyjan chooses to be baptized, takes the name Dagmar, and returns to Denmark to marry Niels. Nada enters the amulet in order to stay with Tauno. He accompanies Dagmar to Denmark and bids her goodbye, feeling that his sister is gone forever. He reunites with Ingeborg and tells her about his journeys and about Nada. He reveals to the horrified Ingeborg that Nada can merge souls with whoever holds the amulet, and he plans to do so and give up his identity in order to be with her. While he sleeps, Ingeborg takes the amulet and merges with Nada herself, giving up Christian salvation in order to become faery and spend an immortal life with Tauno. Later, as they bid farewell to Dagmar, Ingeborg asks permission to take the name Eyjan, which Dagmar grants and they embrace. In an epilogue years later, Father Tomislav preaches uncertainly but hopefully on God's love to his congregation of humans and former merfolk, who have suffered through the realities of war in Dalmatia.

== Publication ==
Portions of the work had previously been published as an identically titled novella and the novelette "The Tupilak" in the anthologies Flashing Swords! #1 (1973) and Flashing Swords! #4: Barbarians and Black Magicians (1977). The complete novel was first published by hardcover by Berkley/Putnam in September 1979, which also issued two later editions, a Science Fiction Book Club hardcover edition in February 1980 and a paperback edition in October 1980. The first British editions were issued in 1981 by Sphere Books (paperback) and Sidgwick & Jackson (hardcover). It was also included in the Sidgwick & Jackson omnibus Science Fiction Special 44 in 1983.

== Reception ==
The book received fifth place in the polling for the 1980 Locus Award for Best Fantasy Novel.
