= The Slayers d20 =

Tabletop role-playing game

The Slayers d20 cover art

The Slayers d20 Role-Playing Game is a 2003 role-playing game published by Guardians of Order based on the anime series Slayers. The title refers to the title under which Central Park Media released the three seasons of the television series.

The Slayers d20 (ISBN 189452585X) was designed by Michelle Lyons, David Lyons, Jeff Mackintosh and Anthony Ragan, featuring art by Jeff Mackintosh. It was nominated for the 2004 ENnies in the category Best Licensed Product.

The game uses the d20 System with a variant magic system designed to reflect the powerful spells found in the series. Players' characters in this setting are frequently at a much higher level than in a typical d20 campaign. The game has no reference to any material found in the movies or OVA episodes due to licensing restrictions, thus there is no mention of the popular character Naga the Serpent. However, there are multiple sets of game statistics for the four principals of the TV series, to reflect their advancement over the course of the story.

The book was scheduled to go out of print in 2006, as Guardians of Order's license to publish Slayers material expires. No renewal was planned, especially since CPM itself has been displaced as the license holder for Slayers in favor of FUNimation, which has a substantial collectible card game division of its own. Much of Slayers material was incorporated into Advanced d20 Magic, a setting-independent book that continued to be in print after the license on Slayers expired.

== Reviews ==
- Backstab #49
