= A World of Difference (novel) =

1990 science fiction novel by Harry Turtledove

- First edition cover
- Author: Harry Turtledove
- Cover artist: David Schleinkofer
- Language: English
- Genre: Science fiction
- Publisher: Del Rey Books
- Publication date: May 1990
- Publication place: United States
- Media type: Print (Mass Market Paperback)
- Pages: 308
- ISBN: 0-345-36076-1
- OCLC: 21509455

A World of Difference is a 1990 science fiction novel by American writer Harry Turtledove.

The book begins with a space voyage that departed Earth in an alternate 1989. In the universe of the book, the fourth planet from the Sun, in the orbit occupied by Mars in our reality, is named Minerva, which is similar in size and makeup to Earth. The book contrasts Earth's culture during the ongoing Cold War with Minerva's feudal culture which resembles the European culture of the Late Middle Ages. Mercantilism is just emerging in Minerva during the events of the book.

== Plot summary ==
When the Viking 1 space probe lands on Minerva in 1976 it takes a picture of a native Minervan wielding a primitive tool, thus proving the existence of intelligent life on other worlds.

The main action of the story involves separate American and Soviet missions, who both pay lip service to non-interference with Minervan society, but in the course of their research, the teams' respective political ideologies inevitably come to the fore. This leads the teams and their commanders back home to use the Minervans in a transparent analogy to Third World/Cold War proxy conflicts on Earth. One of the Americans saves the life of a female Minervan after she gives birth. Eventually Minervans get their hands on high tech items like steel hatchets, rubber rafts, and finally AK-74s, which severely disrupt their way of life.

== The planet Minerva ==
Minerva has an atmosphere similar to Earth's and breathable by humans, and liquid water exists in significant quantities on the surface. The planet's mean atmospheric temperature is lower than Earth's due to the greater distance from the Sun, although the greenhouse effect of its thicker atmosphere means that it is not as cold as our universe's Mars. The ancient astronomers of the novel name the bright blue/gray planet Minerva after the goddess of wisdom.

== Minervan biology and society ==
Minervan animals (including the sentient Minervans) are hexameristically radially symmetrical. This means that they have six eyes spaced equally all around, see in all directions and have no "back" where somebody could sneak up on them unnoticed. The different way that Minervans perceive their environment, and its major influence on their culture and way of life, is a significant plot element – especially important in the battle scenes towards the end.

Females (referred to as "mates" by the Minervans) give birth to litters that consist of one male and five females. The "mates" always die after reproduction from torrential bleeding where the six fetuses were attached; this gives a population multiplication of 5 per generation if all females live to adolescence and reproduce. Females reach puberty while immediately after childhood and typically experience sex only once in their lifetime – leading to pregnancy and death at birth-giving.

Thus, in Minervan society male dominance seems truly determined by a biological imperative, though it takes different forms in various Minervan societies: in some, females are considered expendable and traded as property, in others they are cherished and their tragic fate mourned, but still their dependant status is taken for granted.

== Earth ==
In addition to the existence of Minerva the book alludes to a variety of subtle differences between its history and ours. The fact that the fourth planet was blue rather than red as in our universe, and named for a different deity of the Classical pantheon, did not significantly change life on Earth. Galileo is mentioned as having seen Minerva in his telescope and made the first drawing of its surface; this did not, however, make his general career significantly different from in our timeline.

However, fundamental differences seem to have started to develop since the mid-1970s. Following the discovery of intelligent life on Minerva, both superpowers engaged energetically on efforts to launch a crewed spacecraft there. This led to an increase in tensions between different governments.

== Allusions to other works ==
The Georgian member of the Soviet crew, who has some frictions with his Russian crewmates due to cultural differences, is named "Shota Rustaveli" after the 12th century poet Shota Rustaveli.

== Publication history ==
A World of Difference has been published in hardcover in Great Britain by Hodder & Stoughton.

=== Translations ===
- Italian: Missione su Minerva (Mission to Minerva) (transl. by Carlo Borriello) Fanucci Editore, 2000.
- Russian: Битва в космосе (A Space Battle) (transl. by G.A. Il'insky) Rusich, 1997, ISBN 5-88590-654-8.

== See also ==
- Barsoom
- The Sky People
- In the Courts of the Crimson Kings
- Old Mars
- Hard to Be a God
