= The Sky People =

2006 novel by S. M. Stirling

- First edition
- Author: S. M. Stirling
- Cover artist: Gregory Manchess
- Language: English
- Genre: alternate history
- Publisher: Tor Books
- Publication date: November 2006
- Publication place: United States
- Media type: Print
- Pages: 304 (hardcover)
- ISBN: 978-0-7653-1488-8
- OCLC: 64289092
- Dewey Decimal: 813/.54 22
- LC Class: PS3569.T543 S59 2006
- Followed by: In the Courts of the Crimson Kings

The Sky People is an alternate history science fiction novel by American writer S. M. Stirling. It was first published by Tor Books in hardcover in November 2006, with a book club edition co-published with the Science Fiction Book Club following in December of the same year. Tor issued paperback, ebook, and trade paperback editions in October 2007, April 2010, and May 2010 respectively. Audiobook editions were published by Tantor Media in January 2007.

The book takes place on Venus in an alternate Solar System in which probes from the United States and the Soviet Union find intelligent life and civilizations on both Venus and Mars. The book is heavily influenced by the works of writers such as Ray Bradbury, Edgar Rice Burroughs, Arthur C. Clarke, and Larry Niven. The sequel, In the Courts of the Crimson Kings, is set on Mars.

== Plot summary ==
In an alternate universe, life exists on Venus and Mars. Because of the discovery, the United States and the Soviet Union have poured all of their resources into space exploration and sent their best and brightest to colonize Venus and Mars. Although there have been a few outbreaks of hostilities on Earth, an uneasy détente exists in space between the Americans and the Soviets, who are struggling for supremacy and supported by their respective allies. The European Union is also anxious not to be excluded from the neocolonial race but is far behind the other powers.

In 1962, the Soviets drop planetary probes on Venus and discover people, both humans and Neanderthals, on the planet. Crewed flights by the Soviets and later by the Americans establish bases on the planet (the American one is named Jamestown, the Soviet one Cosmograd) and find other familiar species, including dinosaurs. Both fauna and flora are strangely similar to those from Earth's past.

In 1988, Lieutenant Marc Vitrac, a Ranger in the US Aerospace Force, has been on the planet for a year. Born in a Cajun family amidst the Louisiana bayous, his primary function is exploration of the vast wild lands, but at the beginning of the novel, he is tapped to welcome newcomers to the colony.

The new arrivals are somewhat taken back by the ceratopsia used as a shuttle bus. The dinosaur has been "iced" by the insertion of an Internal Control Device into its brain, which allows the creature to be controlled with messages sent directly to the brain.

The new arrivals include Cynthia Whitlock, a young African-American specialist, and Wing Commander Christopher Blair, a supposedly-British linguist. As with all the Terrans on the planet, Cynthia and Blair also have other skills. Blair spends most of his time in the nearby town of Kartahown and extends their knowledge of one of the native languages.

As the story progresses, many of the characters comment about how similarly evolution has progressed on Venus and on Earth. Naturally, the scientists at the Jamestown base are puzzled by the seeming parallelisms of evolution. Although the base has no means to check DNA (as in the alternate timeline, most research funding has been spent on space travel), other tests indicate that the natives are closely related to Terrans. The fossil record is very spotty, with occasional infusions of new species, but no one has an explanation as to why there are humans and other Earth animals and plants on Venus.

On another part of Venus, an unknown external force interferes with the computer on a Soviet shuttle and causes it to crash-land into the unexplored wild lands. The Soviets ask for American assistance to recover the crew. The airship Vepaja, with Captain Tyler commanding, is selected for the rescue attempt, and Marc, Cynthia, and Chris are chosen as the crew. Jadviga Binkis, the wife of the Soviet shuttle commander, is also included in the crew. Marc also takes his Epicyon pup, Tahyo, with them.

The weather, animals, mechanical failure, and sabotage from an unknown enemy eventually force the group to abandon the airship. Once it arrives at its destination, it finds itself in the midst of a civil war between the very-human Cloud Mountain People and the Neanderthals. Additionally, an alien AI is annoyed at the Terrans for interfering with the Venusians. The AI is sapient but not sentient and can control both Homo sapiens and Homo neanderthalensis within a short range. Unsure what to do, the AI calls for its creator race to return. Additionally, Blair discovers that the Cloud People speak a Proto-Indo-European language, which indicates that the creator race has taken Homo sapiens from earth and seeded them on Venus within the last several thousand years. The group sides with the Cloud Mountain People, since Marc has fallen in love with their princess, and helps them defeat the Neanderthals. The Cloud Mountain People's lands are destroyed, however, by a biological weapon on board the downed Soviet shuttle. Marc thus leads the Cloud Mountain People on a five thousand mile overland journey back to Jamestown to settle around the base and brings with him an alien artifact, which may be evidence of the alien race that brought life to Venus and Mars.

== Reception ==
In a praiseworthy review, Publishers Weekly highly commended the author for utilizing old-fashioned literary tropes, like the native princess who has magical powers, all while avoiding genre pitfalls and stereotyping the multicultural atmosphere of the novel. They also called the scientific elements "refreshingly realistic" and predicted that "readers will eagerly anticipate a trip to Mars in the sequel."

Moreover, Kirkus gushed over the author by stating that the novel "offers an easygoing, atmospheric tale airbrushed with fuzzy political overtones, along with a good bit of humor and lively characterization."

== See also ==
- Old Venus
- A World of Difference
