= Pulp Literature Press =

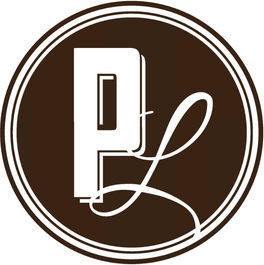
- Pulp Literature Logo
- Founding Editors: Jennifer Landels; Mel Anastasiou; Susan Pieters
- Categories: Canadian Fiction; Genre Fiction; Literary Fiction
- Frequency: Quarterly
- Format: Print; Digital
- Founded: 2013
- Country: Canada
- Based in: Richmond, British Columbia
- Language: English
- Website: https://pulpliterature.com
- ISSN: 2292-2164

Pulp Literature Press is a Canadian-based small press founded in Richmond, BC in 2013. The primary work of the press is the publication of the quarterly literary journal, Pulp Literature. In 2016, the press expanded into publishing writing guides, and added full-length novels in 2017.

== Publications ==
=== Pulp Literature ===
Pulp Literature Issue 16, Autumn 2017

Pulp Literature is a Canadian quarterly literary journal that features the work of emerging and established writers. Launched in Richmond, BC in 2013, Pulp Literature publishes and promotes short fiction, poetry, art (including graphic novel short stories), and feature interviews. The journal has an affirmative action policy for submissions and publishes at least 75% Canadian content. Pulp Literature is distributed in print and electronic format throughout Canada, and to an international readership.

- 2014 - Issues 1-4
- 2015 - Issues 5-8
- 2016 - Issues 9-12
- 2017 - Issues 13-16
- 2018 - Issues 17-20
- 2019 - Issues 21-24
- 2020 - Issues 25-28
- 2021 - Issues 29-32
- 2022 - Issues 33-36
- 2023 - Issues 37-40
- 2024 - Issues 41-44
- 2025 - Issues 45-48

==== History ====
In 2013, Pulp Literature magazine was founded on Bowen Island. The journal's title came from the founding editors’ taste for great storytelling in genre fiction. The word 'Pulp' is an homage to pulp publications such as The Magazine of Fantasy & Science Fiction, Analog, Ellery Queen, etc., while ‘Literature’ represents the ideal of narrative quality.

==== Notable contributors ====
Each issue features a story from a well-known author writing outside their usual genres. These include C.C. Humphreys, JJ Lee (writer), Joan MacLeod, Susanna Kearsley, George McWhirter, Matt Hughes, Eileen Kernaghan, Robert J. Sawyer, Carol Berg, Brenda Carre, Bob Thurber, Matthew Hooton, Genni Gunn, Kristene Perron, Robert Silverberg, Kelly Robson, A.M. Dellamonica, Tomson Highway, Kate Heartfield, Renée Sarojini Saklikar, Shashi Bhat, Dan MacIsaac, James Sallis, Richard Thomas, Claire Humphreys, Finnian Burnett, and Leo X Robertson.

=== Novels ===
2017

- Stella Ryman and the Fairmount Manor Mysteries by Mel Anastasiou
- Allaigna’s Song: Overture by JM Landels

2019

- Advent by Michael Kamakana
- The Labours of Mrs Stella Ryman: Further Fairmount Manor Mysteries by Mel Anastasiou
- What the Wind Brings by Matthew Hughes

2020

- Allaigna's Song: Aria by JM Landels

2022

- The Extra: A Monument Studios Mystery by Mel Anastasiou
- Allaigna's Song: Chorale by JM Landels

2025

- Barhopping for Astronauts: Cosmic Horror, Late-Stage Capitalism, and Other Light Reading by Leo X Robertson
- Stella Ryman and the Search for Thelma Hu by Mel Anastasiou

=== Writing Guides et al. ===
2016

- Colouring Paradise: A Renaissance-Inspired Colouring Book by Mel Anastasiou
- The Writer’s Boon Companion: Thirty Days Towards an Extraordinary Volume by Mel Anastasiou

2018

- The Writer’s Friend & Confidante by Mel Anastasiou

== Writing contests ==
Pulp Literature runs six annual contests for fiction and poetry that provide cash prizes up to $500 and publication for the winners. Judges for these contests have included George McWhirter, C.C. Humphreys, JJ Lee, Bob Thurber, Brenda Carre, Diane Tucker, Renée Sarojini Saklikar, Leo X Robertson, Jude Neale, Kelly Robson, and Finnian Burnett.

- The Bumblebee Flash Fiction Contest (originally the Bumblebee Microfiction Award) - est 2015
- The Magpie Award for Poetry - est 2014
- The Hummingbird Flash Fiction Prize - est 2014
- The Raven Short Story Contest (originally the Raven Cover Story Contest) - est 2015

Raven Winners

- 2023 EC Dorgan for ‘Flehmen Grimace’
- 2022 Cate Sandilands for ‘Revolutions’
- 2021 Laura Kuhlmann for ‘A Jar of Marmalade’
- 2020 Nancy Ludmerer for ‘Good Intentions’
- 2019 Michael Donoghue for ‘Life4Sale’
- 2018 Cheryl Wollner for ‘Girls Who Dance in the Flames’
- 2017 Elaine McDivitt for ‘The Tape’
- 2016 Pat Flewwelling for ‘The Handler’
- 2015 Emily Linstrom for ‘Black Blizzard’

- The First Page Cage Contest - est 2023
- The Kingfisher Poetry Prize - est 2023
