= In the Courts of the Crimson Kings =

2008 novel by S. M. Stirling

- Author: S. M. Stirling
- Cover artist: Gregory Manchess
- Language: English
- Genre: alternate history, science fiction
- Publisher: Tor Books
- Publication date: 2008
- Publication place: United States
- Media type: Print
- Pages: 304 (hardcover)
- ISBN: 978-0-7653-1489-5
- OCLC: 174112805
- Dewey Decimal: 813/.54 22
- LC Class: PS3569.T543 I6 2008
- Preceded by: The Sky People
- Followed by: The Lords of Creation

In the Courts of the Crimson Kings is a 2008 alternate history science fiction novel by American writer S. M. Stirling.

== Plot introduction ==
The story takes place on the planet Mars in an alternate universe solar system in which probes from both the United States and the Soviet Union find intelligent life and civilizations on both Venus and Mars. The book is heavily influenced by the works of writers such as Edgar Rice Burroughs, Ray Bradbury, and Leigh Brackett.

It is a sequel to The Sky People, which is set on Venus. Stirling later wrote a short story prequel, "Sword of Zar-Tu-Kan", which was published in the 2013 anthology Old Mars, edited by George R. R. Martin and Gardner Dozois.

== Plot summary ==
The novel begins with a prologue set at the 20th World Science Fiction Convention (Chicon III) in 1962 at which a large group of famous science fiction authors in attendance are watching a television broadcast of an American space probe as it lands on an inhabited Mars. Those present include Frederik and Carol Pohl, Poul Anderson, H. Beam Piper, Guest of Honor Theodore Sturgeon, Jack Williamson, Robert and Virginia Heinlein, Arthur C. Clarke, Larry Niven, Isaac Asimov, L. Sprague and Catherine Crook de Camp, John W. Campbell, Frank Herbert, and Leigh Brackett. Heinlein mentions an idea for a novel about Mars that he had had but set aside when "the preliminary orbital telescope reports" had come in. (In actual history, the completed book, Stranger in a Strange Land, won the Hugo Award for Best Novel at the convention.) The authors watch and comment as the broadcast from the probe reveals a Martian canal and wildlife and then, startlingly, the arrival of human-like Martians in a "land ship" who haul the probe off.

The main action of the novel commences in 2000, and both the US and the Sino-Soviet "Eastbloc" have bases on the planet. The US has its base off in the wilderness away from the major cities, while the Eastbloc has placed its base inside Olympus Mons, in the remnants of realm of the Tollamune emperor, whose ancient dynasty once ruled all of Mars. Although in decline, Martian civilization is significantly older than Earth's and has considerable expertise in genetic engineering to the point that Martian engines, ranged weapons, and other complex equipment are actually advanced creatures specifically bred and engineered for certain tasks.

The archaeologist Jeremy Wainman is sent by the U.S. Aero-Space Force to explore the lost city of Rema-Dza out in the "Great Beyond," or the Martian desert. The Space Force also hires a female Martian mercenary, Teyud za-Zhalt, who leads the expedition to the city. Fighting a pack of feral engines under the city, Jeremy and Teyud fall in love.

It becomes apparent that there is more to Teyud than initially appears. When the expedition discovers the lost "Invisible Crown" of the Tollamune emperors, a symbol of authority that gives the wearer immense power, everyone is startled to find that Teyud can wear it even though only someone from the Tollamune dynasty can do so. Teyud admits that she is the illegitimate daughter of the current emperor. The former mercenary now commands the power of an ancient technological artifact allegedly created by the aliens that terraformed Mars and Venus and seeded them with life from Earth.

Jeremy and Teyud soon discover that there are Tollamune dynastic factions who know of Teyud's ancestry and are looking to kill or to capture her. Jeremy is captured while he attempts to protect Teyud. That forces her, with the help of her father's soldiers, to attempt to rescue him from the fortress of a potential usurper, who had been displaced from the imperial succession after the emperor recognized his daughter's legitimacy. The crown prince is later defeated after playing a game of Atanj (Martian chess), using people as the pieces, including Teyud and Jeremy. Teyud's father also dies and so passes the title of emperor to her.

With the crown prince dead and a Tollamune once again ruling all of Mars, Teyud takes Jeremy as her prince consort. The couple are visited by an ancient alien computer program, which cryptically announces that they will proceed to the next stage. Both are unsure what that means, but they soon discover that three interplanetary "Gates" have opened up on Earth, Venus and Mars, each leading to another world. The book ends with Teyud and Jeremy visiting "Vow'da" (Moon-World) the new world on the other side of the Martian gate.

== Reception ==
Publishers Weekly called it "charming", and praised Stirling for "successfully creat[ing] a truly alien environment", but criticized his "inclusion of pirates with eye patches, heavily armored guards riding 'fat-tired, self-propelled unicycles' and other moments of near-parody." Kirkus Reviews lauded Stirling's "magnificently wacky Martian biological machines" and "fully developed and carefully crafted social system", calling the book overall an "unexpectedly rich lode of creative ore", and judging it extremely favorably compared to Stirling's previous work.

At the SF Site, Dave Truesdale "heartily recommend(ed)" the book, saying that he could not "think of a better [example]" of planetary romance.

== See also ==
- A World of Difference
