= Mazirian the Magician =

1950 short story by Jack Vance

"Mazirian the Magician" is a sword and sorcery short story by American writer Jack Vance. It was first published in 1950 as part of The Dying Earth, a collection of loosely linked tales. It has been reissued in numerous anthologies since 1965, including The Spell of Seven, edited by L. Sprague de Camp.

== Plot summary ==
Mazirian the Magician paces through his enchanted garden, wrestling with the problem of how to invest the humanoid creatures he has created in vats with intelligence. The secret is held by the sorcerer Turjan, who has kept the secret to himself despite his imprisonment, reduction in size, and torment by a small, vicious dragon.

Mazirian is often visited by a beautiful woman on horseback who always retreats into the forest. Determined to capture her, Mazirian spends one night memorizing five spells: Phandaal's Gyrator, Felojun's Second Hypnotic Spell, The Excellent Prismatic Spray, The Charm of Untiring Nourishment, and the Spell of the Omnipotent Sphere. In this age, such spells that remain to the knowledge of sorcerers are very complex and difficult to memorize, usually disappearing from memory upon use.

The eager magician follows the girl through hills and valleys, chanting numerous spells to avoid the various strange creatures he encounters. These include the Deodand (a flesh-eating mutated man-creature) and Thrang the ghoul-bear.

In due course, he closes upon the girl and is about to capture her - but they are both attacked by deadly vampire grass. As Mazirian, out of spells, struggles drawing the attention of the deadly grass, the girl slowly crawls away, with her life spared, leaving the grass undisturbed. Mazirian frees himself from the grass with a paralysis spell, and is then beaten to death by sentient trees. Battered and barely alive, the woman returns to Mazirian's garden, enters his house, and releases Turjan. It's soon revealed that the girl, known as T'sain, is a creation of Turjan and sacrificed herself to free him out of love. Now released from his enchantment, Turjan carries T'sain's lifeless body away to his vats to recreate her.

== Influence on Dungeons and Dragons ==
Mazirian's need to memorize spells in order to use them became a feature of Dungeons and Dragons. The designer, Gary Gygax, credited the novel with being the inspiration for the magic system, which he called "Vancian". He recognized the need to throttle magic use to keep players on equal footing. The Dying Earth was featured in the Advanced Dungeons & Dragons Dungeon Master’s Guide under Appendix N: Literature as one of the works that were read during the development of the game system.

== Translations ==
- Mazirien la Magiisto Translation into Esperanto under Creative Commons license: EPub, Mobi and PDF
