= Matt Hughes (writer) =

Canadian author (born 1949)

Matthew Hughes
- Matthew Hughes at Dublin 2019 - An Irish Worldcon
- Born: May 1949 (age 77); Liverpool, England
- Occupation: Author
- Writing career
- Language: English
- Period: 1994 – present
- Genres: Fantasy, science fiction, mystery
- Notable works: Archonate series, To Hell and Back, What the Wind Brings
- Website: www.matthewhughes.org

Matthew Hughes (born 1949) is a Canadian author who writes science fiction under the name Matthew Hughes, crime fiction as Matt Hughes and media tie-ins as Hugh Matthews. Prior to his work in fiction, he was a freelance speechwriter. Hughes has written over twenty novels and he is also a prolific author of short fiction whose work has appeared in The Magazine of Fantasy & Science Fiction, Asimov's Science Fiction, Alfred Hitchcock's Mystery Magazine, Lightspeed, Postscripts, Interzone, Pulp Literature, and original anthologies edited by George R. R. Martin and Gardner Dozois. In 2020 he was inducted into the Canadian SF and Fantasy Association Hall of Fame.

== Biography ==
Matthew Hughes was born in Liverpool in May 1949. His family moved to Canada when he was five. As a teenager, he was a member of the Company of Young Canadians and worked a variety of jobs before becoming a journalist. He then moved into speechwriting, first on the staff of the Minister of Justice and the Minister of the Environment and subsequently as a freelance writer for corporate executives and politicians in British Columbia. While working as a speechwriter in 1982, he wrote a 27,000-word novella for a competition which he saw advertised in the Vancouver Sun. Although he did not win the contest, he returned to the story years later and expanded it into his first published novel, Fools Errant, which was released in 1994. Since 2007 he has worked across the world as a housesitter to support his fiction career. He has been married since the late 1960s and has three sons. One of his sons has high-functioning autism, which led Hughes to write the "To Hell and Back" books from the perspective of a high-functioning autistic character.

== Influences ==
Hughes's Archonate stories and novels have been compared to the works of Jack Vance: Booklist called him Vance's "heir apparent" in their August 2005 review of The Gist Hunter and Other Stories. Hughes has written an authorised Dying Earth story ("Grolion of Almery") for the 2009 Vance tribute anthology Songs of the Dying Earth and in February 2020 was working on an authorised sequel to Vance's Demon Princes books, which was published in August 2021 as Barbarians of the Beyond. Hughes has praised Vance as being "a unique voice of genius." However, Hughes has cited his 2008 novel Template as being "the only time I've consciously tried to write a "Jack Vance novel," although the themes and concerns embodied in the story are my own."

Other significant early influences include P. G. Wodehouse, Thorne Smith, L. Sprague de Camp (especially historical novels such as An Elephant for Aristotle), Ray Bradbury, Robert A. Heinlein, Isaac Asimov, Kurt Vonnegut, Joseph Heller and Philip K. Dick. Hughes still rereads Jack Vance, P. G. Wodehouse and Gene Wolfe but has not followed the science fiction and fantasy field since the mid-1980s and instead reads mostly crime fiction by authors such as Lawrence Block, Donald E. Westlake, Robert B. Parker and James Lee Burke, whom Hughes considers to be "the finest American crime novelist of them all."

== Awards and nominations ==
Hughes's work has been shortlisted for numerous major science fiction awards, included the Nebula Award, Philip K. Dick Award, Locus Award, Aurora Award (English-language) and Endeavour Award. In 2000, his story "One More Kill" won the Arthur Ellis Award for Best Crime Short Story presented by the Crime Writers of Canada. In 2020 his contributions to science fiction and fantasy were recognised with the CSFFA Hall of Fame Trophy. What the Wind Brings, a slipstream historical magical realism novel was nominated for the 2020 Neffy Award and won the 2020 Endeavour Award.

== Bibliography ==
=== Archonate series ===
In the far-future setting of Hughes's Archonate stories, the operating principle of the universe changes at intervals of several thousand years between science and magic with catastrophic effects. Science is dominant in stories set in the Penultimate Age of Old Earth and almost all of the characters are initially unaware of or disbelieve in magic: these stories tend towards space opera and planetary romance influenced by Jack Vance and Gene Wolfe. More recently, Hughes has also written stories set during or after the change in the mode of Dying Earth genre. The stories and characters of the Archonate reflect Hughes's interest and passion in crime fiction: he has described himself as "a hard-boiled crime writer working in a science-fictional mode."

==== Filidor Vesh ====
The two Filidor Vesh books follow the picaresque adventures of the title character, nephew and apprentice to the ruling Archon of Old Earth.

- Fools Errant (1994)
  - "From the Discourses and Edifications of Liw Osfeo" (Excerpt and variant of the Liw Osfeo sections from Fools Errant, first published in the limited edition of The Gist Hunter and Other Stories, August 2005)
- Fool Me Twice (2001)
  - Gullible's Travels (SFBC omnibus of Fools Errant and Fool Me Twice, 2001)

==== The Commons ====
The stories concerned with the Commons were originally intended to form one long novel. As this book did not meet the word limits imposed by Tor Books, Hughes published the shortened novel as Black Brillion and turned the excised material into a series of six short stories about Guth Bandar, a scholar dedicated to exploring humanity's collective unconscious. Hughes sold these stories to Gordon Van Gelder at The Magazine of Fantasy & Science Fiction; the first three were collected in 2005 as part of The Gist Hunter and Other Stories and Robert J. Sawyer assembled all six as a fixup novel (titled The Commons) in 2007. In 2014, Hughes self-published the stories as they first appeared in F&SF as The Compleat Guth Bandar: differences between this volume and The Commons are slight. Black Brillion was nominated for the Aurora Award while "The Helper and His Hero" was nominated for the Nebula Award for Best Novella.

- Black Brillion (2004)
- The Commons (2007) (vt. The Compleat Guth Bandar (2014))
  - "A Little Learning" (First published in Fantasy Readers Wanted — Apply Within, October 2003, reprinted in F&SF June 2004)
  - "Inner Huff" (First published in F&SF, February 2005)
  - "Help Wonted" (First published in The Gist Hunter and Other Stories, reprinted in F&SF October–November 2005)
  - "A Herd of Opportunity" (First published in F&SF, May 2006)
  - "Bye the Rules" (First published in F&SF, December 2006)
  - "The Helper and His Hero" (First published in F&SF, February 2007 and March 2007; Nebula Award for Best Novella nominee, 2008)

==== Henghis Hapthorn ====
Henghis Hapthorn is the foremost freelance discriminator of Old Earth in its penultimate age. Hapthorn first appeared in a sequence of six stories sold to The Magazine of Fantasy & Science Fiction, where the arch-rationalist and sceptic discovers to his horror that his rational world is about to come to an abrupt end with the dawn of an age of magic. Hapthorn's story continued in three novels published by Night Shade Books: more recent Hapthorn stories have been set before his first encounter with magic ("The Immersion") or after Hespira ("Fullbrim's Finding", "Hapthorn's Last Case").

- Majestrum (2006)
- The Spiral Labyrinth (2007)
  - "Sweet Trap" (a standalone excerpt of the first two chapters of The Spiral Labyrinth, first published in F&SF, June 2007)
- Hespira (2009)
- 9 Tales of Henghis Hapthorn (2013)
  - "Mastermindless" (First published in F&SF, March 2004)
  - "Relics of the Thim" (First published in F&SF, August 2004)
  - "Falberoth's Ruin" (First published in F&SF, September 2004)
  - "Finding Sajessarian" (First published in F&SF, April 2005)
  - "The Gist Hunter" (First published in F&SF, June 2005)
  - "Thwarting Jabbi Gloond" (First published in F&SF, August 2005)
  - "Sweet Trap" (First published in F&SF, June 2007)
  - "Fullbrim's Finding" (First published in F&SF, July 2008)
  - "The Immersion" (First published in Unfit for Eden: Postscripts 26/27, January 2012)
- "Hapthorn's Last Case" (First published in Lightspeed Magazine, November 2018)

==== Conn Labro and Jenore Mordene ====
Template follows Conn Labro, the star duellist at a gaming house on the planet Thrais, who travels the worlds of the Spray with Old Earth dancer Jenore Mordene to investigate the murder of his only friend on the planet and the mystery of his own origins. Hughes began writing a sequel as a series of eight 10,000 word episodes but after the sale of the first episode to Amazing Stories decided to release the entire story as a novel provisionally titled Passengers and Perils, which will also feature many of Hughes's other recurring characters such as Henghis Hapthorn and Ern Kaslo in supporting roles. Hughes began serialising the novel in April 2022 as a series of Amazon Kindle ebooks, and released the full novel at the end of the month.

- Template (2008)
- Passengers and Perils (2022)
  - "Stopover at Meech's World" (First published in Amazing Stories, Fall 2019)

==== Luff Imbry ====
Luff Imbry is a con man, forger and thief inspired by a pair of Sydney Greenstreet characters, Kaspar Gutman (The Maltese Falcon) and Signor Ferrari (Casablanca). Luff was originally intended only as a supporting character in Black Brillion and was killed off towards the end of the novel in the first draft. Luff was spared in the final book by the intervention of Hughes's editor at Tor, David G. Hartwell and first appeared in a lead role in "The Farouche Assemblage", beginning the character's long association with Postscripts and PS Publishing. The 2011 Luff Imbry novel The Other was nominated for the Philip K. Dick Award. Hughes has called Luff his favourite of his own Archonate characters and has expressed interest in completing the story begun in The Other.

- The Other (2011)
- The Meaning of Luff and Other Stories (2013)
  - "The Meaning of Luff" (First published in F&SF, July 2006)
  - "The Farouche Assemblage" (First published in Postscripts, Spring 2006)
  - "Nature Tale" (First published in Postscripts, Autumn 2006)
  - "Passion Ploy" (First published in Forbidden Planets, November 2006)
  - "The Eye of Vann" (First published in Postscripts, Summer 2008)
  - "Enemy of the Good" (First published in Enemy of the Good: Postscripts 19, October 2009)
  - "Another Day in Fibbery" (First published in Edison's Frankenstein: Postscripts 20/21, December 2009)
  - "Quartet & Triptych" (First published as a standalone novella, August 2010, reprinted in F&SF, November–December 2011)
  - "The Yellow Cabochon" (First published as a standalone novella, January 2012)
- Forays of a Fat Man (2019)
  - "Quartet & Triptych" (First published as a standalone novella, August 2010, reprinted in F&SF, November–December 2011)
  - "The Yellow Cabochon" (First published as a standalone novella, January 2012)
  - "Of Whimsies & Noubles" (First published as a standalone novella, August 2014)
  - "Ephiphanies" (First published as a standalone novella, April 2016)
- "Arboghasz Dal Axander Rides Again" (First published in Mixed Bag, July 2022)
- The One (Sequel to The Other) (2024)

==== The Kaslo Chronicles ====
In the Lightspeed serial "The Kaslo Chronicles", Hughes for the first time showed the apocalyptic moment of transition from the age of rationality to that of magic through the eyes of Erm Kaslo, a confidential operative in the Ten Thousand Worlds whose client, the aristocratic dilettante Diomedo Obron, intends to become a powerful thaumaturge in the new era. Kaslo, by contrast, is a poor fit for the dawning age as his practical competence does not translate to a talent for magic but he nonetheless attempts to salvage what he can and fight back against interplanar threats. After this serial was collected as A Wizard's Henchman in 2016, Hughes returned to the character in prequel stories set when Kaslo was still "a hard-boiled, Sam-Spade-type private eye."

- A Wizard's Henchman (2016)
  - "And Then Some" (First published in Asimov's, February 2013, reprinted in Lightspeed, September 2013)
  - "Sleeper" (First published in Lightspeed, November 2013)
  - "His Elbow, Unkissed" (First published in Lightspeed, January 2014)
  - "Phalloon the Illimitable" (First published in Lightspeed, March 2014)
  - "The Ba of Phalloon" (First published in Lightspeed, May 2014)
  - "A Hole in the World" (First published in Lightspeed, July 2014)
  - "Under the Scab" (First published in Lightspeed, September 2014)
  - "Enter Saunterance" (First published in Lightspeed, November 2014)
  - "The Archon" (First published in Lightspeed, January 2015)
  - "A Face of Black Iron" (First published in Lightspeed, March 2015)
  - "The Blood of a Dragon" (First published in Lightspeed, May 2015)
- "Thunderstone" (First published in Extrasolar, August 2017)
- "Solicited Discordance" (First published in Asimov's, January–February 2018)
- "The Bicolour Spiral" (First published in Pulp Literature, April 2020)

==== Raffalon ====
The character of Raffalon, a skilled but seldom lucky thief in the Dying Earth, was created when George R. R. Martin and Gardner Dozois invited Hughes to submit a story to their anthology Rogues. After writing the first Raffalon story, "The Inn of the Seven Blessings", Hughes realised the potential of the character and went on to write eight more stories about Raffalon's earlier adventures, which he collected in 2017.

- 9 Tales of Raffalon (2017)
  - "Wearaway and Flambeau" (First published in F&SF, July–August 2012)
  - "Stones and Glass" (First published in F&SF, November–December 2013)
  - "The Inn of the Seven Blessings" (First published in Rogues, June 2014)
  - "Avianca's Bezel" (First published in F&SF, September–October 2014)
  - "Prisoner of Pandarius" (First published in F&SF, January–February 2015)
  - "The Curse of the Myrmelon" (First published in F&SF, July–August 2015)
  - "Telltale" (First published in F&SF, January–February 2016)
  - "The Vindicator" (First published in F&SF, November–December 2016)
  - "Sternutative Sortilage" (Original to this collection, reprinted in F&SF, May–June 2019)

==== Baldemar ====
The creation and subsequent development of the Baldemar series is comparable to that of the earlier Raffalon stories. Hughes was invited by Gardner Dozois to submit a story to The Book of Swords: the resulting story, "The Sword of Destiny" introduces Baldemar at the end of his career serving the ambitious but incompetent thaumaturge Thelerion. Subsequent stories have followed Baldemar's life from his streetwise beginnings through the rest of his time as a wizard's henchman.

- Baldemar (2022)
  - "Ten Half-Pennies" (First published in F&SF, March–April 2017)
  - "The Prognosticant" (First published in F&SF, May–June 2017)
  - "The Sword of Destiny" (First published in The Book of Swords, October 2017)
  - "Jewel of the Heart" (First published in F&SF, January–February 2018)
  - "Argent and Sable" (First published in F&SF, May–June 2018)
  - "The Plot Against Fantucco's Armor" (First published in F&SF, March–April 2019)
  - "A Geas of the Purple School" (First published in F&SF, November–December 2019)
  - "Air of the Overworld" (First published in F&SF, January–February 2020)
  - "The Glooms" (First published in F&SF, November–December 2020)
  - "The Cat and the Merrythought" (First published in Shapers of Worlds, Volume II, October 2021)

==== Cascor ====
Cascor, a former policeman turned private detective who covertly practices magic, was originally a supporting character in Hughes's Raffalon stories.

- Cascor (2023)
  - "Stones and Glass" (First published in F&SF, November–December 2013)
  - "Prisoner of Pandarius" (First published in F&SF, January–February 2015)
  - "The Curse of the Myrmelon" (First published in F&SF, July–August 2015)
  - "The Vindicator" (First published in F&SF, November–December 2016)
  - "The Forlorn" (First published in F&SF, September–October 2021)
  - "The Mule" (First published in F&SF, March-April 2022)
  - "The Dire Delusion" (First published in F&SF, May-June 2023)
  - "Armady Dizzerant's Avarice" (Original to this collection)
  - "Tome-Tickler" (Original to this collection)
  - "The Touch" (Original to this collection)

==== Standalone Dying Earth stories ====
Hughes has to date written three standalone short stories and four novels in the same Dying Earth setting as the Raffalon and Baldemar series.

- "The Prevaricator" (First published in F&SF, July–August 2018)
- "The Friends of Masquelayne the Incomparable" (First published in The Book of Magic, October 2018)
- A God in Chains (2019)
- "The Last Legend" (First published in F&SF, March–April 2020)
- The Ghost-Wrangler (2023)
- A God in Hiding (2023)
- Margolyam (2024)

=== To Hell and Back ===
To Hell and Back is a contemporary fantasy trilogy about mild-mannered actuary and superhero fan Chesney Arnstruther, who causes chaos in the spiritual realm when he accidentally summons a demon and refuses to sell his soul. His actions cause Hell to go on strike but also provide Chesney with an opportunity to live out his comic book fantasies.

- The Damned Busters (2011)
  - "Hell of a Fix" (an early version of the first three chapters of The Damned Busters, first published in F&SF, December 2009)
- Costume Not Included (2012)
- Hell to Pay (2013)

=== Demon Princes ===
Hughes's authorised sequel to Jack Vance's Demon Princes quintilogy, Barbarians of the Beyond, was released by Spatterlight Press. The book was published in the "Paladins of Vance" series, a line dedicating to preserving Vance's legacy by permitting authors to create new stories about new characters in Vance's worlds, avoiding the commodified "Frankensteinian reanimation" of characters Hughes criticised in posthumous continuations of series such those by Robert B. Parker. Hence rather than continuing the story of Vance's protagonist Kirth Gersen, Hughes's novel instead focuses on the new character Morwen Sabine, whose parents were enslaved in the Demon Princes' Mount Pleasant Massacre, as she returns to their much changed homeworld seeking a treasure she could use to buy her parents' freedom. The critic James Nicoll positively received the book as a "worthy companion to Vance's series" which was also accessible to readers who hadn't read the original Vance books. An audiobook narrated by Gabrielle de Cuir was released by Skyboat Media in February 2022.

- Barbarians of the Beyond (2021)

=== Standalone novels ===
Hughes has called his magic realist historical novel What the Wind Brings (Pulp Literature Press, 2019) his "magnum opus". It was inspired by a footnote Hughes read in a university textbook in 1971, which described how African slaves shipwrecked on the coast of Ecuador in the mid 16th century created a mixed society with the indigenous peoples and successfully "outfought and out-thought" the conquistadors to gain their independence. Hughes was unable to pursue the idea at the time due to the lack of English-language scholarship but forty years later a Canada Council grant and the increased attention to this passage of history in North America enabled him to complete the book, which received critical acclaim and won the 2020 Endeavour Award.

The 2022 novel Ghost Dreams is a contemporary fantasy story about a commercial burglar who helps the ghost of a woman who died wrongfully confined in an asylum in the 1940s to discover what happened to the child taken from her.

- What the Wind Brings (2019; Endeavour Award winner, 2020)
- The Emir's Falcon (2022; Crime Writers of Canada Awards of Excellence nominee, 2023)
- Ghost Dreams (2022)
- Modie (2023)

=== Collections ===
Stories set in the Archonate are marked with a *:

- The Gist Hunter and Other Stories (2005)
  - "Mastermindless"* (First published in F&SF, March 2004)
  - "Relics of the Thim"* (First published in F&SF, August 2004)
  - "Falberoth's Ruin"* (First published in F&SF, September 2004)
  - "Finding Sajessarian"* (First published in F&SF, April 2005)
  - "The Gist Hunter"* (First published in F&SF, June 2005)
  - "Thwarting Jabbi Gloond"* (First published in F&SF, August 2005)
  - "A Little Learning"* (First published in Fantasy Readers Wanted — Apply Within, October 2003, reprinted in F&SF June 2004)
  - "Inner Huff"* (First published in F&SF, February 2005)
  - "Help Wonted"* (Original to the collection, reprinted in F&SF October–November 2005)
  - "Shadow Man" (Original to the collection, reprinted in F&SF January 2006)
  - "The Devil You Don't" (First published in Asimov's, March 2005)
  - "Go Tell the Phoenicians" (First published in Interzone, #198 May–June 2005)
  - "Bearing Up" (First published in Takes, 1996)
  - "From the Discourses and Edifications of Liw Osfeo"* (Excerpt and variant of the Liw Osfeo sections from Fools Errant, original to the limited edition of this collection)
- Devil or Angel & Other Stories (2015)
  - "Devil or Angel" (First published in F&SF, January–February 2013)
  - "Petri Parousia" (First published in F&SF, February 2008)
  - "The Devil You Don't" (First published in Asimov's, March 2005)
  - "Not a Problem" (First published in Welcome to the Greenhouse, February 2011)
  - "Grolion of Almery" (First published in Songs of the Dying Earth, July 2009)
  - "Timmy, Come Home" (First published in Is Anybody Out There?, June 2010)
  - "Go Tell the Phoenicians" (First published in Interzone, #198 May–June 2005)
  - "The Hat Thing" (First published in Asimov's, September 2004)
  - "Hell of a Fix" (First published in F&SF, December 2009)
  - "Hunchster" (First published in F&SF, August–September 2009)
  - "The Ugly Duckling" (First published in Old Mars, October 2013)
  - "Shadow Man" (First published in The Gist Hunter and Other Stories, August 2005, reprinted in F&SF January 2006)
  - "Widow's Mite" (First published in MinusTides Magazine, 1997)
  - "From the Discourses and Edifications of Liw Osfeo"* (Excerpt and variant of the Liw Osfeo sections from Fools Errant, original to the limited edition of The Gist Hunter and Other Stories, August 2005)
  - "So Loved" (First published in The New and Perfect Man: Postscripts 24/25, March 2011)
  - "Ant Lion" (Original to this collection, to be reprinted in Trees, 2022)
- Mixed Bag (2022)
  - "The Friends of Masquelayne the Incomparable"* (First published in The Book of Magic, October 2018)
  - "The Gift of Gabby" (First published in Welcome to Pacific City, December 2018)
  - "Thunderstone"* (First published in Extrasolar, August 2017)
  - "Mean Mr. Mustard" (First published in Storyteller, Winter 2003)
  - "Loser" (First published in Welcome to Dystopia, December 2017)
  - "Greeves and the Evening Star" (First published in Old Venus, March 2015)
  - "The Prevaricator"* (First published in F&SF, July–August 2018)
  - "Hapthorn's Last Case"* (First published in Lightspeed Magazine, November 2018)
  - "The Bicolour Spiral"* (First published in Pulp Literature, April 2020)
  - "Arboghasz Dal Axander Rides Again"* (First published in Mixed Bag, July 2022)
  - "Awakening" (Original to this collection)

=== Uncollected short fiction ===
- "Forest of Shadows" (Published in Pulp Literature, Summer 2024)
- "What's in a Name?" (Published in Lightspeed Magazine, August 2024)

=== Crime novels (as by Matt Hughes) ===
- Paroxysm (2013)
- One More Kill (2018)

==== Sid Rafferty ====
- Downshift (1997)
- Old Growth (2013)

==== Crime short fiction ====
- "Fishface and the Leg" (First published in Western Producer Magazine (1983); reprinted in Storyteller (1998) and Pulp Literature, January 2017)
- "Something to Sell" (First published in Alfred Hitchcock's Mystery Magazine, July 1998)
- "Number Crunch" (First published in Blue Murder Magazine, 1999)
- "One More Kill" (First published in Blue Murder Magazine, 1999; reprinted in Storyteller (2001), Alibis 9 (2004), Son and Foe (2006), Arthur Ellis Award for Best Crime Short Story winner, 1999)
- "Stepping Stones" (First published in Blue Murder Magazine, 2000)
- "Wipe Out" (First published in Blue Murder Magazine, 2000; reprinted in Iced: The New Noir Anthology of Cold, Hard Fiction (2001))
- "Mean Mr. Mustard" (First published in Storyteller, Winter 2003)
- "Muscle" (First published in Alfred Hitchcock's Mystery Magazine, September 2004)

=== Tie-in fiction (as by Hugh Matthews) ===
- Wolverine: Lifeblood (2007, reprinted in the Weapon X omnibus, 2020)
- Pathfinder Tales Web Fiction: "Krunzle the Quick" (2012)
- Pathfinder Tales: Song of the Serpent (2012)

=== Nonfiction (Ghostwritten) ===
- Breaking Trail: The Memoirs of Senator Leonard Marchand (2000)
- What's All This Got To Do With The Price of 2x4s? (2006)
