= Advanced d20 Magic =

Role-playing game sourcebook

Cover art by Niko Geyer

Advanced d20 Magic is a sourcebook published by Guardians of Order in 2006 that contains variant rules for the third edition of the fantasy role-playing game Dungeons & Dragons.

== Description ==
Spellcasters in Dungeons & Dragons and other d20 System role-playing games use a "fire & forget" system of magic first described in the Dying Earth stories and novels of sf author Jack Vance. In the Vancian system, the spellcaster must memorize a spell to use it. Once the spell has been cast, it fades from the spellcaster's memory, forcing the spellcaster to rememorize the spell.

Advanced d20 Magic uses a variant system of spellcasting for D&D and other d20 role-playing games. The variant system, called "Dynamic Spellcasting", allows spellcasters to cast any spell they know as often as they wish as a standard action without any special ingredients or other actions. However, spellcasting can drain a spellcaster's physical resources to the point of unconsciousness.

== Publication history ==
Guardians of Order, producers of the Big Eyes Small Mouth (BESM) role-playing game based on Japanese manga, also created a d20 role-playing game based on Slayers (2003), a Japanese novel series written by Hajime Kanzaka and illustrated by Rui Araizumi. Rather than the Vancian "fire & forget" system of spellcasting used in other d20 role-playing games, this system used a variant called "Dynamic Spellcasting".

In 2006, Guardians re-published Slayer's "Dynamic Magic" system as a variant for D&D and other d20 game systems in Advanced d20 Magic, a 144-page softcover book designed by David Lyons and Michelle Lyons, with interior art by Kythera, Anne Rouvin, and Melissa Uran, with cover art by Niko Geyer.

== Recognition ==
A copy of Advanced d20 Magic is held in the Judith Merril Collection of Science Fiction, Speculation & Fantasy (Toronto Public Library).
