= Songs of the Dying Earth =

2009 collection of fiction and essays edited by George R. R. Martin and Gardner Dozois

- First edition cover
- Editors: George R. R. Martin; Gardner Dozois
- Author: Various
- Language: English
- Series: Dying Earth tribute
- Genre: Science fiction/Fantasy
- Published: July 31, 2009
- Publisher: Subterranean Press
- Publication place: United States
- Media type: Print (Hardcover)
- Pages: 600
- ISBN: 1-59606-213-4

Songs of the Dying Earth: Stories in Honor of Jack Vance is a collection of short fiction and shorter essays composed in appreciation of the science fiction and fantasy author Jack Vance, especially his Dying Earth series. Edited by George R. R. Martin and Gardner Dozois, it was published in 2009 by Subterranean Press.

Twenty-two authors contributed short fiction and an Afterword, about thirty pages on average. Fifteen of the stories are novelettes (7500 to 17,500 words), six are shorter, and The Guiding Nose of Ulfänt Banderōz by Dan Simmons is a novella highlighted on the cover of the second U.S. edition.

As of May 2012 there have been British (Harper) and American (Tor) hardcover and trade paperback editions, an American audio edition, and two numbers of an Italian-language serialization.

== Contents ==
Each of the stories by 22 different authors is followed by that author's Afterword.

- "Thank you, Mr. Vance" by Dean R. Koontz
- "Preface" by Jack Vance

Stories, each with the author's Afterword

- "The True Vintage of Erzuine Thale" by Robert Silverberg
- "Grolion of Almery" by Matthew Hughes
- "The Copsy Door" by Terry Dowling
- "Caulk the Witch-chaser" by Liz Williams
- "Inescapable" by Mike Resnick
- "Abrizonde" by Walter Jon Williams
- "The Traditions of Karzh" by Paula Volsky
- "The Final Quest of the Wizard Sarnod" by Jeff VanderMeer
- "The Green Bird" by Kage Baker †
- "The Last Golden Thread" by Phyllis Eisenstein
- "An Incident in Uskvosk" by Elizabeth Moon
- "Sylgarmo's Proclamation" by Lucius Shepard †
- "The Lamentably Comical Tragedy (or The Laughingly Tragic Comedy) of Lixal Laqavee" by Tad Williams
- "Guyal the Curator" by John C. Wright
- "The Good Magician" by Glen Cook
- "The Return of the Fire Witch" by Elizabeth Hand
- "The Collegeum of Mauge" by Byron Tetrick
- "Evillo the Uncunning" by Tanith Lee
- "The Guiding Nose of Ulfänt Banderōz" by Dan Simmons
- "Frogskin Cap" by Howard Waldrop
- "A Night at the Tarn House" by George R. R. Martin
- "An Invocation of Incuriosity" by Neil Gaiman

† One story without supporting material is available online from Tor Books, the publisher of later U.S. editions: Baker, "The Green Bird".

† One story with supporting material is available online from Subterranean Press, the first publisher: Shepard, "Sylgarmo's Proclamation".

A longer version of VanderMeer's story was published as a chapbook in 500 signed and numbered copies, The Three Quests of the Wizard Sarnod (WSFA Press, 2010). The occasion was Ann and Jeff VanderMeer's appearance at 2010 Capclave as featured guests.
