= Chris Humphreys =

British–Canadian actor, playwright and novelist

- Born: Toronto, Ontario, Canada
- Other name: C.C. Humphreys
- Occupations: Author, actor, playwright, teacher
- Years active: 1978–present
- Children: 1
- Awards: Crime Writers of Canada Award for Best Novel for Plague (2015)
- Website: authorchrishumphreys.com

Chris Humphreys is a British–Canadian actor, playwright and novelist.

== Life ==
Humphreys was born in Toronto, Ontario. His father, Peter Humphreys, was an actor, writer and Battle of Britain fighter pilot. His mother, Ingegerd Holter, was a spy for the Norwegian resistance movement. He is also the grandson of actor Cecil Humphreys. He was raised in Los Angeles, California, until the age of seven and then grew up in the United Kingdom.

Humphreys currently lives on Salt Spring Island, British Columbia.

== Career ==
For screen acting he is best known for roles in The Bill, where he played PC Richard Turnham from 1989 to 1990, in AD Anno Domini as Caleb Wilson the gladiator, and leading roles in Zorro, Coronation Street, Hawkeye, Highlander: The Series, Goodnight Sweetheart, Wycliffe, Silent Witness, Scandal, The Core, The Adventures of Shirley Holmes.

Humphreys has recorded audio commentaries for several of his The Bill episodes, including "Traffic" (alongside writer Christopher Russell and co-star Andrew Mackintosh) and "Citadel" (alongside writer J. C. Wilsher). Humphreys also participated with eight of his co-stars for a three-part Zoom reunion for The Bill Podcast Patreon channel.

His leading stage roles have included Lord Mountbatten in the West End musical Always, Hamlet in Hamlet, Oberon in A Midsummer Night's Dream, and Jack Absolute in The Rivals (the main character for his Jack Absolute series of novels being based on the latter). He has also played Halvard Solness in Henrik Ibsen's The Master Builder, Tom in David Hare's Skylight, and Krapp in Samuel Beckett's Krapp's Last Tape.

As C.C. Humphreys, he has written several novels of historical fiction, including the award-winning Plague and the international bestseller Vlad The Last Confession. His books have been translated in several languages.

He writes fantasy novels as Chris Humphreys, including Smoke In The Glass published by Victor Gollancz and The Hunt of the Unicorn, first book in the The Tapestry Trilogy.

His plays have been produced in the UK and Canada, including Shakespeare’s Rebel at Vancouver's Bard on the Beach festival in 2015.

== Bibliography ==
=== Jack Absolute series ===
1. Jack Absolute. Orion Books, 2003.
2. The Blooding of Jack Absolute. Orion Books, 2006.
3. Absolute Honour. Orion Books, 2006.

=== The French Executioner series ===
1. The French Executioner. Orion Books, 2002.
2. Blood Ties. Orion Books, 2003.

=== The Runestone Saga ===
1. The Fetch. Random House Children's Books, 2006.
2. Vendetta. Random House Children's Books, 2007.
3. Possession. Random House Children's Books, 2008.

=== Other novels ===
1. Vlad: The Last Confession. Orion Books, 2009.
2. A Place Called Armageddon. Orion Books, 2011.
3. The Hunt of the Unicorn. Knopf Books for Young Readers, 2011.
4. Shakespeare's Rebel. Orion Books, 2014.
5. Plague: Century/Doubleday/Two Hats, 2014.
6. Fire: Century/Doubleday/Two Hats, 2016.
7. Chasing the Wind: Doubleday/Two Hats, 2018.

=== Short stories ===
1. "Where the Angels Wait". Pulp Literature, Issue 1, 2014.
2. "The Ankle Bracelet". Pulp Literature, Issue 14, 2017.
