= Flashing Swords! 4: Barbarians and Black Magicians =

1977 anthology edited by Lin Carter

Flashing Swords! #4: Barbarians and Black Magicians
- First edition
- Editor: Lin Carter
- Cover artist: Gary Viskupic
- Language: English
- Series: Flashing Swords!
- Genre: Fantasy
- Publisher: Nelson Doubleday
- Publication date: 1977
- Publication place: United States
- Media type: Print (Hardcover)
- Preceded by: Flashing Swords! #3: Warriors and Wizards
- Followed by: Flashing Swords! #5: Demons and Daggers

Flashing Swords! #4: Barbarians and Black Magicians is an anthology of fantasy stories, edited by Lin Carter. It was first published in hardcover by Nelson Doubleday in May 1977 as a selection in its Science Fiction Book Club, and in paperback by Dell Books in November 1977.

== Summary ==
The book collects five heroic fantasy novelettes by members of the Swordsmen and Sorcerers' Guild of America (SAGA), an informal literary group of fantasy authors active from the 1960s to the 1980s, of which Carter was also a member and guiding force, together with a general introduction and introductions to the individual stories by the editor.

All the novelettes were also published as portions of larger works by their respective authors, sometimes in revised form. Vance's "The Bagful of Dreams" became part of his Dying Earth novel Cugel's Saga (1983), while Anderson's "The Tupilak" was incorporated into his novel The Merman's Children (1979). Jakes's "Storm in a Bottle" was included in his Brak the Barbarian collection The Fortunes of Brak (1980). Kurtz's "Swords Against the Marluk" eventually became the basis of part of her Deryni novel The King's Deryni (2014). Moorcock's "The Lands Beyond the World" had already appeared as a section of his Elric novel The Sailor on the Seas of Fate (1976), though its appearance in this anthology did mark its first American publication.

== Contents ==
- "Introduction: Of Warriors and Wizards" by Lin Carter
- "The Bagful of Dreams" (Dying Earth) by Jack Vance
- "The Tupilak" by Poul Anderson
- "Storm in a Bottle" (Brak the Barbarian) by John Jakes
- "Swords Against the Marluk" (Deryni) by Katherine Kurtz
- "The Lands Beyond the World" (Elric of Melniboné) by Michael Moorcock

== Reception ==
The anthology was reviewed by Carter himself in The Year's Best Fantasy Stories: 4, 1978, and Helmut W. Pesch in Magira no. 33, 1980.
