= The Eyes of the Overworld =

1966 novel by Jack Vance

- Front cover of first edition
- Author: Jack Vance
- Cover artist: Jack Gaughan
- Language: English
- Series: Dying Earth
- Genre: Fantasy, Dying Earth subgenre
- Publisher: Ace Books
- Publication date: 1966
- Publication place: United States
- Media type: Print (paperback)
- Pages: 189 (first edition)
- OCLC: 429122
- Preceded by: The Dying Earth
- Followed by: Cugel's Saga

The Eyes of the Overworld is a picaresque fantasy fix-up novel by American writer Jack Vance, published by Ace in 1966, the second book in the Dying Earth series that Vance inaugurated in 1950. Retitled Cugel the Clever in its Vance Integral Edition (2005), the story takes place in Vance's Dying Earth setting, where the Sun is dying and magic and technology coexist. It features the self-proclaimed Cugel the Clever in linked episodic stories. Cugel is an anti-hero character; while he is typically a crafty scoundrel who seeks to turn a profit from a situation, he retains some good values at times. In the novel, Cugel is caught stealing from a wizard, who forces Cugel to travel to a faraway realm to find a rare magical jewel.

The components of the fix-up were five short works published in The Magazine of Fantasy & Science Fiction from December 1965 to July 1966, and one original to the book.

The 1934 film The Spectacle Maker, based on the 1913 Frank Harris story "The Magic Glasses", also features magic spectacles which show the wearer beautiful illusions instead of reality, as the eponymous "Eyes of the Overworld" do.

== Plot summary ==
Cugel is easily persuaded by the merchant Fianosther to attempt the burglary of the manse of Iucounu the Laughing Magician, which is filled with precious magical items. Caught by Iucounu's trap, Cugel agrees that in exchange for his freedom he will undertake the recovery of a small hemisphere of violet glass, a magic "Eye of the Overworld", to match one already in the wizard's possession. A small sentient alien entity of barbs and hooks, named Firx, is attached to Cugel's liver to encourage his "unremitting loyalty, zeal and singleness of purpose". Firx's only form of communication with its host is to cause pain to his liver if Firx senses that Cugel is lapsing in his mission and his return home. Iucounu then uses a spell to transport Cugel via flying demon to the isolated Land of Cutz, which is very far away.

There, Cugel finds two villages, one occupied by wearers of the magic violet lenses, the other by peasants who work on behalf of the lens-wearers in hopes of being promoted to their ranks. The lenses cause their wearers to see, not their squalid surroundings, but the Overworld, a vastly superior version of reality where a hut is a palace, gruel is a magnificent feast, and peasant women are princesses — "seeing the world through rose-colored glasses" on a grand scale.

The people are not willing to just give Cugel an Eye, but insist that he be on a many-years-long waiting list for one. Cugel gains an Eye by trickery, and makes a perilous escape from Cutz. He then undertakes an arduous trek back to Iucounu, cursing the magician the entire way; this forms the principal part of the book.

Cugel voyages across mountains, wastelands, and water, encountering unusual characters with curious beliefs and customs. He faces many challenges, including bandits, ghosts, and ghoulish creatures. Using a Machiavellian mindset, he survives by tricking or betraying the people he encounters. He joins a religious cult and tricks them into crossing a vast desert, which leads to many of his comrades dying. Cugel also falls victim to the trickery of others, such as when he is fooled into being locked in a watchtower in a lakeside town or when he is lured into imprisonment in a cave by the devious Rat People. Finally, he gets a spell that magically returns him home.

After many pitfalls, setbacks, and harrowing escapes, including a voyage back in time a million years, ending in the eviction of Firx from his system, and a grateful wizard speeding him by a spell back home, Cugel returns to Iucounu's manse, where he finds the wizard's volition has been captured by a twin to Firx. Cugel manages to extirpate the alien, subdue the magician, and enjoy the easy life in the manse, until he tries to banish Iucounu and Fianosther (who himself has come to pilfer from Cugel) with the same spell that the magician had used on him. But Cugel's tongue slips in his hubristic attempt to utter the incantation, and the flying demon seizes him instead, delivering him to the same isolated spot as before.

Author Michael Shea wrote an authorized sequel, A Quest for Simbilis (DAW Books, NY, 1974). Vance's own Cugel sequel was published as Cugel's Saga in 1983.

== Cugel's character ==
Cugel is a classic Vance anti-hero; though he fancies himself an aesthete and a superior being to those around him, in his actions he is a liar, a cheat, an inveterate thief, a charlatan, selfish, greedy, vicious, and so on. However, Cugel has always lived a life of poverty and often needed these attributes for survival. With less obloquy, Vance describes him as "a man of many capabilities, with a disposition at once flexible and pertinacious. He was long of leg, deft of hand, light of finger, soft of tongue ... His darting eye, long inquisitive nose and droll mouth gave his somewhat lean and bony face an expression of vivacity, candor, and affability. He had known many vicissitudes, gaining therefrom a suppleness, a fine discretion, a mastery of both bravado and stealth."

Cugel often finds himself in a situation of revenge, and tries to take advantage of those who used him, complaining when they trick him, curse him as he harms them, or expose his wiles. But almost always Cugel comes out on top, leaving a blazing trail of destruction and chaos behind him. He can be said to simultaneously have both the best and worst luck in all the Dying Earth.

Cugel fancies himself a seducer of women, but his charms are apparent mainly to himself, and to certain types of women that wish to use him. His record is not good: he trades one, having lost her the rulership of a city (after she had manipulated him), to bandits in exchange for safe passage; another he must leave to drown, in the face of the monster "Magnatz", and does nothing to avert the destruction of her village (after she had broken a promise of everlasting love engagement); he causes the village of a third to be abandoned in dread (after she lies to the local thug religious zealots to get them to use force upon him).

It must be said that he treats men scarcely better. For example, he bribes a priest, with all of his very valuable magical items, into tricking fifty pilgrims into a futile pilgrimage, to guard his crossing of a perilous desert – only fifteen survive. On the other hand, Cugel displays a genuine regard for the most selfless of the pilgrims, showing a trait of "do unto others..." which is essentially the basis of the book.

== Fix-up ==
The components of the fix-up were five novelettes published in The Magazine of Fantasy & Science Fiction between December 1965 and July 1966 and one, the second in sequence, published directly as part of the novel The Eyes of the Overworld in 1966 without any prior magazine appearance. "Cil", the second chapter, was later published as a stand-alone novelette in 1969 in the collection Eight Fantasms and Magics. The Eyes of the Overworld has seven chapters because the last in sequence of the separately published novelettes, "The Manse of Iucounu", has two sections, which become two separate chapters in the book.

1. "The Overworld", F&SF December 1965
2. "Cil", The Eyes of the Overworld, Ace, 1966
3. "The Mountains of Magnatz", F&SF February 1966
4. "The Sorcerer Pharesm", F&SF April 1966
5. "The Pilgrims", F&SF June 1966
6. "The Cave in the Forest" — originally the first part of "The Manse of Iucounu"
7. "The Manse of Iucounu", F&SF July 1966

In The Eyes of the Overworld, the episode involving the Busiacos narrated at the beginning of chapter 3, "The Mountains of Magnatz", differs substantially from the novelette published in the February 1966 issue of The Magazine of Fantasy and Science Fiction. In the magazine serialisation of the novel, at the end of "The Overworld" the character Derwe Coreme rides off in her walking-boat never to be heard of again, and at the beginning of "The Mountains of Magnatz" Cugel finds himself alone in the northern wasteland. Cugel pays the Busiacos a jewelled button to ferry him across a river that he could just as easily have waded through and then proceeds south, refusing to believe he has been duped even when he sees a nearby bridge. In the novel the episode is longer and more elaborate, and reveals Cugel to be not only gullible, but also capable of thoroughly despicable actions: after the events described in the interpolated chapter 2, "Cil", Cugel awakes in the northern wasteland with Derwe Coreme, whom he sells into slavery to the Busiacos in exchange for their redundantly guiding him across a stretch of forest measuring a hundred paces.

== Translations ==
A Dutch translation, Ogen van de Overwereld, was published by Meulenhoff in 1974. The French translation, Cugel l'Astucieux, published by J'ai Lu, was first published in 1976, with further editions in 1984 and 2000. The German translation, Das Auge der Überwelt, was published in 1976 by Pabel Moewig Verlag, as no. 277 in its Terra Science Fiction series. The Spanish translation, Los ojos del sobremundo, was published in 1986 by Ultramar Editores in the collection Grandes Éxitos de Bolsillo. The Italian translation, Cugel l'astuto, appeared in an omnibus version together with La terra morente (The Dying Earth) in 1994, published by Editrice Nord. The book was also translated to Russian (Глаза чужого мира).

== See also ==
- The Futurological Congress

== Sources ==
- Underwood, Tim; Chuck Miller (1980). Jack Vance. New York: Taplinger Publishing Company. p. 228. ISBN 0-8008-4295-2.
