= Dying Earth =

Series of fantasy novels by Jack Vance

- Dust jacket of the 1999 omnibus edition
- The Dying Earth (1950); The Eyes of the Overworld (1966); Cugel's Saga (1983); Rhialto the Marvellous (1984)
- Author: Jack Vance
- Cover artist: various Gerald Brom, depicted
- Country: United States
- Language: English
- Genre: Speculative fiction, Dying Earth subgenre
- Published: 1950–1984
- Media type: Print
- No. of books: 4 by Vance (see sequels)

Dying Earth is a speculative fiction series by the American author Jack Vance, comprising four books originally published from 1950 to 1984. Some have been called picaresque. The series includes short story collections, fix-ups, and novels.

The first book in the series, The Dying Earth, was ranked number 16 of 33 "All Time Best Fantasy Novels" by Locus in 1987, based on a poll of subscribers, although it was marketed as a collection and the Internet Speculative Fiction Database (ISFDB) calls it a "slightly connected series of stories".

The Dying Earth series has been described as a "sword and sorcery" series, as the plots of the various stories often revolve around picaresque exploits, swordplay, and magic.

== Setting ==
The stories of the Dying Earth series are set in the distant future, at a point when the sun is almost exhausted and magic has reasserted itself as a dominant force. The Moon has disappeared and the Sun is in danger of burning out at any time, often flickering as if about to go out, before shining again. The various civilizations of Earth have collapsed for the most part into decadence or religious fanaticism and its inhabitants overcome with a fatalistic outlook. The Earth is mostly barren and cold, and has become infested with various predatory monsters (possibly created by a magician in a former age).

Magic in the Dying Earth is performed by memorizing syllables, and the human brain can only accommodate a certain number at once. When a spell is used, the syllables vanish from the caster's mind. Creatures called sandestins can be summoned and used to perform more complex actions, but are considered dangerous to rely upon. Magic has loose links to the science of old, and advanced mathematics is treated like arcane lore.

The Dying Earth exists alongside several Overworlds and Underworlds. These help add a sense of profound longing and entrapment to the series. While humans can, with relative ease, physically travel to the horrific Underworlds (as Cugel does on several occasions, to his dismay) the vast majority of the population are only capable of mentally visiting the wondrous Overworlds through rare artifacts (e.g. through the "Eyes of the Overworld") or dangerous magic phenomena (such as the ship Cugel encounters in the deserts). Though they can look at the wonders and pretend they are really there, humans can never truly inhabit or escape to these utopias as their physical bodies remain stuck on the Dying Earth and will die with the sun regardless. These siren-like visions of paradise lead to the deaths, insanity, and suffering of many, especially during Cugel's journeys.

While most remaining civilizations on the Dying Earth are utterly unique in their customs and cultures, there are some common threads. Because the moon is gone and wind is often weak (the sun no longer heats the earth as much) the oceans are largely placid bodies of water with no tide and tiny waves. To cross them, boats are propelled by giant sea-worms. These worms are cared for and controlled by "Wormingers". In addition, the manses of magicians, protected by walls and spells and monsters, are relatively common sights in inhabited lands.

== Origins ==
Vance wrote the stories of the first book while he served in the United States Merchant Marine during World War II. In the late 1940s several of his other stories were published in magazines.

Science fiction historian Brian Stableford noted the influence of Clark Ashton Smith and his "Zothique" stories on the "Dying Earth" series.

According to pulp editor Sam Merwin, Vance's earliest magazine submissions in the 1940s were heavily influenced by the style of James Branch Cabell. Fantasy historian Lin Carter has noted several probable lasting influences of Cabell on Vance's work, and suggests that the early "pseudo-Cabell" experiments bore fruit in The Dying Earth (1950).

== Series ==
The series comprises four books by Vance and some sequels by other authors that may be or may not have been canonical.

- The Dying Earth — 1950 collection of original, related stories
- The Eyes of the Overworld — 1966 fix-up
- Cugel's Saga — 1983 novel
- Rhialto the Marvellous — 1984 collection of related stories and one canonical essay

One 741-page omnibus edition has been issued as The Compleat Dying Earth (SF Book Club, 1999) and in both the US and UK as Tales of the Dying Earth (2000).

=== Stories by Vance ===
All four books were published with Tables of Contents, the first and fourth as collections. The second and third contained mostly material previously published in short story form but were marketed as novels, the second as a fix-up and the third without acknowledging any previous publication.

1. The Dying Earth (the author's preferred title is Mazirian the Magician) was openly a collection of six stories, all original, although written during Vance's war service. ISFDB calls them "slightly connected" and catalogs the last as a novella (17,500 to 40,000 word count).
  1. "Turjan of Miir"
  2. "Mazirian the Magician"
  3. "T'sais"
  4. "Liane the Wayfarer" (also known as "The Loom of Darkness")
  5. "Ulan Dhor Ends a Dream" (also known as "Ulan Dhor")
  6. "Guyal of Sfere" (it mentions a "Lost Book of Kells", but a later publishing changed the name as there is a Book of Kells)
2. The Eyes of the Overworld (the author's preferred title is Cugel the Clever) was a fix-up of six stories, presented as seven. All were novelettes by word count (7500 to 17,500). Five were previously published as noted here.
  1. "The Overworld", from F&SF December 1965
  2. "Cil" (1966), the original component
  3. "The Mountains of Magnatz", from F&SF February 1966
  4. "The Sorcerer Pharesm", from F&SF April 1966
  5. "The Pilgrims", from F&SF June 1966
  6. "The Cave in the Forest", originally the first part of "The Manse of Iucounu"
  7. "The Manse of Iucounu", from F&SF July 1966
3. Cugel's Saga (the author's preferred title is Cugel: The Skybreak Spatterlight) was marketed as a novel. ISFDB calls it "[t]wice as large and less episodic than The Eyes of the Overworld" but qualifies that label. "This is marketed as a novel, but there is a table of contents, and some of the parts were previously published (although none are acknowledged thus)." It catalogs previous publication of three chapters without remark on the degree of revision.
  1. "Flutic", the first part of the first chapter, published separately in the Italian anthology Fantasy (November 1996) and rereleased in English in Coup de Grace and Other Stories, a sampler of the Vance Integral Edition
  2. "The Inn of Blue Lamps"
  3. "Aboard the Galante"
  4. "Lausicaa"
  5. "The Ocean of Sighs"
  6. "The Columns"
  7. "Faucelme"
  8. "On the Docks"
  9. "The Caravan"
  10. "The Seventeen Virgins", from F&SF October 1974
  11. "The Bagful of Dreams", from Flashing Swords #4, ed. Lin Carter, May 1977
  12. "The Four Wizards"
  13. "Spatterlight"
4. Rhialto the Marvellous was marketed as a collection, a Foreword and three stories, one previously published. The Foreword is non-narrative canonical fiction presenting the general state of the world in the 21st Aeon (a "short story" loosely).
  1. "Foreword", with list of players
  2. "The Murthe"
  3. "Fader's Waft"
  4. "Morreion", from Flashing Swords! #1, ed. Lin Carter, April 1973

=== Sequels ===
Some sequels have been written by other authors, either with Vance's authorization or as tributes to his work.

Michael Shea's first publication, the novel A Quest for Simbilis (DAW Books, 1974, OCLC 2128177), was an authorized sequel to Eyes. However, "When Vance returned to the milieu, his Cugel's Saga continued the events of The Eyes of the Overworld in a different direction."

The tribute anthology Songs of the Dying Earth (2009) contains short fiction set in the world of the Dying Earth by numerous writers alongside tributes to Vance's work and influence.

In 2010 Shea wrote another authorized story belonging to the Dying Earth series and featuring Cugel as one of characters: "Hew the Tintmaster", published in the anthology Swords & Dark Magic: The New Sword and Sorcery, ed. Jonathan Strahan and Lou Anders (Eos, 2010, pp. 323–362).

=== Translations ===
WorldCat contributing libraries report holding all four books in French, Spanish, and (in omnibus edition) Hebrew translations; and report holding The Dying Earth in five other languages: Finnish, German, Japanese, Polish, and Russian. (Note: The German national library (DNB) catalog lists German-language translations of all four Dying Earth books, which establishes some under-reporting by WorldCat. Beside non-participation, there may be some confusion regarding "(the) dying earth" as the first of four book and as the entire series.)

The whole first volume (of six stories) has been translated also into Esperanto together with two Cugel stories and made available on-line as e-books by a long-time fan and Vance Integral Edition co-worker. Permission to translate and distribute (only into Esperanto) was obtained informally direct from the author and, since his death in 2013, continues with ongoing permission from the author's estate. To date these are three: Mazirien la Magiisto, Kugel la Ruza, and Kugel la Ĉielorompa Ŝpruĉlumo available for free download as EPub, Mobi and PDF.

The entire series has seen several Italian translations, and in Italy Vance remains one of the US scifi authors most often translated and published

== Legacy ==
The Dying Earth subgenre of science fiction is named in recognition of Vance's role in standardizing a setting, the entropically dying earth and sun. Its importance was recognized with the publication of Songs of the Dying Earth, a tribute anthology edited by George R. R. Martin and Gardner Dozois (Subterranean, 2009). Each short story in the anthology is set on the Dying Earth, and concludes with a short acknowledgement by the author of Vance's influence on them.

=== Print ===
Gene Wolfe's The Book of the New Sun (1980–83) is set in a slightly similar world, and was written under Vance's influence. Wolfe suggested in The Castle of the Otter, a collection of essays, that he inserted the book The Dying Earth into his fictional world under the title The Book of Gold (specifically, Wolfe wrote that the "Book of Gold" mentioned in The Book of the New Sun is different for each reader, but for him it was "The Dying Earth"). Wolfe has extended the series.

Michael Shea's novel Nifft the Lean (1982), his second book eight years after A Quest for Simbilis, also owes much debt to Vance's creation, since the protagonist of the story is a petty thief (not unlike Cugel the Clever), who travels and struggles in an exotic world. Shea returned to Nifft with 1997 and 2000 sequels.

The Archonate stories by Matthew Hughes — the 1994 novel Fools Errant and numerous works in this millennium — take place in "the penultimate age of Old Earth," a period of science and technology that is on the verge of transforming into the magical era of the time of the Dying Earth. Booklist has called him Vance's "heir apparent." (Review by Carl Hays of The Gist Hunter and Other Stories, Booklist, August 2005)

=== Role-playing ===
The original creators of the Dungeons & Dragons games were fans of Jack Vance and incorporated many aspects of the Dying Earth series into the game. The magic system, in which a wizard is limited in the number of spells that can be simultaneously remembered and forgets them once they are cast, was based on the magic of Dying Earth. In role-playing game circles, this sort of magic system is called "Vancian" or "Vancean". Some of the spells from Dungeons & Dragons are based on spells mentioned in the Dying Earth series, such as the prismatic spray. Magic items from the Dying Earth stories such as ioun stones also made their way into Dungeons & Dragons. One of the deities of magic in Dungeons & Dragons is named Vecna, an anagram of "Vance".

The Talislanta role-playing game designed by Stephan Michael Sechi and originally published in 1987 by Bard Games was inspired by the works of Jack Vance so much so that the first release, The Chronicles of Talislanta, is dedicated to the author.

There is an official Dying Earth role-playing game published by Pelgrane Press with an occasional magazine The Excellent Prismatic Spray (named after a magic spell). The game situates players in Vance's world populated by desperately extravagant people. Many other role-playing settings pay homage to the series by including fantasy elements he invented such as the darkness-dwelling Grues.

Monte Cook identifies The Dying Earth as an inspiration for his game Numenera.

Goodman Games have announced the publication of the setting using their Dungeon Crawl Classics roleplaying game system, running a successful Kickstarter campaign for it. The game was released in 2023.
