= Telek (novella) =

- Short story by Jack Vance
- Genre: Science fiction

Publication
- Published in: Astounding Science Fiction
- Publication date: January 1952

Telek is a science fiction novella about telekinesis by American author Jack Vance. It was first published in the January 1952 issue of Astounding Science Fiction.

== Plot summary ==
In the near future, humanity is divided into two groups: normal humans and Teleks. Teleks have the ability to move objects using only the power of their minds. The telekinetic ability is said to be partly hereditary and partly learned. The story takes place sixty years after the Teleks first appeared; most of the four thousand Teleks are second-generation, having acquired the ability shortly after birth. The Teleks live apart from normal humans in Glarietta Pavilion, a floating city. They collect precious metals from the moon and other planets which they use to purchase menial labor and other services from ordinary human beings.

The story opens with an attack on a Telek by an enraged worker, followed by the murder of the Telek. A witness, named Shorn, who is a member of a subversive society, arranges for the body to be disposed of. The murderer is caught and killed, presumably by the Teleks. The remainder of the story follows Shorn as he infiltrates Telek society and persuades a Telek to give him telekinetic powers. In the final scene, Shorn brings 265 normal humans disguised as Teleks to the first annual Telek convention, where he tricks the assembled Teleks into giving the humans telekinetic powers.

== Publication history ==
Since its first publication in the January 1952 issue of Astounding, Telek has been reprinted a number of times, in Eight Fantasms and Magics (1969), Great Short Novels of Science Fiction (1970), When The Five Moons Rise (1992), and The World-Thinker and Other Stories (2005).
