= The Miracle Workers (Vance story) =

1958 science-fiction novella by Jack Vance

The Miracle-Workers is a science fiction novella by Jack Vance published in 1958. It was first published in Astounding Science Fiction in the July 1958 edition. It is about humans on an Earth-like planet which was colonized by space travellers many centuries ago. In the intervening years, the inhabitants have lost their understanding of science and have regressed to a medieval state of technology, aided by their use of voodoo, telepathy, and magic. Change is set in motion when a maverick apprentice Jinxman starts to rediscover the scientific method and learn about science.

The story was nominated for 'Best Novelette' at the 1959 Hugo Awards.

== Setting and background ==
The story is about a colony of human space voyagers founded when they took refuge on the Earth-like planet of Pangborn 1,600 years ago during a space war. The first colonists were still worried about the risk of attack, so they built huge fortresses and mounted heavy weapons from the spaceships on the ramparts. At the time of the story, the society has lost all of their knowledge of modern science, except for a small number of still-functioning air-cars.

They use a medieval level of technology, such as horse-drawn carriages and simple tools. The planet is divided into feudal territories that are defended by mounted knights and foot soldiers carrying crossbows, swords and spears. To supplement these weapons, they have developed a type of telepathy which is used as a battle weapon. The telepathy is done by skilled “Jinxmen”, who cast spells and manipulate enemy troops using wooden cabinets filled with small voodoo dolls representing their opponents.

The "First Folk" (also called "autochthon") are indigenous hominids who live in the forested areas. They were brutally hunted down by the initial human colonists. While the human colonists gradually lost their scientific knowledge, the First Folk took up the scientific method that the first colonists showed them and continued to develop it over the centuries.

== Plot ==
In the story, much of the planet is ruled by Lord Faide. He is close to conquering the final feudal lord who opposes him, Lord Ballant, and is on the march to attack Lord Ballant's fortress with an army of knights, foot soldiers, and telepathic “Jinxmen”-sorcerers. However, his army faces a second challenge: the First Folk are growing forests in the path of the army, which blocks their passage.

The First Folk are angry at the historic slaughter of their ancestors and about their planet being taken over by the colonists, so they defend the forest. They are adept at using traps such as deadfalls, so if the army has to go through the First Folk's new forests, they will be vulnerable to attack from the First Folk. Lord Faide's advisors suggest that he detour around the forests, but this will give Lord Ballant time to bring in reinforcements.

A young apprentice of Lord Faide's head Jinxman has been experimenting with scientific approaches to defeating the First Folk. The apprentice has been studying the ancient scientific texts from their space-faring ancestors. After Lorde Faide wins the battle against Lord Ballant, he is for a time the overlord of the planet. However, the peace does not last long, as the First Folk launch a guerrilla war against the colonists using the First Folk's scientifically-bred army of arthropod creatures, which they are producing as bioweapons on an industrial scale.

Lord Faide first tries to fight the First Folk and their arthropods with his army's crossbows and swords, but these are not effective. He next brings in his team of Jinxmen-sorcerers, but their effectiveness relies on a mixture of telepathically getting into the mind of a human enemy, and on manipulating and tricking them. Given that the enemy in the guerrilla war are First Folk hominids and arthropods, the Jinxmen's voodoo and tricks do not work. Lord Faide has to turn to the young apprentice's study of science.

== Reception ==
The story's exploration of imperialism and colonialism was noted, as was the examination of the Renaissance of the scientific method.

Phil Giunta states " is a brief but engaging exploration into imperialism and colonialism with an interesting twist."

It has been described as a "fun piece of short fiction that falls short of Vance’s two more well-known novellas for only a couple of reasons. The structure not as pure as The Dragon Masters and theme not as developed as The Last Castle, The Miracle Workers nevertheless displays all of the imagination and cleverness that are Vance’s trademarks".
