= Old Venus =

2015 anthology edited by George R. R. Martin and Gardner Dozois

- First edition cover
- Editors: George R. R. Martin; Gardner Dozois
- Author: Various
- Cover artist: Stephen Youll
- Language: English
- Genre: Science fiction
- Published: March 3, 2015
- Publisher: Bantam Books
- Publication place: United States
- Media type: Print (hardcover)
- Pages: 608
- ISBN: 978-0-345-53728-7
- Preceded by: Old Mars

Old Venus is a "retro Venus science fiction"-themed anthology edited by George R. R. Martin and Gardner Dozois, published on March 3, 2015. It's a follow-up to the anthology Old Mars (2013), both of them written in the planetary romance tradition. All of Old Venus stories are set on the planet Venus as styled in the pre-space probe pulp magazines of the 1930s through the 1950s, when the planet was presumed to have a high likelihood of being habitable.

== Contents ==
The anthology includes 17 stories:

- Introduction: Return to Venusport by Gardner Dozois
- "Frogheads" by Allen M. Steele
- "The Drowned Celestrial" by Lavie Tidhar
- "Planet of Fear" by Paul McAuley
- "Greeves and the Evening Star" by Matthew Hughes
- "A Planet Called Desire" by Gwyneth Jones
- "Living Hell" by Joe Haldeman
- "Bones of Air, Bones of Stone" by Stephen Leigh
- "Ruins" by Eleanor Arnason
- "The Tumbledowns of Cleopatra Abyss" by David Brin
- "By Frogsled and Lizardback to Outcast Venusian Lepers" by Garth Nix
- "The Sunset of Time" by Michael Cassutt
- "Pale Blue Memories" by Tobias S. Buckell
- "The Heart's Filthy Lesson" by Elizabeth Bear
- "The Wizard of the Trees" by Joe R. Lansdale
- "The Godstone of Venus" by Mike Resnick
- "Botanica Veneris: Thirteen Papercuts by Ida Countess Rathangan" by Ian McDonald

== See also ==
- Farewell, Fantastic Venus - a collection of freshly-obsolete habitable-Venus stories from 1968
- Venus in fiction
