= Old Mars =

2013 anthology edited by George R. R. Martin and Gardner Dozois

- First edition cover
- Editors: George R. R. Martin; Gardner Dozois
- Author: Various
- Language: English
- Genre: Science fiction
- Published: October 8, 2013
- Publisher: Bantam Books
- Publication place: United States
- Media type: Print (Hardcover)
- Pages: 512
- ISBN: 978-0-345-53727-0
- Followed by: Old Venus

Old Mars is a "retro Mars science fiction"-themed anthology edited by George R. R. Martin and Gardner Dozois, published on October 8, 2013. According to the publisher Tor Books, the collection celebrates the "Golden Age of Science Fiction", an era before advanced astronomy and space exploration told us what we currently know about the Solar System, when "of all the planets orbiting that G-class star we call the Sun, none was so steeped in an aura of romantic decadence, thrilling mystery, and gung-ho adventure as Mars." Old Mars won a 2014 Locus Award.

== Contents ==
The anthology includes 15 stories:

- "Red Planet Blues" (Introduction) by George R.R. Martin
- "Martian Blood" by Allen M. Steele; a doctor explores the Martian wilds in search of a blood sample from a native Martian.
- "The Ugly Duckling" by Matthew Hughes; an archaeologist explores "the ruins of the Martian past in a place from which few have returned." The story draws heavily from the setting of Ray Bradbury's The Martian Chronicles.
- "The Wreck of the Mars Adventure" by David D. Levine; in 1701, pirate William Kidd must journey to Mars to earn a pardon for his crimes. In 2016, Levine published a novel sequel, Arabella of Mars.
- "Swords of Zar-Tu-Kan" by S.M. Stirling; a "tale of kidnap and rescue." This story is a prequel to Stirling's 2008 novel In the Courts of the Crimson Kings.
- "Shoals" by Mary Rosenblum; disabled Maartin is one of the few people who can see the native inhabitants of Mars.
- "In the Tombs of the Martian Kings" by Mike Resnick; "an Indiana Jones-type story set on the ruins of Martian civilization."
- "Out of Scarlight" by Liz Williams; a story involving "a missing dancer, romance, and a sorcerer."
- "The Dead Sea-Bottom Scrolls" by Howard Waldrop; a tale "like a journalistic account from a man of science." Nominated for a 2014 Locus Award.
- "A Man Without Honor" by James S. A. Corey; a story with a premise reminiscent of Edgar Rice Burroughs' Mars.
- "Written In Dust" by Melinda Snodgrass; a story about a family and a strange Martian illness.
- "The Lost Canal" by Michael Moorcock; an adventure about a man in search of a bomb he needs to disarm.
- "The Sunstone" by Phyllis Eisenstein; "the analogue for White Man’s intrusion into North America, with added mysticism."
- "King of the Cheap Romance" by Joe R. Lansdale; a girl and her father try to bring the cure to Martian Fever back to their village.
- "Mariner" by Chris Roberson; a "swashbuckling tale" featuring Roberson's Jason Carmody.
- "The Queen of the Night’s Aria" by Ian McDonald; "a tale of people on the front lines of a Martian war."

== Reception ==
Robert H. Bedford wrote that "the majority of these stories were strong, fun and evocative," noting "only a few out of the dozen plus didn’t fully engage me." He called the works of Eisenstein, Corey, Roberson, Rosenblum and Steele "definite standouts."

Old Mars won a 2014 Locus Award, and Howard Waldrop's story "The Dead Sea-Bottom Scrolls" was also nominated.

== See also ==
- Mars in fiction
- Rainbow Mars, another short story collection homaging older fiction about Mars
