= Flashing Swords! 1 =

1973 anthology edited by Lin Carter

Flashing Swords! #1
- Cover art from the first edition.
- Editor: Lin Carter
- Cover artist: Frank Frazetta
- Language: English
- Series: Flashing Swords!
- Genre: Fantasy
- Publisher: Nelson Doubleday
- Publication date: 1973
- Publication place: United States
- Media type: Print (Hardcover)
- Pages: xiv, 175
- Followed by: Flashing Swords! #2

Flashing Swords! #1 is an anthology of fantasy stories, edited by the American writer Lin Carter. It was first published in hardcover by Nelson Doubleday in April 1973 as a selection in its Science Fiction Book Club, and in paperback by Dell Books in July the same year. The first British edition was issued by Mayflower in 1974.

== Summary ==
The book collects four heroic fantasy novelettes by members of the Swordsmen and Sorcerers' Guild of America (SAGA), an informal literary group of fantasy authors active from the 1960s to the 1980s, of which Carter was also a member and guiding force, together with a general introduction and introductions to the individual stories by the editor.

== Contents ==
- "Introduction: Of Swordsmen and Sorcerers" by Lin Carter
- "The Sadness of the Executioner" (Fafhrd and the Gray Mouser) by Fritz Leiber
- "Morreion" (Dying Earth) by Jack Vance
- "The Merman's Children" by Poul Anderson
- "The Higher Heresies of Oolimar" (Amalric the Mangod) by Lin Carter

== Awards ==
The book placed eleventh in the 1974 Locus Poll Award for Best Original Anthology.

== Reception ==
The anthology was reviewed by Bert Duch in Amra v. 2, no. 60, September 1973.
