= The Dying Earth =

1950 anthology by Jack Vance

- Front cover of the first edition
- Author: Jack Vance
- Cover artist: uncredited (first)
- Language: English
- Series: Dying Earth
- Genre: Fantasy, Dying Earth subgenre
- Publisher: Hillman Periodicals
- Publication date: 1950
- Publication place: United States
- Media type: Print (paperback)
- Pages: 175 or 176 (first)
- OCLC: 8479962
- Followed by: The Eyes of the Overworld

The Dying Earth is a collection of science fantasy/fantasy short fiction by American writer Jack Vance, published by Hillman in 1950. Vance returned to the setting in 1965 and thereafter, making it the first book in the Dying Earth series. It was retitled Mazirian the Magician in the Vance Integral Edition (2005), according to Vance's expressed preference.

The Internet Speculative Fiction Database calls it a "slightly connected series of stories", but it was ranked number 16 of 33 "All Time Best Fantasy Novels" by Locus in 1987, based on a poll of subscribers. Similarly, it was one of five finalists for the Best Novel "Retro Hugo" in 2001 when the World Science Fiction Society provided 50th anniversary recognition for a publication year without Hugo Awards.

== Synopsis ==
1. Turjan of Miir cannot reliably create humans in his vats. He seeks out Pandelume for answers. On his journey, he encounters a vengeful woman who tries to kill him. Pandelume reveals she is T'sais, and she hates all creation. He created her before he perfected his vat process.

Pandelume will share his expertise if Turjan obtains an amulet for him. The amulet is worn by Prince Kandive. Turjan duels with Kandive and obtains the amulet. He apprentices with Pandelume and learns the lore of "mathematics". Pandelume explains, "it elucidates every problem, each phase of existence, all the secrets of time and space. Your spells and runes are built upon its power and codified according to a great underlying mosaic of magic."

Turjan creates T'sain, a twin of T'sais. When she sees her twin, T'sais overcomes her initial urge to destroy the woman and vows to understand the beauty of Earth.

2. Mazirian the Magician is regularly visited by a mysterious woman whom he fails to entrap with all his magic. He has struggled to create humanity in his vats, and he imprisoned Turjan in order to find the secret.

He chases the woman one day. She is T'sain and has been visiting Mazirian to figure out how to free Turjan. When Mazirian is trapped in a forest, the woman doubles back and rescues Turjan.

3. T'sais travels to Earth to continue her education about beauty. She encounters many dangers and is given refuge by a hooded man named Etarr. He explains his face was turned hideous by the enchantress Javanne. T'sais falls in love with Etarr, and they track down Javanne to restore his face.

4. Liane the Wayfarer acquires an invisibility ring. He tries to rape a golden witch named Lith. She holds him at bay with enchanted weapons. Lith shows Liane a golden tapestry that depicts the Magic Valley of Ariventa. Half of it has been stolen by Chun the Unavoidable. Lith vows to sleep with Liane if he retrieves it.

Liane journeys to Chun's fortress. The approach is littered with eyeless corpses. When Liane finds the tapestry, Chun is hiding behind it. He wears a cloak made of eyeballs. Liane flees and uses his invisibility ring, but Chun is unavoidable. The story ends with Chun delivering two threads to Lith in exchange for Liane's eyeballs. She weaves them into her tapestry and dreams of returning to Ariventa.

- "Ulan Dhor"
- "Guyal of Sfere"

=== Notes ===
All stories are original to the collection.

The Vance Integral Edition puts "Mazirian" first in the volume. This makes sense as Vance wanted to title the collection after that story, but stops doing so when you keep in mind that Turjan meets T'sain and learns the appropriate lore in the story titled after him, which therefore must come before.

== Setting ==
During a far future time, the Sun nears the end of its life. The sky ranges from pink to deep blue, lit by a dim red Sun, and strange plants and animals exist. Much of the book is set within the forested country of Ascolais and in the ruined cities covering the landscape.

The setting is marked by the presence of ancient ruins and other fragments of decayed civilizations. The human population is shrinking. Most live in structures built long ago, in varying degrees of ruin, squalor, or luxury. Many also make use of magic (or in some cases, technology) which was created long ago but which they no longer understand. Characters often make carefree, nihilistic references to the unknown, but presumed short, time remaining before the Sun dies and the Earth dies with it.

Many of the important people in Ascolais are magicians. They use magic by memorizing lengthy formulas for spells and activating them by speaking the proper commands. Once cast, the spell formula is forgotten, requiring the wizard to reread and re-memorize them. Because even talented magicians can only memorize and must "load" a handful of spells, they also have to rely on relics and their other talents for protection. There are only one hundred spells which are still known to mankind, of thousands which were discovered over the course of history. Pandelume implies that "magic" has a scientific origin; many spells were invented through the use of mathematics. Regardless of this, it appears that purely supernatural powers exist as well.

== Characters ==
=== Title characters ===
- Guyal of Sfere is a young, wealthy man who is famous among his people for endlessly asking questions, due to a "void" in his mind which compels him to seek knowledge. Eventually, his father grants him magical boons to protect Guyal, so that he can seek the fabled Museum of Man in order to ask questions of the legendary, all-knowing Curator.
- Liane the Wayfarer, a "bandit-troubadour", is a vain, venal, overconfident, sadistic, and thoroughly amoral adventurer. He travels about seeking wealth, wine, women, and song. In order to win the affections of a beautiful witch, he sets out to steal a tapestry from a mysterious entity called Chun the Unavoidable.
- Mazirian is a wizard who will stop at nothing to obtain as much magical knowledge or power as possible. Although Mazirian, like Turjan, is capable of creating artificial life, his creations lack human intelligence. He imprisons Turjan to try to force him to give up this secret.
- Turjan is a wizard who travels to an otherworldly realm to study under the wizard Pandelume. Pandelume, grateful for being rescued from deadly peril, teaches him the secret of creating artificial life, as well as spells and sciences which are otherwise lost to human knowledge. Turjan's adventures often bring him into conflict with other wizards.
- T'sais is an artificial woman created by Pandelume, but due to an error has a flaw in her brain: T'sais finds disgusting everything she perceives and is thus consumed with hatred for all living creatures, including herself, and spends her time attempting to hunt and kill everything in sight (except Pandelume). After an encounter with T'sain, whom Turjan created from the same template but without T'sais's flaw, she attempts to control her instinctual hatred and asks Pandelume to send her to Earth. There, she encounters Etarr, who has been cursed with a hideous face by a witch. They join forces in an attempt to cure their respective ills.
- Ulan Dhor is a budding swordsman and wizard. He sets out to the city of Ampridatvir to recover a pair of ancient tablets, supposed to provide access to ancient knowledge and magic.

=== Other characters ===
- Elai is a girl who shows kindness towards Ulan Dhor, during his journey to Ampridatvir. She is a member of the grey-clad worshippers of Cazdal. Ulan informs her of the truth about the city, and she serves as his guide and companion.
- Etarr is a normal man who was unfortunate enough to fall in love with an evil witch. She used her mystical powers to exchange his face with that of a demon, cursing him with an unspeakably horrible face. However, Etarr is a kind man. After he offers help and hospitality to T'sais, she joins him on a journey to force his ex-lover to return his face. Although Etarr is not spoken of as a magician, he knows some spells which he uses to protect himself and T'sais.
- Prince Kandive the Golden, as he is called, is a decadent and indolent monarch who rules the city of Kaiin. He is also a wizard of considerable power, from whom Mazirian stole the secrets of unnaturally long life. His age is unknown. Kandive finances the expeditions of his nephew, Ulan Dhor.
- Pandelume is a mighty wizard who resides in the realm of Embelyon. Pandelume possesses knowledge of many things which are otherwise lost to mankind in Turjan's time, including the method of creating artificial life, of all the spells which have ever been invented, and of mundane sciences such as mathematics. However, he is not perfect or infallible; he created the flawed T'sais and needs Turjan to retrieve a magical relic for him in order to defeat an old foe. Although he has a physical presence, Pandelume is never seen by the other characters; apparently, the sight of him causes insanity or death.
- Rogol Domedonfors: The last ruler of the city of Ampridatvir, unable to stop the endless rioting among the people of his city, caught up in a freak religious fervor, is mortally wounded, and devises two tablets containing the key to his lore. The city, once a bastion of science, sinks into barbarism. Thousands of years later, Ulan Dhor and Etai seek to steal these tablets from the temples. In doing so, they find the surprising true purpose behind their creation.
- Shierl is the daughter of the Castellan of the Saponids. When the Saponids force Guyal to choose the most beautiful young woman in Saponce, he chooses Shierl, and inadvertently condemns her to be sacrificed to the demon Blikdak. Guyal and Shierl develop a relationship as the Saponids force him to escort her to the Museum of Man.
- T'sain is a beautiful artificial human woman created by Turjan. T'sain was created from the same "pattern" that Pandelume used to create T'sais, but T'sain does not share her mental flaw. T'sain returns with Turjan to the Dying Earth, and later rescues Turjan from Mazirian.

== Places ==
- Ampridatvir: Like Kaiin, an ancient city whose people now dwell in half-ruins.
- Ascolais: A forested country where Turjan, Mazirian, and many other wizards and strange creatures reside.
- Embelyon: a realm removed from the Earth; it may be located in a different planet or another plane of existence entirely.
- Kaiin: A city on the edge of Ascolais, ruled by Prince Kandive the Golden.
- Saponce: The city of the Saponids, a people who are ruled by ancient traditions.

== Creatures of the Dying Earth ==
- Chun the Unavoidable: A mysterious entity, species is unknown.
- Deodands: Handsome humanoids with dark skin and savage disposition.
- Pelgranes: Winged hostile creatures with beaks.
- Gauns: Roughly humanoid dangerous creatures which haunt the streets of Ampridatvir by night.
- Oasts: Creatures which appear to be giant humans.
- Twk-Men: Tiny greenish humanoids who ride on dragonflies.

== Reception ==
Rhodomagnetic Digest cited The Worm Ouroboros and Titus Groan as prototypes for The Dying Earth and concluded the book "quite possibly ranks right with them". Fanzine Destiny compared Vance to Clark Ashton Smith and raved, "THE DYING EARTH is an unforgettable reading experience, and one that in itself will carve a niche for the author in the hall of fantasy greats."

== Influence on Dungeons and Dragons ==
The need to memorize spells in order to use them became a feature of the role-playing game Dungeons & Dragons. The designer, Gary Gygax, credited the novel with being the inspiration for the magic system, which he called "Vancian". He recognized the need to throttle magic use to keep players on equal footing. The Dying Earth was listed in Appendix N of the Advanced Dungeons & Dragons Dungeon Master’s Guide as "Inspirational and Educational Reading".

== See also ==
The Dying Earth Roleplaying Game, Pelgrane Press (2001). A tabletop roleplaying game based on the novel series.
