= JJ Lee (writer) =

Canadian writer

- Education: Concordia University (BA); University of British Columbia (Masters)
- Occupations: Essayist; Editor; Professor
- Writing career
- Language: English
- Website: jj-lee.com

JJ Lee talks about The Measure of a Man: The Story of a Father, a Son, and a Suit on Bookbits radio.

JJ Lee is a Canadian writer. His debut book, The Measure of a Man: The Story of a Father, a Son, and a Suit, was published in 2011 and was shortlisted for the 2011 Governor General's Award for English non-fiction, the 2012 Charles Taylor Prize, and the 2012 Hilary Weston Writers' Trust Prize for Nonfiction.

Based in Vancouver, British Columbia, Lee is also a fashion columnist and art critic for various media outlets in Vancouver, including CBC Radio, the Vancouver Sun and the Georgia Straight, as well as a producer for CBC Radio. The Measure of a Man was originally prepared as a radio documentary on the social history of men's suits for the CBC Radio program Ideas.
