= M=SF =

Science fiction series

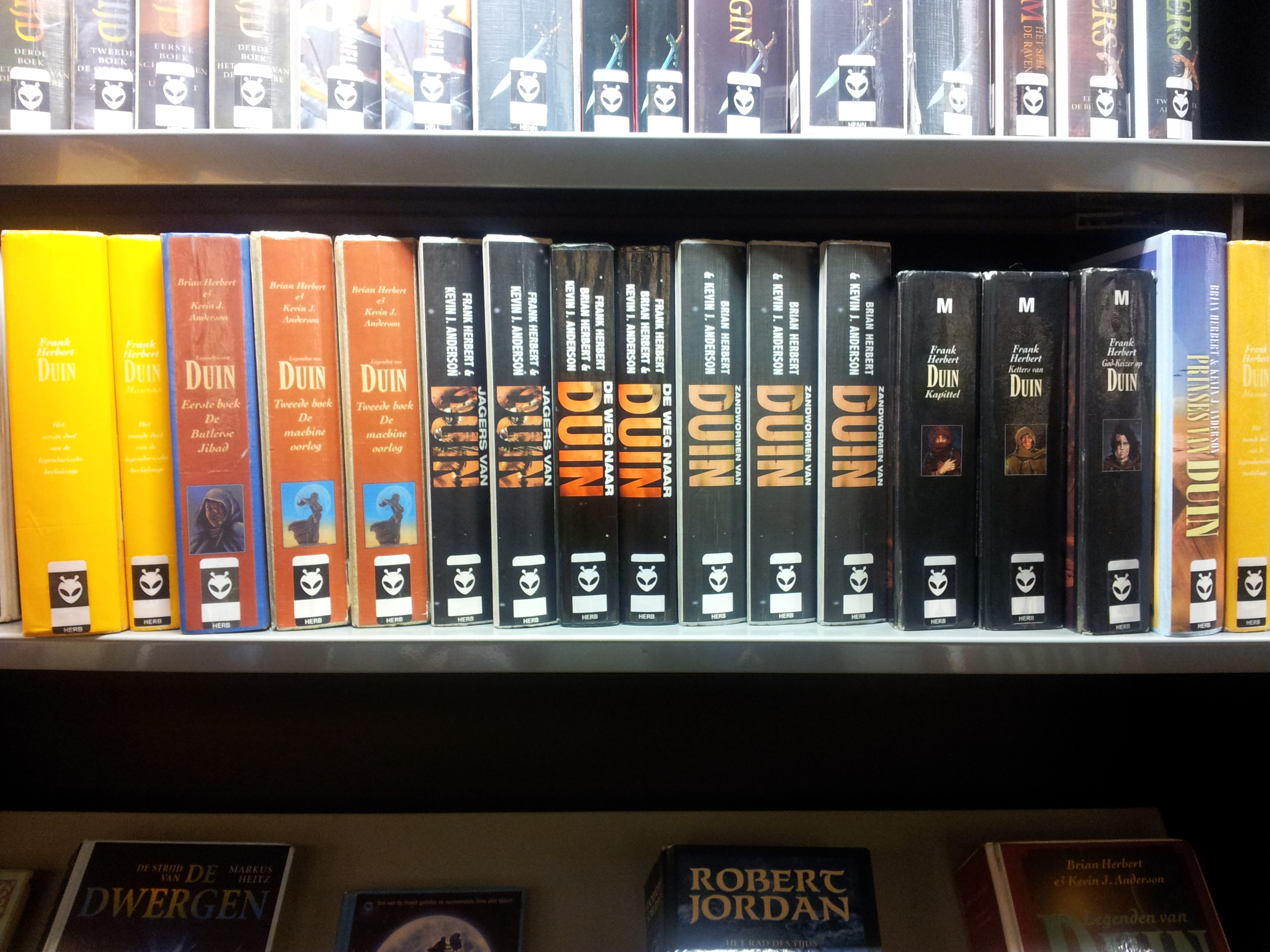
Dune books from M=SF

M=SF is a series of science fiction and fantasy novels published by the Dutch publisher Meulenhoff. The series started in 1967. It continued at the very least until 2013, when the number of books published per year was already reduced. Most titles in the series are translations from English language works, others are original Dutch language novels.

== Books in the series ==
^{(original Dutch language novels are in light orange)}

No.	Writer	Title	Original title	Year
1967				
1	Robert Heinlein	Verdwaald tussen de Sterren	Orphans of the Sky	1941
2	Isaac Asimov	De Stalen Holen	The Caves of Steel	1954
3	Poul Anderson	Vlaag van Verstand	Brain Wave	1954
4	Frederik Pohl and Cyril Kornbluth	Wolfsklauw	Wolfbane	1957
5	Harry Harrison	Doodstrijd op Pyrrus	Deathworld	1960
6	J. G. Ballard	De Brandende Aarde	The Burning World	1964
7	John Brunner	Het Rijk van de Tijd	Times Without Number	1962
8	Philip José Farmer	Binnenste Buiten	Inside Outside	1964
9	Thomas M. Disch	De Uitroeiers	The Genocides	1965
10	Avram Davidson	Wachters van het Web	Masters of the Maze	1965
1968				
11	Brian Aldiss	Sterrenhoop	Starswarm	1964
12	Isaac Asimov	De Blote Zon	The Naked Sun	1957
14	Paul van Herck	(translated in English as: Where were you last Pluterday?)	Sam, of de Pluterdag	1968
15	J. G. Ballard	De Verdronken Aarde	The Drowned World	1962
16	Jack Vance	Een stad vol Chasch	City of the Chasch	1966
17	A.E. van Vogt	De Wereld van Nul-A	The World of Null-A	1948
1969				
20	Jack Vance	De Sterrekoning	The Star King	1964
21	A.E. van Vogt	De Schakers van Nul-A	The Pawns of Null-A	1948
22	Harry Harrison	Doodstrijd op Appsala	Deathworld 2	1964
24	J. G. Ballard	De Kristallen Aarde	The Crystal World	1966
25	Jack Vance	Onder de Wankh	Servants of the Wankh	1969
1970				
28	Theodore Sturgeon	Venus Plus X	Venus Plus X	1960
32	Jack Vance	De Moordmachine	The Killing Machine	1964
35	Robert Heinlein	Het Pad van Roem	Glory Road	1963
39	Larry Niven	Neutronster	Neutron Star	1966
41	Jack Vance	De Dirdir	The Dirdir	1969
1971				
43	Ursula Le Guin	De linkerhand van het duister	The Left Hand of Darkness	1969
44	Jack Vance	Het Eeuwige Leven	To Live Forever	1956
47	Robert Heinlein	De Maan in Opstand	The Moon is a Harsh Mistress	1966
48	Jack Vance	De Pnume	The Pnume	1970
49	Philip K. Dick	Uur der Waarheid	The Penultimate Truth	1964
1972				
51	A.E. van Vogt	Tijd van Leven	Quest for the Future	1970
55	Harry Harrison	Doodstrijd op Voorspoed	Deathworld 3	1968
1973				
56	A.E. van Vogt	De Arsenalen van Isher	The Weapon Shops of Isher	1951
57	A.E. van Vogt	De Wapensmeden	The Weapon Makers	1952
58	Jack Vance	Telek	Telek	1970
59	Robert Heinlein	Zwerftocht tussen de Sterren	Citizen of the Galaxy	1957
60	Jack Vance	Het Paleis van de Liefde	The Palace of Love	1966
62	Philip José Farmer	Het Verboden Rijk	The Alley God	1973
64	Jack Vance	Emphyrio	Emphyrio	1964
65	Theodore Sturgeon	Xanadu	The Skills of Xanadu	1971
67	Jack Vance	Tschai, de waanzinnige planeet	Tschai	1970
1974				
70	Frank Herbert	Duin	Dune	1965
71	Philip K. Dick	De Spelers van Titan	The Game-Players of Titan	1963
79	Philip K. Dick	Martiaanse Tijdverschuiving	Martian Time-Slip	1964
80	Jack Vance	De ogen van de overwereld	The Eyes of the Overworld	1966
1975				
84	Jack Vance	De Drakenruiters - Grote planeet - Talen van Pao	The Dragon Masters - Big Planet - The Languages of Pao	1968
86	Frank Herbert	Duin Messias	Dune Messiah	1969
94	Philip K. Dick	Ubik	Ubik	1969
1976				
100	Jack Vance	Durdane	Durdane	1973
106	Philip K. Dick	Wacht nu op Vorig Jaar	Now Wait for Last Year	1970
1977				
115	A.E. van Vogt	Slan	Slan	1940
116	Frank Herbert	Kinderen van Duin	Children of Dune	1976
117	Theodore Sturgeon	Meer dan Menselijk	More Than Human	1953
118	Philip K. Dick	Onze Vrienden van Frolix-8	Our Friends from Frolix 8	1970
127	Jack Vance	Maske: Thaery	Maske: Thaery	1976
147	Ansen Dibell	De laatste koning	Pursuit of the Screamer	1978
1979				
146	Jack Vance	Wyst: Alastor 1716	Wyst: Alastor 1716	1978
149	Jack Vance	Lens Larque	The Face	1979
150	Philip K. Dick	Dromen Androïden van Electrische Schapen?	Do Androids Dream of Electric Sheep?	1968
1980				
157	Wim Gijsen		De Eersten van Rissan	1980
158	Phyllis Eisenstein	Alaric	Born to Exile	1979
161	Tanith Lee	Heerser van de Nacht	Night's Master	1978
1981				
162	Ansen Dibell	Ashai Rey	Circle, Crescent, Star	1981
164	Wim Gijsen		De Koningen van Weleer	1981
167	Jack Vance	Het Boek der Dromen	The Book of Dreams	1981
168	Tanith Lee	Meester van de Dood	Death's Master	1979
172	Jack Vance	Trullion: Alastor 2262	Trullion: Alastor 2262	1973
176	Ansen Dibell	Zomermarkt	Summerfair	1982
1982				
177	Terry Pratchett	Delven/De Donkere Kant van de Zon	Strata/The Dark Side of the Sun	1976
178	Tanith Lee	Meester van de Waan	Delusion's Master	1981
179	Frank Herbert	God-Keizer van Duin	God Emperor of Dune	1981
180	Wim Gijsen		Iskander de Dromendief	1982
182	Jack Vance	Marune: Alastor 933	Marune: Alastor 933	1975
1983				
183	Ad Visser		Sobriëtas	1983
185	A.E. van Vogt	Strijd om de Eeuwigheid	The Battle of Forever	1974
186	Wim Gijsen		Het Huis van de Wolf	1983
189	Isaac Asimov	Het Einde van Eeuwigheid	The End of Eternity	1955
191	Clark Ashton Smith	Zothique	Zothique	1958
192	Ansen Dibell	Stormvloedgrens	Tidestorm Limit	1982
194	Jack Vance	Spelevaren op Grote Planeet	Showboat World	1975
1984				
196	A.E. van Vogt	Nul-A 3	Null-A Three	1984
198	Jack Vance	Magnus Ridolph	The Many Worlds of Magnus Ridolph	1966
199	Jack Vance	De tuin van Suldrun	Suldrun's Garden	1984
201	Jack Vance	Cugel gewroken	Cugel's Saga	1983
202	Jack Vance	De Talen van Pao	The Languages of Pao	1957
203	Isaac Asimov	De Robots van de Dageraad	The Robots of Dawn	1983
204	Frank Herbert	Ketters van Duin	Heretics of Dune	1984
1985				
208	Tanith Lee	Het Geboortegraf	The Birthgrave	1977
209	Ansen Dibell	Gift van de Shai	The Sun of Return	1985
210	Jack Vance	Grote Planeet	Big Planet	1952
211	Tanith Lee	Vrouwe der ijlingen	Delirium's Mistress	1985
212	Jack Vance	De groene parel	The Green Pearl	1985
213	Isaac Asimov	Robots en Imperium	Robots and Empire	1985
216	Jack Vance	Rhialto de Schitterende	Rhialto the Marvellous	1985
1986				
221	Frank Herbert	Duin Kapittel	Chapterhouse: Dune	1985
223	Tanith Lee	Stormgebieder	The Storm Lord	1977
224	Tanith Lee	Anackire	Anackire	1983
225	Tanith Lee	Schaduwvuur	Vazkor, Son of Vazkor	1978
226	Tanith Lee	De Witte Heks	Quest for the White Witch	1978
228	Jack Vance	De Duivelsprinsen	The Demon Princes	1981
1987				
232	Wim Gijsen		Rissan	1987
237	Tanith Lee	Prinses van de Nacht	Night's Sorceries	1987
240	Isaac Asimov	Zelfs de Goden	The Gods Themselves	1972
241	Jack Vance	Het Laatste Kasteel	The Last Castle	1966
243	Peter Schaap		De Schrijvenaar van Thyll	1987
1988				
250	Tanith Lee	Het Witte Serpent	The White Serpent	1988
251	Orson Scott Card	Spreker voor de Doden	Speaker for the Dead	1986
254	Ursula Le Guin	De Ontheemde	The Dispossessed	1974
255	Jack Vance	Madouc	Madouc	1990
261	Orson Scott Card	Ender Wint	Ender's Game	1985
243	Peter Schaap		Ondeeds de Loutere	1988
1989				
270	Tanith Lee	Cyrion en andere magistrale verhalen	Cyrion	1985
271	William Gibson	Zenumagiër	Neuromancer	1984
275	Peter Schaap		De Wolver	1989
1990				
276	William Gibson	Biochips	Count Zero	1986
283	Isaac Asimov	Nemesis	Nemesis	1989
287	Jack Vance	Alastor	Alastor	1978
1991				
292	William Gibson	Mona Lisa Overdrive	Mona Lisa Overdrive	1988
295	Tanith Lee	Het Bloed van Rozen	The Blood of Roses	1990
296	William Gibson	Technopunk SF	Burning Chrome	1986
298	Orson Scott Card	Xenocide	Xenocide	1990
1992				
301	Robert Heinlein	Vreemdeling in een vreemd land	Stranger in a Strange Land	1961
1993				
315	Tanith Lee	Ara	A Heroine of the World	1990
1995				
331	Tanith Lee	Vrouwe van het Duister	Vivia	1995
1996				
335	Jack Vance	Nachtlamp	Night Lamp	1996
341	Robert Heinlein	Starship Troopers: Troepen voor de Sterren	Starship Troopers	1959
343	William Gibson	Idoru	Idoru	1996
