= Jean-Pierre Gabriel =

Belgian photographer, writer and journalist

- Born: January 11, 1955 (age 71); Wiers, Wallonia, BE
- Education: Agronomy, Gembloux Agro-Bio Tech – Université de Liège, BE
- Occupations: Photographer, writer, journalist, consultant
- Known for: Photography, Writing
- Website: https://www.jeanpierregabriel.eu/

Jean-Pierre Gabriel (né Lebailly, born in Wiers, Belgium, on January 11, 1955) is a Belgian photographer, writer, journalist and consultant whose work often combines visual imagery and cultural storytelling. His photographic practice explores subjects such as architecture, gardens, interior design, gastronomy and cultural landscapes.

Gabriel describes his photographic work as follows:

My work is all about perspective; it's primarily a search for composition. The idea is to isolate scenes, whether the subject is distant or close-up, and to use what's available to me to bring them to life. This essentially involves the different qualities of light and what affects them, such as the emergence of morning dew, the clarity of a sky after rain, or the weight of clouds on the horizon before a storm.

== Early years ==
Born on a small dairy farm in the countryside, he retains a love of nature and landscapes from his childhood years. After studying agronomy in Gembloux, he spent his early working life as a political advisor to the French-speaking Belgian ministries of the Environment and Culture. In this context, he was notably at the initiative, in 1983, of Tree Day, which takes place on November 25.

== Writing and publishing ==
In addition to articles published in numerous magazines, his editorial output focuses mainly on books. His publications cover the fields of architecture (Glenn Sestig, Christophe Gevers), gardens (Erik Dhont, Piet Blanckaert, Wirtz International) or gastronomy (Sang Hoon Degeimbre, Marie Trignon) (see bibliography for the complete list). He is also the author of The Essentials: Contemporary Cuisine. In 1994, he published his first book on the Wittamer patisserie in Brussels. Many of his cookbooks have won a Gourmand World Cookbook Awards.

=== Venice ===
Jean-Pierre Gabriel's engagement with Venice is not limited to cookbooks or culinary focus – he also contributes as a photographer to books and catalogues about Venetian architecture and art. Visually documenting and interpret Venetian cultural heritage, from the Doge's Palace (Giandomenico Romanelli) to museum exhibitions at Palazzo Fortuny with Axel Vervoordt.

=== Thailand ===
Between 2011 and 2012, he explored most of the provinces of Thailand with the aim of collecting authentic recipes from amateur cooks. A large selection (over 500) was published in Thailand the Cookbook, considered as an encyclopedia of Thai cuisine.

== Consulting career ==
At the same time, he developed a career as a consultant, mainly in the food industry. In this capacity, he has curated gastronomic events such as The Flemish Primitives in Belgium (2011) and the Seoul Food Festival in Korea.

=== Korea ===
Gabriel worked as a consultant for the Seoul Gourmet International Haute Cuisine Festival and Seoul Food Festival. In that capacity, he partnered with Korean and international culinary figures – showing his engagement with Korea's contemporary food scene.

=== Tunisia ===
From 1993 to 2025 he advised Les Moulins Mahjoub, a family business that promotes Berber culture. He collaborated on the development of the product range and communication around the brand's products and values.

== Gallery ==
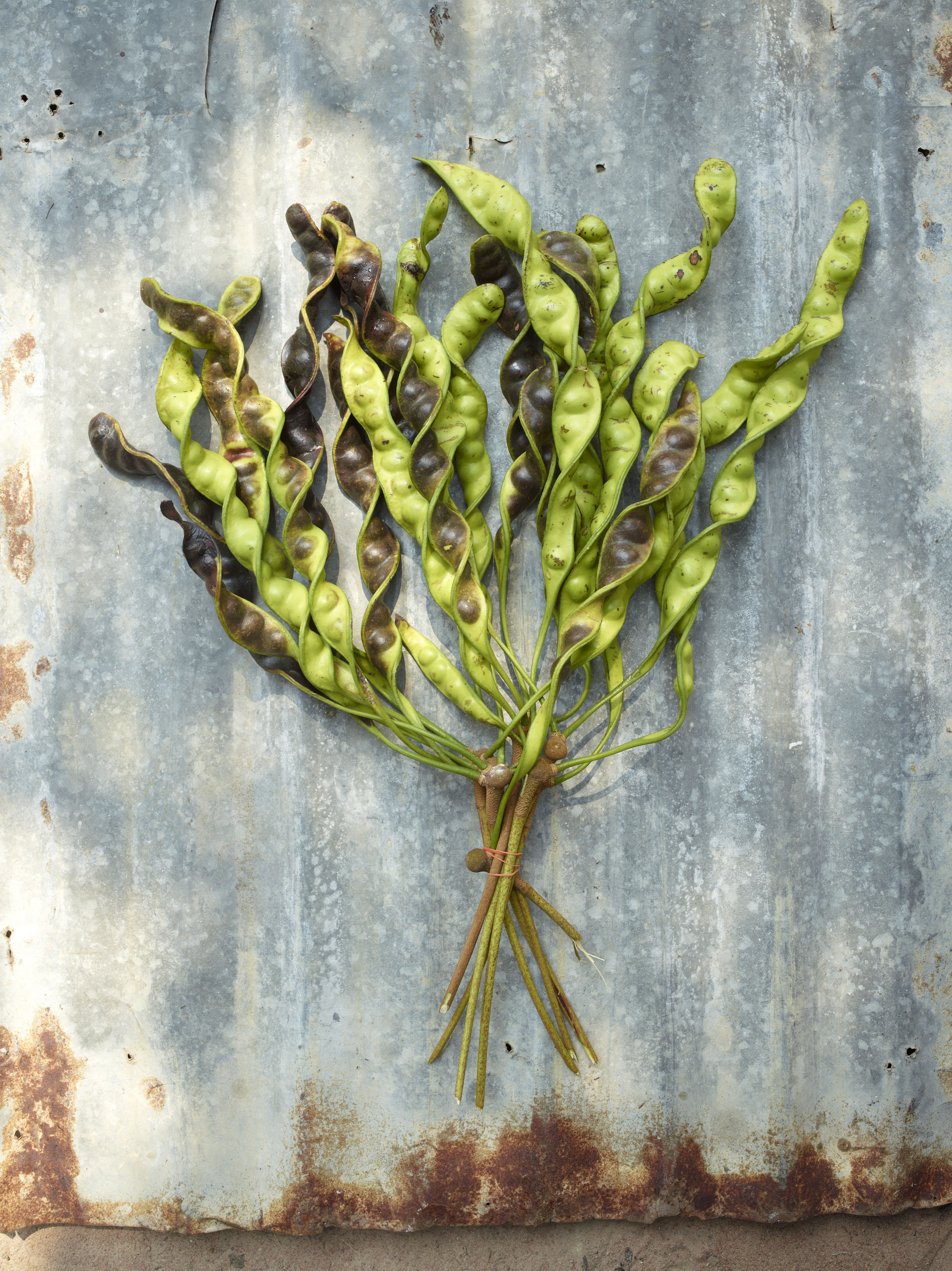
Parkia speciosa (bitter bean, stink bean or petai) from Thailand

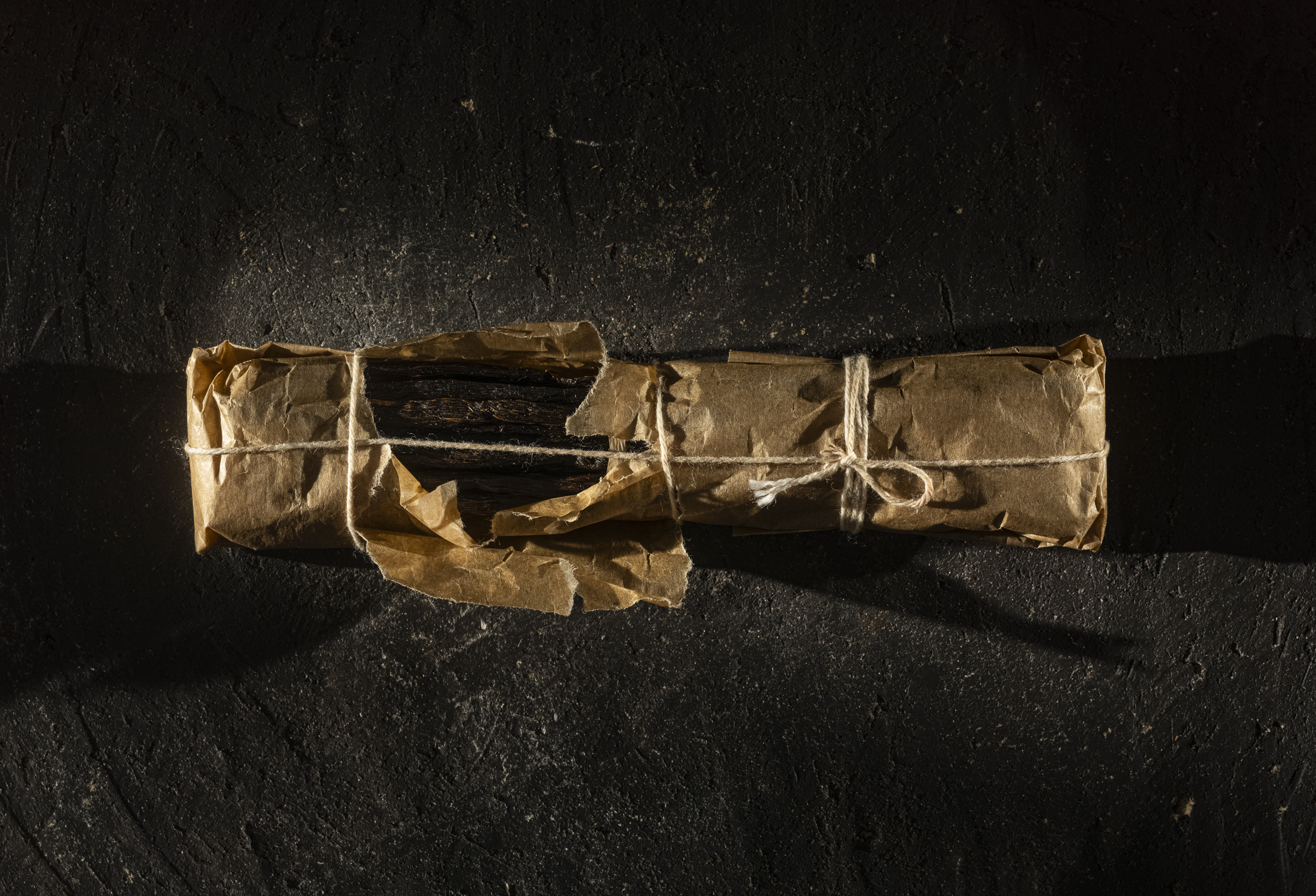
Black vanilla

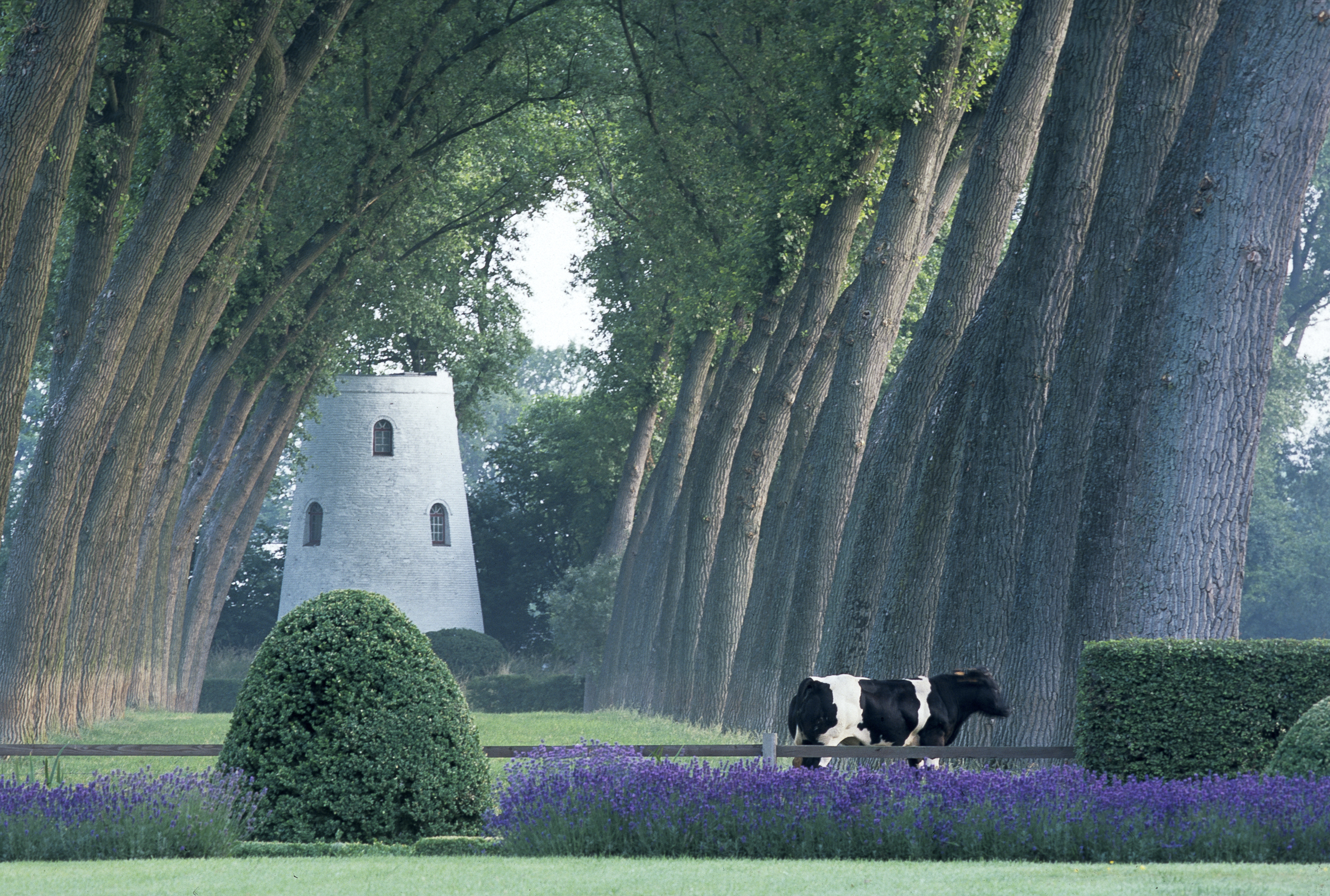
Park of Oostkerke Castle (Damme, BE)

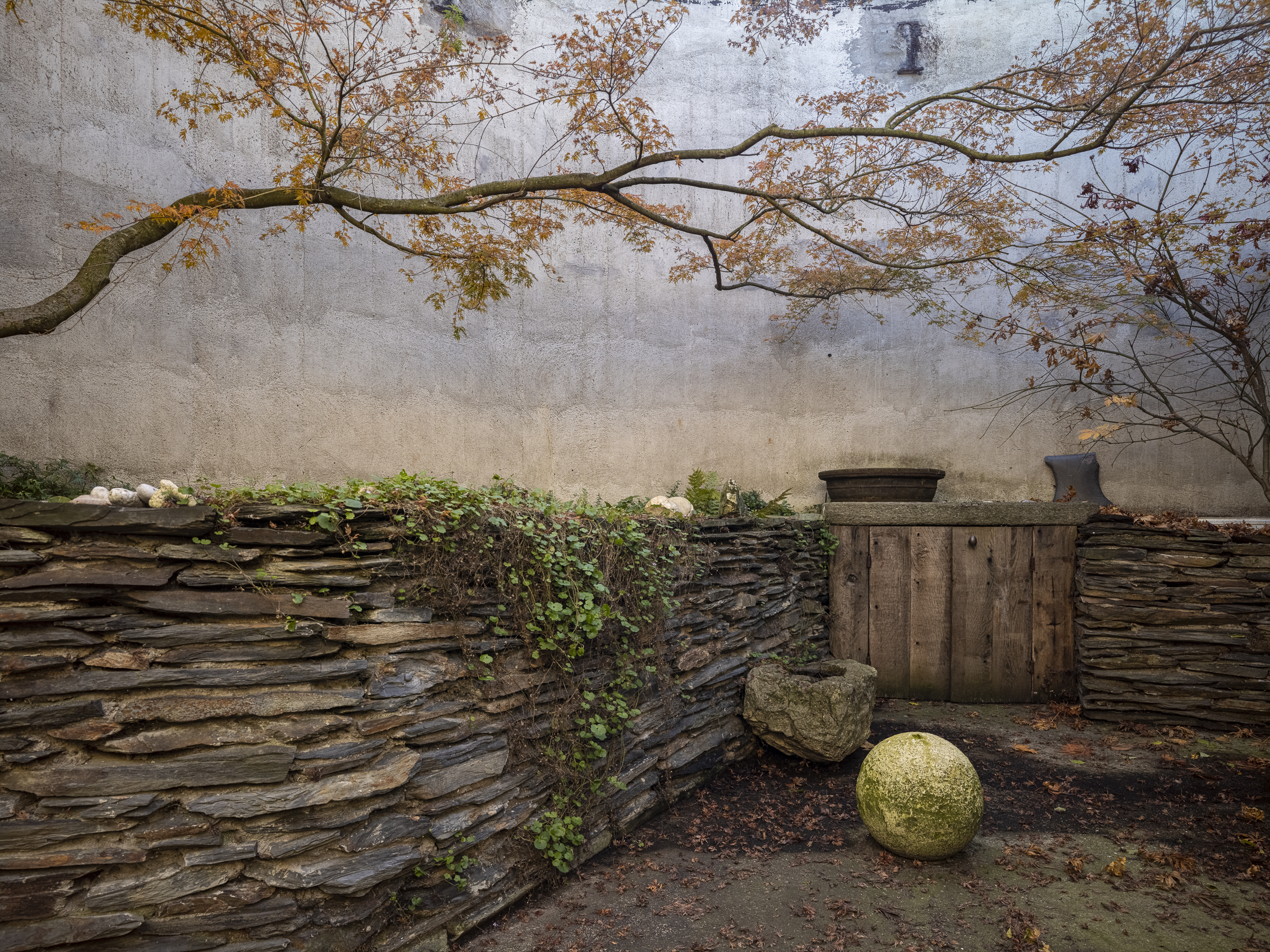
Kanaal, a project by Erik Dhont in Antwerp (BE)

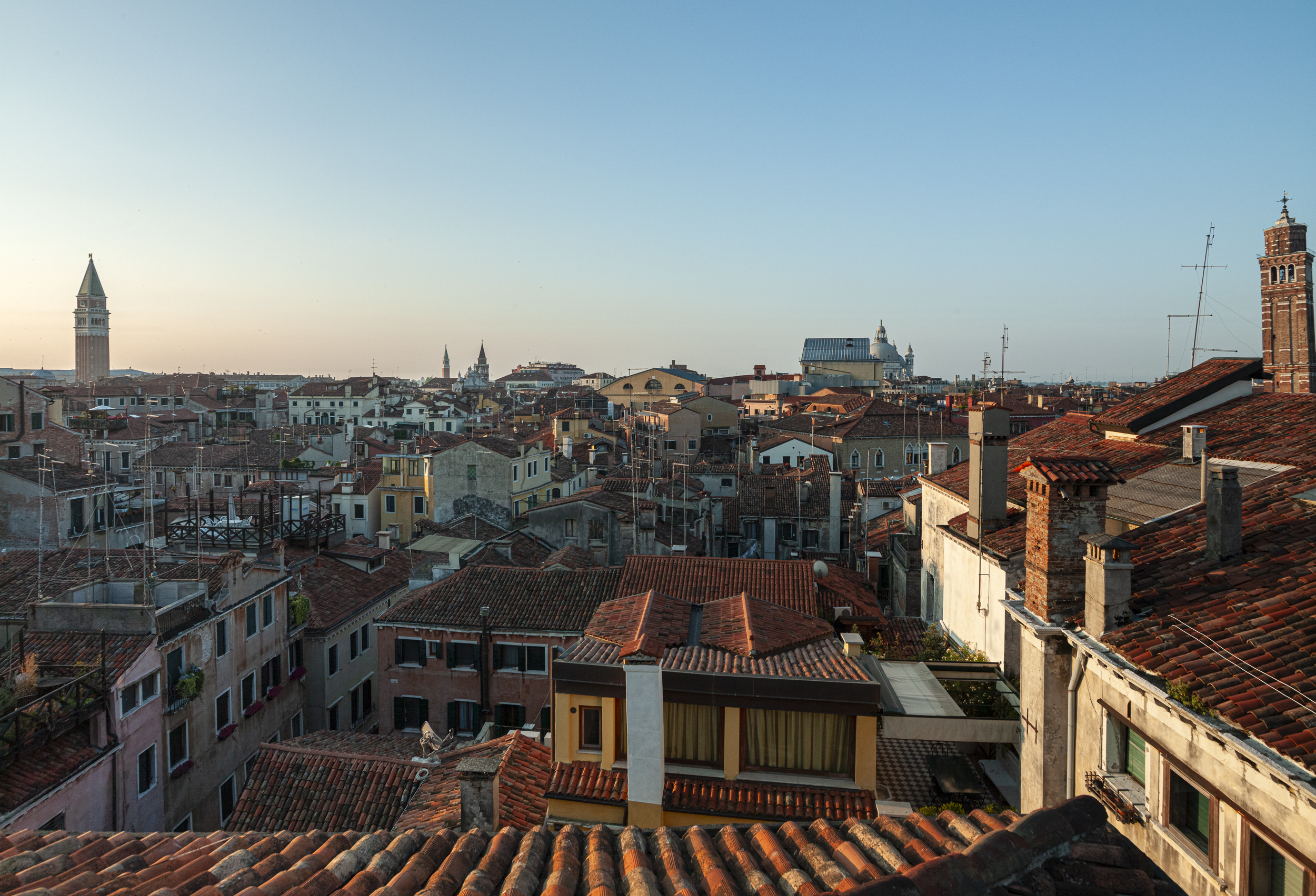
Venice skyline

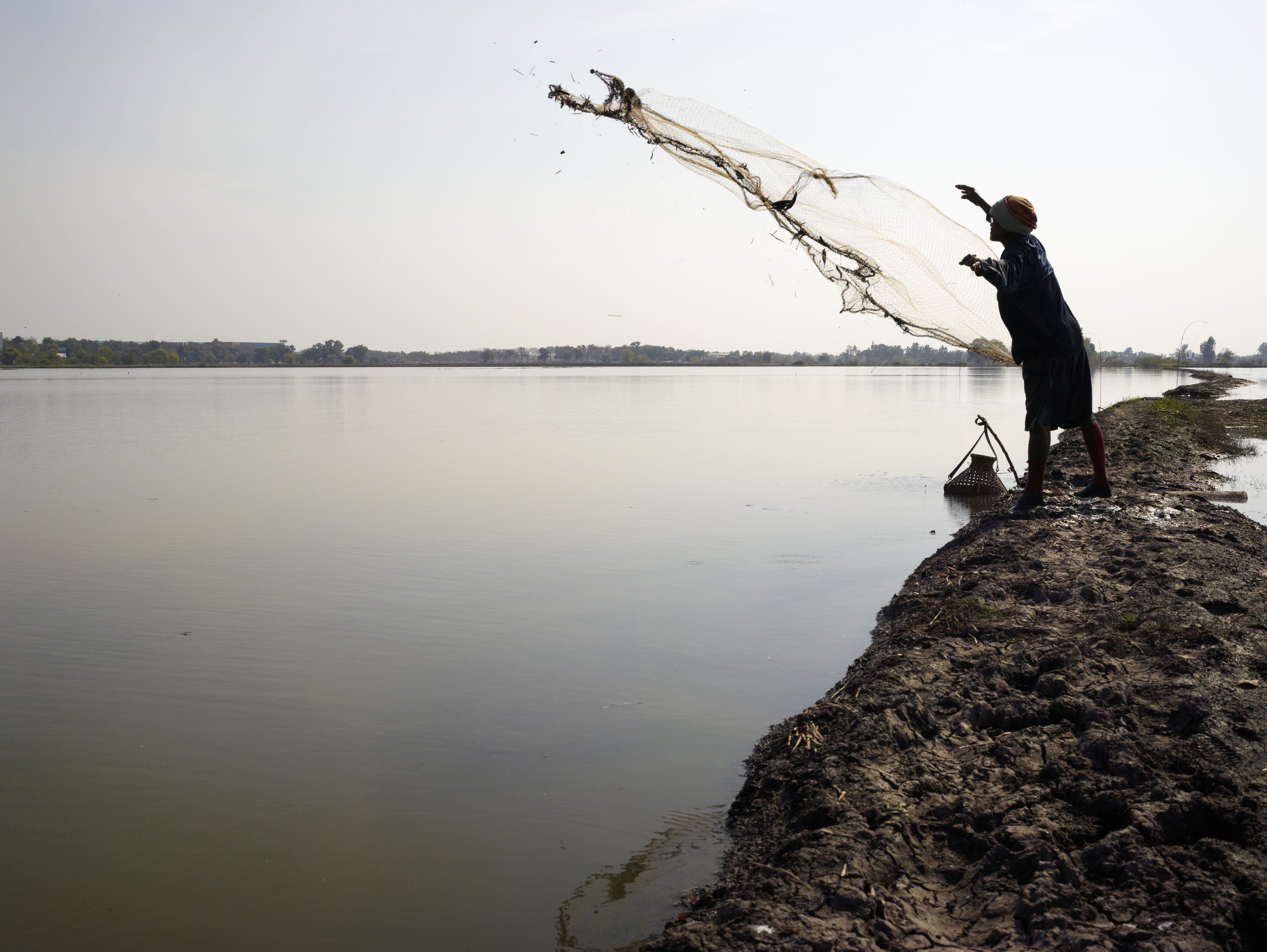
Fisherman in Thailand

== Bibliography ==
=== As photographer ===
==== Garden/garden architecture ====
- Mia Gevaert, Getijden in de tuin. Gevaert Editions. 1997
- Het leven begint in de herfst – Vier Seizoenen in het Arboretum Kalmthout. with Jelena De Belder. Lannoo. 1998
- België Land van Tuinen – Een Wereld van Vormen. Roularta Books. 2010
- Erik Dhont Landscape Architects. Works 1999–2020. Hatje Cantz. 2021

==== Architecture/art ====
- Vervoordt, Axel. Artempo, Where Time Becomes Art. Mer Paper Kunsthalle. 2007
- Un mondo di carta. Isabelle de Borchgrave incontra Mariano Fortuny. Skira. 2008
- Vervoordt, Axel. Academia: Qui es-tu?. Mer Paper Kunsthalle. 2008
- Vervoordt, Axel. In-Finitum. Mer Paper Kunsthalle. 2009
- Mariano Fortuny, La Seta e il Velluto Skira. Skira. 2010
- Marco Tirelli. Skira. 2010
- Alberto Zorzi. Allemandi. 2010
- Venice, The Doge's palace. Fondazione Musei Civici Venezia, Skira, Marsilio. 2010
- Museo Correr, Marsilio. Fondazione Musei Civici Venezia, Skira. 2010
- Ca’pesaro – Galleria Internazionale d’Arte Moderna. Fondazione Musei Civici Venezia, Skira, Marsilio. 2011
- Ca’Pesaro – The Palace, the Collections. Fondazione Musei Civici Venezia, Skira, Marsilio. 2011
- Romanelli, Giandomenico. Palazzo Ducale Venezia. Fondazione Musei Civici Venezia, Skira, Marsilio. 2011
- Vervoordt, Axel. TRA. Edge of Becoming. Vervoordt Foundation, Mer Paper Kunsthalle. 2011
- d’Arenberg Frescobaldi, Fiammetta & Gabriel, Jean-Pierre. Les plus beaux Intérieurs de Bruxelles. Lannoo. 2011
- d’Arenberg Frescobaldi, Fiammetta & Gabriel, Jean-Pierre. Living with Art in Belgium. Lannoo. 2018
- L’Esprit Souterrain. Pommery Experience No. 14. Beaux Arts Magazine (special issue). 2020
- Art Africain au Musée Van Buren. Museum van Buren. 2020
- Glenn Sestig, Architectural Diary. Oscar Riera Ojeda Publishers. 2020
- Florine Asch A wonderful World, Un monde merveilleux. Flammarion. 2025

==== Cookbooks ====
- Vitalité Gourmande (with Françoise De Keuleneer). Françoise Blouard. 2004
- Couleur Santé–Gezonde Kleur. Françoise Blouard. 2008
- Sergio Herman, Peter Goossens & Roger Van Damme: haalbare toprecepten stap voor stap. Borgerhoff & Lamberigts. 2010
- Shock-o-latier, Dominique Persoone. Njam. 2012
- At Home with May and Axel Vervoordt. Flammarion. 2012
- Venice on a Plate with Enrica Rocca. Rizzoli. November 2013 (Best Food History Book Gourmand World Cookbook awards – 2013)
- Truffles (with Ken Hom). Serindia. 2014
- Rocca, Enrica. Venise gourmande et Créative. Editions des Falaises. 2016
- Le Chant du Pain (with Paul Magnette). La Renaissance du Livre. 2019 (Best Food Photography Book of the year Gourmand World Cookbook awards – 2020)
- Tuscan Celebrations. Françoise de Keuleneer. 2024 (Best Food Photography Gourmand World Cookbook awards 2025)

=== As author and photographer ===
==== Garden/garden architecture ====
- Erik Dhont jardins, paysages de l’invisible. Ludion. 2001
- België Land van Tuinen – Een Wereld van Bloemen. Roularta Books. 2009
- België Land van Tuinen – Een Wereld van Bloemen. Roularta Books. 2010
- The Gardens at Bellem. Private collection. December 2013
- A Japanese Garden. Private collection. December 2016
- Arbres de mémoire, un Jardin d’Eden. Private collection. May 2018
- Piet Blanckaert Gardens (with Caroline Donald). Hatje Cantz. 2024

==== Architecture/art ====
- Glenn Sestig Architects, First Regards. Imschoot Uitgevers. 2002
- Glenn Sestig, Cosmopolitan Interiors. Beta +. 2008
- Christophe Gevers, monograph. Edited by Jean-Pierre Gabriel. 2024

==== Cookbooks ====
- Wittamer, Les heures et les jours – les 100 meilleures recettes de l’atelier Wittamer. Lannoo. 1994
- Chez Bru, Les saveurs de ma Provence. Stichting Kunstboek. 2003
- Vitalité Gourmande (with Françoise De Keuleneer). Françoise Blouard. 2004
- Cook + Book, Le Pain Quotidien. Françoise Blouard. 2005
- La cuisine vapeur expliquée (with Yves Mattagne). Miele. 2006
- L’Air du Temps, Cooking & Casting (with Sang Hoon Degeimbre). Françoise Blouard. 2007
- Matière Chocolat (with Stéphane Leroux). Françoise Blouard. 2008 (Best in the World – Gourmand World Cookbook awards – 2008)
- Cacao, Une expédition au Mexique. Françoise Blouard. 2008 (Best Chocolate Book Gourmand World Cookbook awards – 2008)
- Couleur Santé-Gezonde Kleur. Françoise Blouard. 2008
- Les Essentiels: La cuisine contemporaine. Unilever Foodsolutions. 2009
- Sergio Herman, Peter Goossens & Roger Van Damme: haalbare toprecepten stap voor stap. Borgerhoff & Lamberigts. 2010
- The Essentials: Contemporary Cuisine. Unilever Foodsolutions. 2009
- Le Herve, Bien plus qu’un fromage (with Fabienne Effertz). Jean-Pierre Gabriel. 2012 (Best Cheese Book Gourmand World Cookbook awards – 2012)
- Arabelle Meirlaen, Ma Cuisine intuitive. Jean-Pierre Gabriel. 2012
- Le Pain Quotidien Cookbook (with Alain Coumont & Mitchell Beazley) (Best of the Best Gourmand World Cookbook awards 1995–2025)
- Thailand The Cookbook. Phaidon. 2014 (Best Asian Cuisine Cookbook Gourmand World Cookbook awards – 2014 and Best of the Best Asian Cuisine (1995–2015)
- Thai Quick and Easy. Phaidon. 2017 (Best Photography Book of the year Gourmand World Cookbook awards – 2017)
- Le Coq Aux Champs (with Christophe Pauly). La Renaissance du Livre. 2021 (Prix littéraire Prince Alexandre de Belgique 2022)
- Le Pain Quotidien. Tartine Confidential (with Alain Coumont). 2021 (Best corporate book Gourmand World Cookbook awards 2022)
- Les Recettes de La Roseraie, Marie Trignon. 2024 (Best Authors and Chefs Gourmand World Cookbook awards 2025)
