= Dhont =

Dhont is a Belgian surname. Notable people with the surname include:

- Camille Dhont (born 2001), Belgian singer and actress
- Elena Dhont (born 1998), Belgian footballer
- Erik Dhont (born 1962), Belgian landscape architect
- Galuëlle Dhont, French gymnast
- Lukas Dhont, Belgian film director and screenwriter
