= Peter Schaap =

Dutch singer and writer (1946–2025)

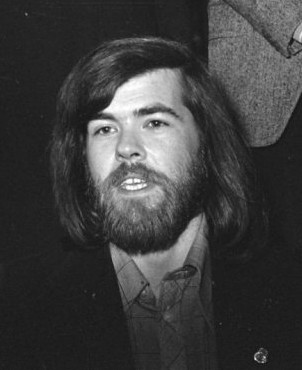
Peter Schaap

Peter Schaap (24 October 1946 – 3 January 2025) was a Dutch singer and writer.

== Life and career ==
Schaap was born in Groningen. He started his music career in 1974. He released four LPs and a CD. After 1982 he turned to writing and wrote several children's books and science fiction and fantasy novels. He was published in the M=SF range of the Dutch publisher Meulenhoff.

Schaap died on 3 January 2025, at the age of 78.

== Discography ==
- Als de trein rijdt naar het westen (1975)
- Als een kameleon (1975)
- Achter Atlantis (1976)
- Peter Schaap (1994)

== Bibliography ==
=== Children and youth books ===
- Prinses Esmarijntje en de wensdiamant (1975)
- De floepstengel (1976)
- De frietmobiel (1976)
- Het opmeneertje (1976)
- Avontuur aan de hudsonbaai (1981)
- Het gouden schip : een avontuur in het oude egypte (1986)
- Het kind in de emmer en andere verhalen (1992)
- De winter van de mammoet (1993)
- Storm aan de witte kust (1994)
- Vlucht door de vennen (1995)
- Gravers (1996)
- De bende van Michalis (1997)
- Beeldhouwer voor de farao (2000)
- Teun Palm (2008)
- Emy Vels (2008)
- Akan van het hunebed (2009)

=== Fantasy ===
- De schrijvenaar van Thyll (1987)
- Ondeeds de Loutere (1988)
- De wolver (1989)
- Tweesprook (1990) (kort verhaal - 1 band samen met Wim Gijsen)
- Kalyndra (1990) (=Wolver deel 2)
- Wolversdochter (1991) (=Wolver deel 3)
- De bruiden van Tyobar (1992)
- Zonen van chaos (1993)
- Het woud van de maker (1999)
- De vallei van de geesten (1999)
- Schaduw en elfenvuur (2000) (= Schaduwmeesters deel 1)
- Schaduw en dwergenstaal (2002) (= Schaduwmeesters deel 2)
- Schaduw en drakenstof (2003) (= Schaduwmeesters deel 3)
- Stormbreker (2008)

=== Prehistoric fantasy ===
- Ogen van ivoor (1994) (Tetralogie deel 1)
- Het teken van het steppenpaard (1996) (Tetralogie deel 2)
- Kinderen van de aardvrouw (1996) (Tetralogie deel 3)
- Het lied van de steen (1999) (Tetralogie deel 4)
