= Yoran Brondsema =

Belgian entrepreneur and author

Yoran Brondsema is a Belgian entrepreneur and author. He is co-founder with business partner Thomas Ketchell, of education start-up Sutori in 2013 and finance investment platform, Curvo in 2021.

In 2018, he was named one of the ’30 Under 30’ in education by Forbes magazine.

He is co-author with Tim Nijsmans of ‘De Hangmatbelegger’ a book on passive investing in Belgium through Exchange Traded Funds (ETFs) which was published in Flemish in 2023 and French in 2024.

== Businesses ==
Sutori is an online education platform launched by Brondsema and business partner, Thomas Ketchell in 2013. According to its website, it has 2.75 million students and educators currently using the platform.

Curvo is a finance investment platform for Belgian investors launched by Brondsema and Ketchell in 2021. It raised €500,000 in seed funding in 2023 and according to its website, it holds €26.9 million on behalf of 5,700 customers.

== Books ==
Brondsema co-authored a guide to passive investing via ETFs in Belgium with Tim Nijsmans. In September 2023, 'De Hangmatbelegger' was published by Lannoo in Flemish. A French version, ‘Comment Gagner en Bourse sans se Fatiguer’, was published in November 2024 by Editions Racine.

As of April 2025, the book has sold 30,000 copies.
