= Where were you last Pluterday? =

1968 novel by Paul van Herck

- First edition
- Author: Paul van Herck
- Original title: Sam, of de Pluterdag
- Translator: Danny de Laet and Willy Magiels
- Language: Dutch
- Genre: Science fiction
- Publisher: M=SF (Meulenhoff)
- Publication date: 1968
- Publication place: Belgium
- English publication date: 1973
- Media type: Paperback
- Pages: 159 (Dutch)
- ISBN: 0-87997-051-0
- OCLC: 280819909
- Dewey Decimal: 839.3 (Dutch); 823 (English)

Where were you last Pluterday? is a serio-comic science fiction novel by Paul van Herck, originally released in Dutch in 1968 as Sam, of de Pluterdag by J.M. Meulenhoff (in their science fiction and fantasy range M=SF as the 14th book of the range) and released in English by DAW books in 1973.

The novel won the first prize at the European Science Fiction Convention (EuroCon) in Trieste, Italy.

== Plot summary ==
The theme in the book is Pluterday, an extra day in the week which can be withdrawn if one saves enough time (e.g. by taking a plane instead of a train). Only the rich can save enough time and thus Pluterday is in practice reserved for the "happy few", resulting in a class society. The existence of Pluterdays is kept secret from non-privileged people.

== Other translations ==
- Spanish (Mexico: Novaro, 1975: translated by Manuel Campo as ¿Dónde Estabas el Pasado Pluterday?)
- Swedish (Stockholm/Bromma: Delta, 1976: translated by Gunnar Gällmo as Vi ses på plurdag, ISBN 91-7228-092-1)
- French (Paris: Librairie des Champs-Elysées, 1977: translated by Mary Rosenthal as Crésudi dernier ?, ISBN 2-7024-0602-5)
- German (München: Heyne Verlag, 1981: translated by Ronald M. Hahn as Framstag Sam, ISBN 3-453-30695-3)
- Hungarian (Budapest: Háttér Lap- és Könyvkiado, 1991: translated by Anikó Kocsis as Viszlát jövő plutónap!, ISBN 963-7455-17-5)
