= The Dirdir =

1969 novel by Jack Vance

- First edition
- Author: Jack Vance
- Cover artist: Jeff Jones
- Language: English
- Series: Planet of Adventure
- Genre: Science fiction
- Publisher: Ace Books
- Publication date: 1969
- Publication place: United States
- Media type: Print (Paperback)
- Pages: 188
- Preceded by: Servants of the Wankh
- Followed by: The Pnume

The Dirdir is a science fiction adventure novel by American writer Jack Vance, the third in the tetralogy Tschai, Planet of Adventure. It tells of the efforts of the sole survivor of the destruction of a human starship to return to Earth from the distant planet Tschai.

== Plot summary ==
Adam Reith is stranded on Tschai, a distant planet shared by four alien, mutually hostile, advanced species (the Chasch, Wankh, Dirdir and native Pnume). On his quest to get home, he acquires two human companions, Traz Onmale, a teenage barbarian chieftain, and Ankhe at afram Anacho, an outcast Dirdirman.

Reith has failed twice to acquire a spaceship (as recounted in City of the Chasch and Servants of the Wankh). His exploits bring him to the unwanted attention of the Dirdir. As Anacho explains, his former masters are rarely subtle: they want to question and then kill him. Reith manages to wipe out the first "Initiative" sent after him, but sooner or later, there will be a second.

He decides to build a ship from scratch, a task requiring vast amounts of sequins, the universal currency of Tschai. The only way to raise that much quickly is to brave the Carabas, the Dirdir hunting preserve, where sequins grow as crystalline nodes. Men prospect for the nodes, while the Dirdir hunt the men. Those they catch, they eat.

Reith turns the tables on the Dirdir. He ambushes their hunting parties and takes the sequins they acquired from their victims. When the Dirdir finally take notice, Reith and his friends barely manage to escape, but they have amassed a fortune; in fact, they have so many sequins, they are forced to leave behind a substantial hidden cache.

They journey to the cosmopolitan city of Sivishe, where there are shipyards. They find that they must deal with Aila Woudiver, an enormously obese man with monstrous appetites. The construction of the spaceship progresses satisfactorily, but Woudiver demands ever more money, threatening to turn them over to the Dirdir if he is not paid. Finally, Reith has no choice but to go back to the Carabas to retrieve the hidden sequins, leaving Traz and Anacho to keep watch.

When he returns however, he finds that Woudiver, who desires above all else to be a Dirdirman, has betrayed Anacho to the Dirdir. Reith risks his life rescuing Anacho. Then he goes to confront Woudiver, but the arch-criminal is too clever for him and all three are handed over to the Dirdir.

However, Reith demands arbitration, invoking a tradition too strong for the Dirdir to ignore, even from a "subman". When the judgment goes against him, he challenges the Dirdirman arbitrator. By Dirdir custom, the victor of hand-to-hand combat wins the case. Reith dispatches his foe, only to face a second set of charges. This time, he has to fight a Dirdir. When he forces the creature to concede, Reith and his friends are absolved of all crimes and freed. Needing Woudiver to complete the ship, they do not kill him, but take him captive.

== Reception ==
Tony Watson reviewed the series for Different Worlds magazine and stated that "The potential for adventure on Tschai is rich. The Chasch, Dirdir, Pnume, Wankh and their submen are constantly scheming and sparring with one another, providing ample opportunity for intrigue and fighting."

== Reviews ==
- Review by John Boardman (1970) in Science Fiction Review, February 1970
- Review by Peter Hyde (1975) in Vector 70 Autumn 1975
- Review by Mark Adlard (1977) in Foundation, #11 and 12 March 1977
- Review by Jerry L. Parsons (1979) in Science Fiction & Fantasy Book Review, October 1979
