= In the Hands of Glory =

- Cover of the 1981 Pocket Books edition
- Author: Phyllis Eisenstein
- Language: English
- Publication date: 1981

In the Hands of Glory is a 1981 novel written by Phyllis Eisenstein.

== Plot summary ==
In the Hands of Glory is a novel in which the principled fighter pilot Dia is shot down and rescued by two rebels—a gifted humanoid doctor and a charming, intelligent alien resembling a koala. Though loyal to her government, Dia is hidden and protected by her captors, who later help her escape. Upon returning home, she is celebrated as a heroine but reassigned to serve as an assistant to the city's most powerful man—a role steeped in sexual politics. In this society, women are expected to advance through intimate liaisons, and Dia's mother even encourages her to comply. Dia does so strategically, gaining proximity to power. As she grows closer to the Brigadier, Dia uncovers disturbing truths about her government's origins and operations. A forbidden history book sparks her curiosity, and the brutal treatment of her former rescuers forces her to reevaluate her beliefs.

== Reception ==
Debye Pruitt reviewed In the Hands of Glory for Pegasus magazine and stated that "If you want to spend a pleasant afternoon or two reading an enjoyable, not too strenuous book, I suggest that In the Hands of Glory is a more-than-adequate choice."

== Reviews ==
- Review by Charles Platt (1982) in The Patchin Review, Number Three, January 1982
- Review by Gene DeWeese (1982) in Science Fiction Review, Spring 1982
- Review by Baird Searles (1982) in Isaac Asimov's Science Fiction Magazine, March 15, 1982
- Review by Thomas A. Easton [as by Tom Easton] (1982) in Analog Science Fiction/Science Fact, March 29, 1982
- Review by Ian Williams (1982) in Vector 107
- Review by Fred D'Ignazio (1982) in Science Fiction & Fantasy Book Review, #3, April 1982
