= Ansen Dibell =

American novelist

- Born: Nancy Ann Dibble; September 8, 1942; Staten Island, New York
- Died: March 7, 2006
- Occupation(s): Writer, educator

Ansen Dibell was the pen name used by Nancy Ann Dibble (September 8, 1942 – March 7, 2006), an American science fiction author and poet, who also published books about fiction writing.

== Early life and education ==
Dibble was from Staten Island, New York, the daughter of Ralph M. Dibble and Barbara J. Waterman Dibble. Her father was an engineer. She attended Keuka College, graduating in 1964; at Keuka, she was active in campus radio and student publications. She received a Master of Fine Arts degree (MFA) from the Iowa Writers' Workshop and earned a doctorate in 19th-century English literature.

== Career ==
Dibell taught literature and creative writing at several colleges and universities, including Northern Kentucky University, and her alma mater Keuka College. In 1980, she became a freelance editor and author. From 1983 she worked as editor at Writer's Digest Books. She also spoke at conferences for aspiring writers. She lived in Clifton, Ohio from 1976. She died in 2006, at the age of 63, in Cincinnati.

== Works ==
Dibell published a number of stories and poems in The Magazine of Fantasy & Science Fiction and received two awards for her poetry. She also wrote non-fiction, including several books about writing. Her fiction involved "space settlements and the aftermath of the technology which established them," according to one 1982 profile.

=== The King of Kantmorie ===
- Pursuit of the Screamer, DAW Books, June 1978, ISBN 0-87997-386-2
  - De laatste koning, Dutch edition (M=SF), ISBN 90-290-1031-2
- Circle, Crescent, Star, DAW Books, February 1981, ISBN 0-87997-603-9
  - Ashai Rey, Dutch edition (M=SF), ISBN 90-290-1016-9
- Summerfair, DAW Books, July 1982, ISBN 0-87997-759-0
  - Zomermarkt, Dutch edition (M=SF)
- Tidestorm Limit, 1983, (published in Dutch and French translations only)
  - Stormvloedgrens, Dutch edition (M=SF)
  - Aux confins de l'ouragan, French edition
- The Sun of Return, 1985 (published in Dutch and French translations only)
  - Gift van de Shai, Dutch edition (M=SF)
  - Le soleil du grand retour, French edition

=== Other fiction ===
- "A Sense of Family" (1972)

=== Non-fiction ===
- Plot: Elements of Fiction Writing, Writer's Digest Books, August 1988, ISBN 0-89879-303-3
  - Paperback edition: Writer's Digest Books, August 1999, ISBN 0-89879-946-5
- Word Processing Secrets for Writers (with Michael A. Banks), Writer's Digest Books, March 1989, ISBN 0-89879-348-3
- How to Write a Million: The Complete Guide to Becoming a Successful Author (with Orson Scott Card, Lewis Turco, and Michael Ridpath), Constable Robinson, January 1995, ISBN 1-85487-367-9
