= In the Western Tradition =

"In the Western Tradition" is a science fiction short story by Phyllis Eisenstein. It was first published in The Magazine of Fantasy and Science Fiction, in March 1981.

== Synopsis ==
Alison is a time viewer technician supervising research into the Old West, who becomes fixated on one of the long-dead subjects of the project's surveillance.

== Reception ==
"In the Western Tradition" was a finalist for the 1982 Hugo Award for Best Novella, and for the Nebula Award for Best Novella of 1981.

James Nicoll considered it to be a "gem". Steven H. Silver, however, found the story to be "a little on the long side", and faulted it for not adequately resolving issues surrounding Alison's romance with her coworker Barry.
