= GURPS Planet of Adventure =

Role-playing game supplement

- Designers: James L. Cambias
- Publishers: Steve Jackson Games
- Publication: 2003; 23 years ago
- Genres: Science fiction
- Systems: GURPS

Planet of Adventure is a science fiction setting sourcebook for the GURPS role-playing game system, adapted by James L. Cambias from the fiction of Jack Vance.

== Contents ==
GURPS Planet of Adventure describes a distant world populated by many varied alien and half-alien races, set in the world of the Planet of Adventure series of novels by Jack Vance.

== Publication history ==
The book was designed by James L. Cambias, and published by Steve Jackson Games in 2003.
