= Sorcerer's Son =

1979 novel by Phyllis Eisenstein

Sorcerer's Son (novel)
- First edition cover, March 1979
- Author: Phyllis Eisenstein
- Language: English
- Series: Book of Elementals
- Genre: Fantasy novel
- Publisher: Del Rey Books
- Publication date: March 1979
- Publication place: United States
- Media type: Print (Paperback)
- Pages: 380 (paperback)
- ISBN: 0-451-15683-8 (paperback)
- OCLC: 19413682
- Followed by: The Crystal Palace

Sorcerer's Son is the first novel in "The Book of Elementals" series by Phyllis Eisenstein, first published as a mass-market paperback in 1979 by Del Rey Books..

The novel has been reprinted several times since, the last in 2002 in both hardcover and trade paperback, as part of a two-novel omnibus edition from Meisha Merlin Publishing, which includes the second novel, The Crystal Palace. (The final novel in the trilogy, The City in Stone, was completed by Eisenstein; when Meisha Merlin suddenly ceased operations in 2007, it was left orphaned and remains unpublished.)

== Plot ==
Spurned by a rejected offer of marriage, the demon sorcerer Smada Rezhyk begins imagining that the sorceress Lady Delivev Ormoru of Castle Spinweb is plotting to bring him down. He sends his most faithful demon servant, Gildrum, to take the form of a handsome knight, who has been injured in battle and comes to Castle Spinweb for refuge with the plan to impregnate Delivev with a child. For this purpose, Rezhyk gives the demon his seed; once Delivev is with child, Rezhyk imagines that he has eleven days to prepare his defenses until Delivev discovers the weakening of her powers and aborts the child. What he does not imagine is that the sorceress will not abort her son, or that his faithful demon servant will fall in love with his mortal enemy. Once the son, Cray Ormoru, reaches maturity, he starts on a journey as a knight to discover what became of his mysterious father.

Cray gains a few clues to the real identity of his father; he eventually realizes that he will be unable to complete his quest as a knight. Consequently, he decides to take up an apprenticeship as a sorcerer instead, following in his mother's footsteps. Rezhyk volunteers to play the role of master to Cray, but secretly seeks to sabotage his magical education. Cray is discouraged, although this turns to anger when Gildrum reveals Rezhyk's falsehood. Gildrum secretly teaches Cray demon summoning. He learns that Rezhyk is his father and abandons his apprenticeship; Rezhyk tires of his duplicity and orders Cray's death.

Gildrum manages to twist his orders from Rezhyk and hides Cray in the demon realms and continues to teach him sorcery. Cray befriends several demons and realizes that he will gain easier success by using demon allies instead of demon slaves. As freed demon slaves cannot be re-enslaved, he offers to free demons permanently in return for their service. With an army of demons he returns to defeat Rezhyk, who is already seeking to destroy Delivev. With Rezhyk finally vanquished, Gildrum is able to reveal his hidden passion for Delivev.
