= Paul van Herck =

Paul van Herck (19 May 1938 in Berchem – 19 June 1989) was a Belgian writer of science fiction novels and radio plays.

Van Herck was a Dutch and French language teacher. He debuted with radio plays for the BRT but became most well known for making plays for the Dutch TROS of which his series about space reporter and NASA astronaut Matt Meldon was the most famous.

Apart from his radio plays he wrote many science fiction novels of which Sam, of de Pluterdag (translated in English as Where were you last Pluterday?) was the most notable. The novel won the first prize at the first European Science Fiction Convention in the Italian city Trieste.

== Bibliography ==
=== Novels ===
- 1965 - De circels en andere fantastische verhalen
1. De circels
2. Depannage
3. Dorpsgek
4. Feestmaal
5. Hallo
6. De kinderrevolutie
7. M. Lawson
8. Mijn vriend DX 5
9. Paranoia
10. Polsuurwerk
11. Regen
12. Theorie
- 1968 - Sam, of de Pluterdag (M=SF 14)
- 1973 - Apollo XXI
- 1976 - Caroline O Caroline

=== Stories ===
- 1965 - Het project Bonaparte
- 1967 - Hula's koteletten
- 1967 - Vuilnis
- 1968 - De spiegel
- 1968 - Sam en de uitgever
- 1968 - Schaapjes
- 1968 - Twee voor twaalf
- 1969 - De wind
- 1969 - Finish
- 1970 - Iets over vuiligheid
- 1970 - Kwota rood vier
- 1971 - Het Leland experiment
- 1971 - Instantvisie
- 1971 - Primeur
- 1972 - Cijfer, cijfer, cijfer, cijfer
- 1973 - Carol
- 1973 - De laatste
- 1973 - Mont Noir
- 1974 - Katalysator
- 1974 - Twark
- 1975 - 20 miljard dollar... naar de maan
- 1975 - Dreyfus
- 1975 - Het mannetje
- 1975 - Notker van Luik
- 1975 - Parallel
- 1977 - Tequila
- 1978 - Een wilde rukwind
- 1978 - Ouwe
- 1978 - Tweede leven
- 1979 - Amerika
- 1979 - Sol 3
- 1984 - Phil, of het VIde continent
- 1986 - De spin met de tien poten
- 1987 - De tijdmachine
- 1988 - Lampen

=== Radio plays ===
- Matt Meldon-cycle
1. 1970 - Apollo XXI - Het maanmysterie
2. 1970 - De gesluierde planeet
3. 1971 - Tunnel der duisternis
4. 1973 - Prometheus XIII
5. 1976 - De blauwe zaden
- 1980 - Het zesde continent
- 1970 - Het fatale uur van Mister Lawson
- 1974 - De tijdmachine
- 19?? - De gemeenschappelijke factor
- 1969 - Een kwestie van vingerafdrukken

=== Comic books (scenario) ===
- Historical stories
1. 1974 - Het vaandel met het rode kruis
2. 1976 - Spartacus
3. 1984 - De slag bij Verdun
4. 1985 - Het pistool van Syd
5. 1985 - Het laatste oorlogspad
6. 1986 - De doden van Borgerhout
7. 1986 - Pasteur : kwakzalver of geleerde ?
