= The Crystal Palace (novel) =

1988 novel by Phyllis Eisenstein

- First edition cover, November 1988
- Author: Phyllis Eisenstein
- Language: English
- Series: Book of Elementals
- Genre: Fantasy
- Publisher: Signet Books
- Publication date: November 1988
- Publication place: United States
- Media type: Print (paperback)
- Pages: 382 (paperback edition)
- ISBN: 0-451-15678-1 (paperback); ISBN 1-892065-95-9 (omnibus)
- OCLC: 18852217
- Preceded by: Sorcerer's Son
- Followed by: The City in Stone

The Crystal Palace is the second novel in The Book of Elementals series by Phyllis Eisenstein. The first novel, Sorcerer's Son, was originally published as a mass market paperback by Del Rey Books in 1979. The Crystal Palace was originally released in 1988 as a mass-market paperback from Signet. It was last in print in both hardcover and trade paperback in the 2002 omnibus volume The Book of Elementals (with Sorcerer's Son), published by Meisha Merlin Publishing. Eisenstein completed the manuscript for the final volume in the trilogy, The City in Stone, but the novel remained unpublished after Meisha Merlin suddenly ceased operations in 2007.)

== Plot summary ==
Sorcerer Cray Ormoru and his friend, the seer Feldar Sepwin, craft an enchanted mirror that allows whoever gazes upon it to see their heart's desire. For Cray himself, the mirror remains blank for many years, until one day he sees in it the image of a young girl. With no idea of who she is, he watches the girl transform into a lovely woman over the years, and Cray realizes that he is destined to find her. When he does, he learns that this is Aliza, a sorceress who lives in a crystal palace which is partly within the demon realm and who is dedicated solely to the study of her craft.

Cray finds Aliza to be a skilled young sorceress, but also cold, aloof, and entirely focused on sorcery. Cray encourages her to take an interest in the outside world and forms a budding friendship. However, this friendship is strongly discouraged by Aliza's sorcerer grandfather, Everand. Despite Everand's disapproval, Aliza and Cray travel to the demon realm and also to the home of Cray's sorceress mother, Delivev. During this latter journey, Aliza looks into the mirror of heart's desire and causes it to shatter. This causes some initial confusion, but it is quickly revealed this is because Aliza's soul has been stolen from her.

Ultimately, her grandfather Everand is shown to be a villain of the worst degree. He uses Aliza's soul and his capture of Feldar as leverage to demand Aliza and Cray's obedience. However, Cray rallies his allies from the demon realm in order to confront and defeat Everand and free Aliza's soul. With her soul freed, Cray and Aliza realize their love for each other.
