= Johannes Marius Meulenhoff =

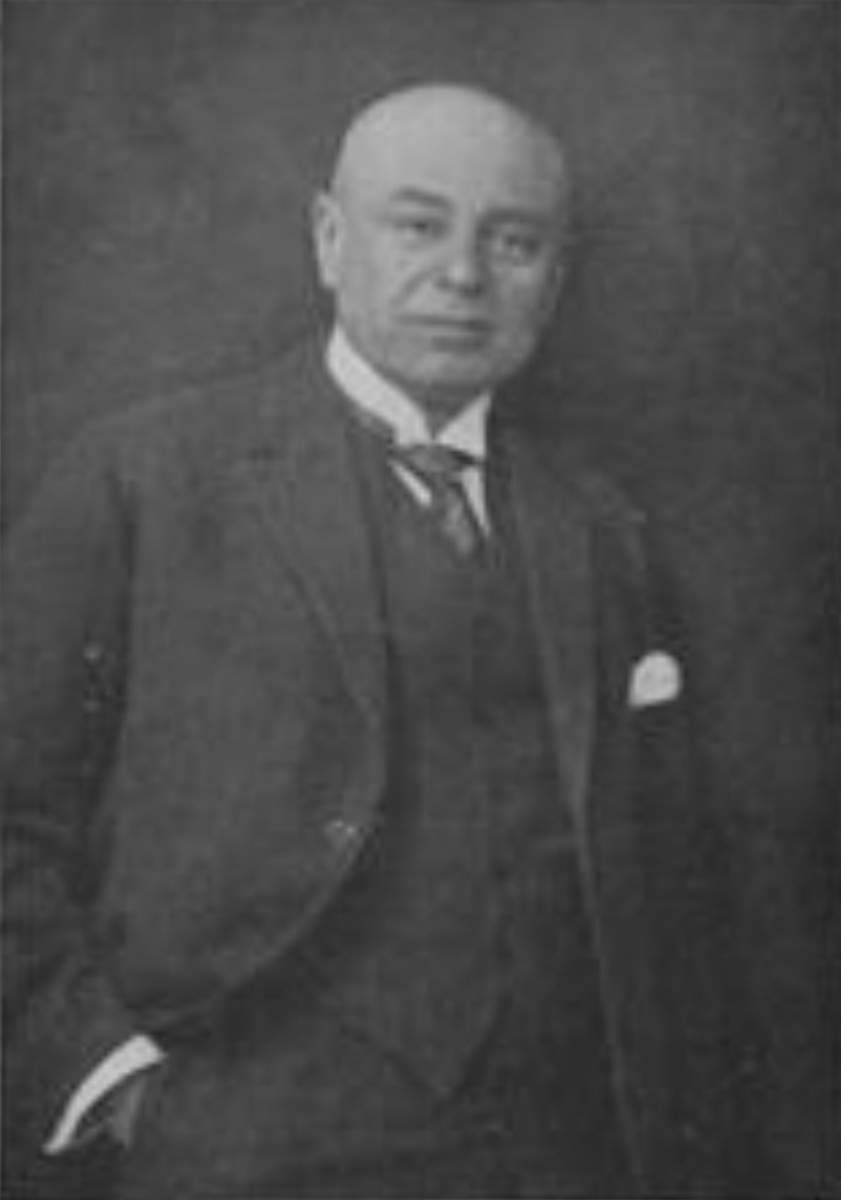
J.M. Meulenhoff

Johannes Marius Meulenhoff was born in 1869 in Zwolle, the second child in a well-to-do family. His father was an apothecary; on his mother's side were two family members who ran bookstores, and one connected to W. P. van Stockum, a book trader in The Hague. Meulenhoff attended the Hogere Burgerschool and then did an internship with a bookseller in Zwolle. In 1895 he founded publishing house J.M. Meulenhoff.
