= Lewis Turco =

American poet (1934–2024)

Lewis Putnam Turco
- Born: May 2, 1934; Buffalo, New York, U.S.
- Died: September 25, 2024 (aged 90); Belfast, Maine, U.S.
- Occupation: Poet

Academic background
- Education: University of Connecticut; Iowa Writers' Workshop

Lewis Putnam Turco (May 2, 1934 – September 25, 2024) was an American poet, teacher, and writer of fiction and non-fiction. Turco was an advocate for Formalist poetry (or New Formalism) in the United States.

== Life and work ==
Turco took a keen interest in poetry as a teenager and after high school, while serving in the U.S. Navy aboard USS Hornet (CV-12), he had work published in various little magazines and quarterlies. He graduated from the University of Connecticut in 1959, published his First Poems in 1960, and completed an MA at the University of Iowa in 1962 (at the Iowa Writers' Workshop). It was there that he cultivated an interest in formal verse and began, to use his words, "collecting forms." Turco collected these forms in the Book of Forms, published in the 1960s, a time when it would seem odd to do so since most poets were writing free verse.

Turco taught at Fenn College in Cleveland (now Cleveland State University) where he founded the Cleveland Poetry Center and at the State University of New York at Oswego where he was founding Director of the Program in Writing Arts.

In 1986 Lewis Turco won the Melville Cane Award of the Poetry Society of America for his book of criticism Visions and Revisions of American Poetry and in 1992 he received a Distinguished Alumnus Award from the Alumni Association of the University of Connecticut. He was inducted into the Meriden, Connecticut, Hall of Fame in 1993, and in 1999 he received the John Ciardi Award for lifetime achievement in poetry sponsored by the National Italian American Foundation. In May 2000 he received an honorary degree, Doctor of Humane Letters, from Ashland University in Ohio and a second from the University of Maine at Fort Kent in 2009. His book Satan's Scourge: A Narrative of the Age of Witchcraft in England and New England 1580-1697 won the Wild Card category of the New England Book Festival in the same year.

Since 2012 he was in the Honour Committee of Immagine & Poesia, the artistic literary movement founded in Turin, Italy, with the patronage of Aeronwy Thomas (Dylan Thomas's daughter).

Turco also published work under the pseudonym Wesli Court, which is an anagram of his name.

Turco lived in Dresden Mills, Maine. He died following a long illness in Belfast, Maine, on September 25, 2024, at the age of 90.

== Later work ==
Recent books are Satan's Scourge, a Narrative of the Age of Witchcraft in England and New England 1580–1697; La Famiglia / the Family, Memoirs, and a free on-line e-chapbook of poems titled Attic, Shed, and Barn, all published in 2009. In the same year he started a new venture to collect more forms at a blog called The Book of Odd and Invented Forms.

== Awards and honors ==
- First Poems was a selection of The Book Club for Poetry In 1960.
- The Compleat Melancholick, supported by a National Endowment for the Arts grant, was published in 1985, received a Chicago Book Clinic Exhibit Certificate of Award in 1986, and was selected for inclusion in the National Endowment for the Arts' New American Writing Exhibits at the International Book Fairs of Frankfurt and Liber.
- Chapbook prizes include The Sketches, a 1962 American Weave Award volume; A Family Album, the Silverfish Review Chapbook Award for 1990, and Murmurs in the Walls, winner of the Cooper House Chapbook Competition in 1992.
- In 1998 A Book of Fears: Poems won the first Bordighera Press Bi-Lingual Poetry Prize.
- A second edition of The Book of Forms: A Handbook of Poetics, originally published in 1968 and known to The New Formalists as “The poet’s Bible,” was published as The New Book of Forms in 1986, and a Third Edition appeared in 2000.
- A companion to The Book of Forms, The Book of Literary Terms, was a 1999 Choice “Outstanding Academic Book” in 2000; and a third, the 2004 The Book of Dialogue, was chosen in 2005 as a “University Press Book Selected for Public and Secondary School Libraries.”
- In 1986 Turco's book of criticism, Visions and Revisions of American Poetry, won the Poetry Society of America's Melville Cane Award.
- Satan's Scourge won the Wild Card category in the 2009 New England Book Festival.

== Bibliography ==
- First Poems, Francestown: Golden Quill Press, 1960. (A selection of the Book Club for Poetry, 1960.)
- The Sketches of Lewis Turco and Livevil: A Mask, Cleveland: American Weave Press, 1962. (American Weave Chapbook Award, 1962.)
- Awaken, Bells Falling: Poems 1959-1967, Columbia: University of Missouri Press, 1968.
- The Book of Forms: A Handbook of Poetics, New York: E. P. Dutton, 1968.
- The Literature of New York: A Selective Bibliography of Colonial and Native New York State Authors (monograph), Oneonta: New York State English Council, 1970.
- Creative Writing in Poetry (study guide), Albany: State University of New York, 1970.
- The Inhabitant, poems, with prints by Thom. Seawell, Northampton: Despa Press, 1970.
- Pocoangelini: A Fantography & Other Poems, Northampton: Despa Press, 1971.
- Poetry: An Introduction Through Writing (college text), Reston: Reston Publishing Co., 1973.
- The Weed Garden (chapbook), Orangeburg: Peaceweed Press, 1973.
- Freshman Composition and Literature (study guide), Albany: State University of New York, 1974.
- Courses in Lambents: Poems, (by "Wesli Court," pseud.), Oswego: Mathom Publishing Company, 1977.
- Curses and Laments (by "Wesli Court," pseud.), Stevens Point: Song Magazine, 1978.
- Murgatroyd and Mabel (by "Wesli Court," pseud.), with color illustrations by "Robert Michaels" (Robert Sullins), Oswego: Mathom Publishing Company, 1978.
- A Cage of Creatures (chapbook), Potsdam: Banjo Press, 1978.
- Seasons of the Blood (chapbook), Rochester: Mammoth Press, 1980.
- The Airs of Wales (chapbook, "Wesli Court," pseud.), Philadelphia: Poetry Newsletter of Temple University, 1981.
- American Still Lives, Oswego: Mathom Publishing Company, 1981.
- The Compleat Melancholick, Minneapolis: The Bieler Press / University of California Press, 1985. (Chicago Book Clinic Exhibit Certificate of Award, 1986.) (Selection for inclusion in the National Endowment for the Arts' New American Writing Exhibits, International Book Fairs of Frankfurt and Liber,1986.)
- Visions and Revisions of American Poetry (criticism), Fayetteville: University of Arkansas Press, 1986.
- A Maze of Monsters, Poems (chapbook), Livingston: Livingston University Press, 1986.
- The New Book of Forms, Hanover: University Press of New England, 1986.
- The Fog: Chamber Opera in One Act (score), music by Walter Hekster, libretto by Lewis Turco, Amsterdam: Donemus, 1987.
- The Shifting Web: New and Selected Poems, Fayetteville: University of Arkansas Press, 1989.
- Dialogue: A Socratic Dialogue on the Art of Writing Dialogue in Fiction, Cincinnati: Writer's Digest Books, 1989.
  - British edition, London: Robinson Publishing, 1991.
  - Italian edition, Il Dialogo, tr. Silvia Biasi, Milano: Casa Editrice Nord, 1992.
- A Family Album (chapbook), Eugene: Silverfish Review, 1990. (Silverfish Review Chapbook Award, 1989.)
- The Public Poet, Five Lectures on the Art and Craft of Poetry, Ashland: Ashland University Poetry Press, 1991.
- Murmurs in the Walls (chapbook), Oklahoma City: Cooper House, 1992. (Cooper House Chapbook Award, 1990.)
- Emily Dickinson, Woman of Letters, Albany: State University of New York Press, 1993.
- Legends of the Mists (chapbook), Kew Gardens: New Spirit Press, 1993.
- How to Write a Mi££ion (with Ansen Dibell and Orson Scott Card) London: Robinson Publishing, 1995.
- Bordello (portfolio), poems, with prints by George O'Connell, Oswego: Grey Heron / Mathom, 1996.
- Shaking the Family Tree A Remembrance (monograph), West Lafayette: VIA Folios / Bordighera, 1998.
- A Book of Fears, Poems, with Italian Translations by Joseph Alessia, West Lafayette: Bordighera, 1998. (First Annual Bordighera Bi-Lingual Poetry Award of the Sonia Raiziss-Giop Foundation.)
- The Life and Poetry of Manoah Bodman, Bard of the Berkshires, Lanham: University Press of America, 1999.
- The Book of Literary Terms: The Genres of Fiction, Drama, Nonfiction, Literary Criticism and Scholarship, Hanover: University Press of New England, 1999. (Choice Outstanding Academic Title, 2000.)
- The Book of Forms: A Handbook of Poetics, Third edition, University Press of New England, 2000.
- The Green Maces of Autumn: Voices in an Old Maine House, Dresden: Mathom Bookshop, 2002.
- The Book of Dialogue, How to Write Effective Conversation in Fiction, Screenplays, Drama, and Poetry, Hanover: University Press of New England, 2004.
- A Sheaf of Leaves: Literary Memoirs, Scottsdale: Star Cloud Press, 2004.
- The Collected Lyrics of Wesli Court, 1953–2004, Scottsdale: Star Cloud Press, 2004.
- Fantaseers: a Book of Memories, Scottsdale: Star Cloud Press 2005
- Fearful Pleasures: The Complete Poems, 1959–2007, Scottsdale: Star Cloud Press, 2007.
- The Museum of Ordinary People and Other Stories, Scottsdale: Star Cloud Press, 2008.
- Satan's Scourge, A Narrative of the Age of Witchcraft, Scottsdale: Star Cloud Press, 2009.
- La Famiglia / The Family, Memoirs, Scottsdale: Star Cloud Press, 2009.
- Attic, Shed, and Barn, a free, on-line chapbook, Ahadada books, 2009.
- The Gathering of the Elders and Other Poems by “Wesli Court,” a.k.a. Lewis Turco, Scottsdale, AZ, 2010.
- The Book of Forms: A Handbook of Poetics, Including Odd and Invented Forms, Revised and Expanded Edition, Hanover, NH: University Press of New England, 2012.
- Dialects of the Tribe: Postmodern American Poets and Poetry, Nacogdoches, TX: Stephen F. Austin State University Press, 2012.
- Satan’s Scourge: A Narrative of the Age of Witchcraft in England and America 1580-1697, e-book edition, Scottsdale, AZ: Kindle edition, 2012, 808 pp. Winner of the Wild Card category of the 2009 New England Book Festival.
- Wesli Court’s Epitaphs for the Poets, Baltimore, MD: BrickHouse Books, 2012, paperback, ISBN 978-1-938144-01-1.
- The Familiar Stranger, Scottsdale, AZ: Start Cloud Press, 2014.
- The Hero Enkidu: an Epic, New York, NY, Bordighera Press, 2015.
- The Book of Forms: A Handbook of Poetics, Fifth edition, Albuquerque: University of New Mexico Press, 2020.
- The Book of Dialogue: How to Write Effective Conversation in Fiction, Screenplays, Drama, and Poetry, Albuquerque: University of New Mexico Press, 2020.
- The Book of Literary Terms: The Genres of Fiction, Drama, Nonfiction, Literary Criticism and Scholarship, Second Edition, Albuquerque: University of New Mexico Press, 2020.

== Notes ==
1. Turco, L. A Sheaf of Leaves: Literary Memoirs, Star Cloud Press, 2005. ISBN 0-9651835-6-4
2. Turco, L. A Sheaf of Leaves: Literary Memoirs, Star Cloud Press, 2005. ISBN 0-9651835-6-4
