= Big Planet =

1957 novel by Jack Vance

- First edition (abridged) of Big Planet
- Author: Jack Vance
- Language: English
- Genre: Science fiction
- Publisher: Avalon Books
- Publication date: 1957
- Publication place: United States
- Media type: Print (Hardback)
- Followed by: Showboat World

Big Planet is a science fiction novel by American writer Jack Vance. It is the first novel (the other being Showboat World) sharing the same setting, an immense, but metal-poor and backward world called Big Planet.

Big Planet was first published in Startling Stories (vol. 27 no. 2, September 1952), then cut and reissued in 1957 by Avalon Books. It was later issued as part of Ace double novel D-295, paired with Vance's Slaves of the Klau. It was further cut in 1958. The text was restored in 1978.

== Plot summary ==
Restored text edition, Ace Books, 1978

Big Planet had been colonized hundreds of years prior to the start of the novel by misfits, faddists, cultists and anti-government advocates from Earth. The environment is Earth-like, including the surface gravity; even though the planet is much larger than Earth (hence the name), it is much less dense, resulting from a scarcity of metal. As a result, a large number of technologically backward societies have developed, many of them ruled by petty tyrants and prey to lawlessness, murder, and mayhem.

Commissions from Earth have visited Big Planet at irregular intervals for 500 years to little effect; the majority of them are never heard from again. The latest, headed by Claude Glystra, arrives to try to stop the illegal importation of arms from Earth and halt Big Planet's slave trade, especially targeting Charley Lysidder, the ruthless, expansion-minded Bajarnum of Beaujolais. However, their starship is sabotaged by Lysidder's agents and crashes near a quaint village called Jubilith, near Beaujolais.

The survivors attempt to reach Earth Enclave, 40,000 miles away, armed with little more than their wits and a few modern hand weapons. A Jubilith resident, Natilien-Thilssa, whom they call "Nancy," insists on tagging along, despite Glystra's opposition. The team begins to dwindle as Lysidder's efforts and the dangers of Big Planet take their toll. Nevertheless, by sheer tenacity, resourcefulness, and some luck, Glystra manages to triumph over Lysidder, despite the presence of Lysidder's agents within his own small group.

Among the many societies, benign or bizarre, that Glystra and his companions encounter along the wind-driven monoline (their version of the yellow brick road), is the quasi-utopian society of Kirstendale. At first, it appears to be based on snobbish principles, but an odd twist reveals it to be surprisingly egalitarian.

== Reviews ==
According to science fiction scholar Nick Gevers, Big Planet "was instrumental in the development of the planetary romance form ... perhaps the first attempt at a convincingly complete imaginary world in genre s-f....[T]he conviction persists that it is not the characters who serve as the book's protagonists, but rather Big Planet itself.

John Grant gave a negative review, writing:

In sum, there's a strong sense of coitus interruptus ... it's as if one had paid for the Magical Mystery Tour and all that happened was that the bus went round the block and dumped you back on your own doorstep. ... Big Planet is one of those books that anyone seriously interested in the evolution of fantasy/sf should ... well, not so much read as have, at some stage, read. It is significant to the history of the genre even if no longer, as a novel, especially significant in itself.
