= Born to Exile =

1978 novel by Phyllis Eisenstein

- Dust-jacket illustration by Stephen E. Fabian for Born to Exile
- Author: Phyllis Eisenstein
- Illustrator: Stephen E. Fabian
- Cover artist: Stephen E. Fabian
- Language: English
- Genre: Science fiction, Fantasy novel
- Publisher: Arkham House
- Publication date: 1978
- Publication place: United States
- Media type: Print (hardback)
- Pages: 202
- ISBN: 0-87054-082-3
- OCLC: 4166651
- LC Class: PZ7.E3468 Bo

Born to Exile is a fantasy novel by American writer Phyllis Eisenstein, the first of her three Alaric novels. It was originally published in 1978 by longtime U. S. specialty press Arkham House in a first edition trade hardcover of 4,148 copies; it has since been published in several mass-market paperback editions and again in hardcover in the UK. Portions of the novel were first serialized as individual shorter works through The Magazine of Fantasy & Science Fiction. (The second novel in the series, In The Red Lord's Reach, was first published in 1989 as a mass-market paperback from Signet Books and as a 1992 UK hardcover from Grafton, having been first serialized in 1988 as three monthly installments in The Magazine of Fantasy and Science Fiction.)

Sheldon Jaffery states that this volume was the last Arkham House book to bear a colophon with the edition size stated, except for Clark Ashton Smith's The Black Book and Richard L. Tierney's Collected Poems.

== Plot summary ==
Born to Exile concerns the adventures of a wandering minstrel called Alaric, who was born with preternatural powers and possesses the otherwise unknown ability to teleport. The novel details his journey to uncover the secrets of his own past and the true nature of his mysterious ability.

On this journey, he encounters the craggy towers and shining spires of a distant castle, like some gleaming vision in one of his songs. Within, Alaric is accepted as court minstrel but becomes embroiled in palace intrigue that involves Medron, the court magician, and the King's daughter, Princess Solinde. Subsequently, he journeys to the sinister Inn of the Black Swan and then to a superstition-ensorcelled village. There, Alaric is restored to his supernatural antecedents, known as the Lords of All Power.

== Sources ==
- Jaffery, Sheldon (1989). The Arkham House Companion. Mercer Island, WA: Starmont House, Inc. pp. 120–121. ISBN 1-55742-005-X.
- Chalker, Jack L.; Mark Owings (1998). The Science-Fantasy Publishers: A Bibliographic History, 1923-1998. Westminster, MD and Baltimore: Mirage Press, Ltd. pp. 52–53.
- Joshi, S.T. (1999). Sixty Years of Arkham House: A History and Bibliography. Sauk City, WI: Arkham House. p. 144. ISBN 0-87054-176-5.
- Nielsen, Leon (2004). Arkham House Books: A Collector's Guide. Jefferson, NC and London: McFarland & Company, Inc. p. 118. ISBN 0-7864-1785-4.
