= Phyllis Eisenstein =

American author (1946–2020)

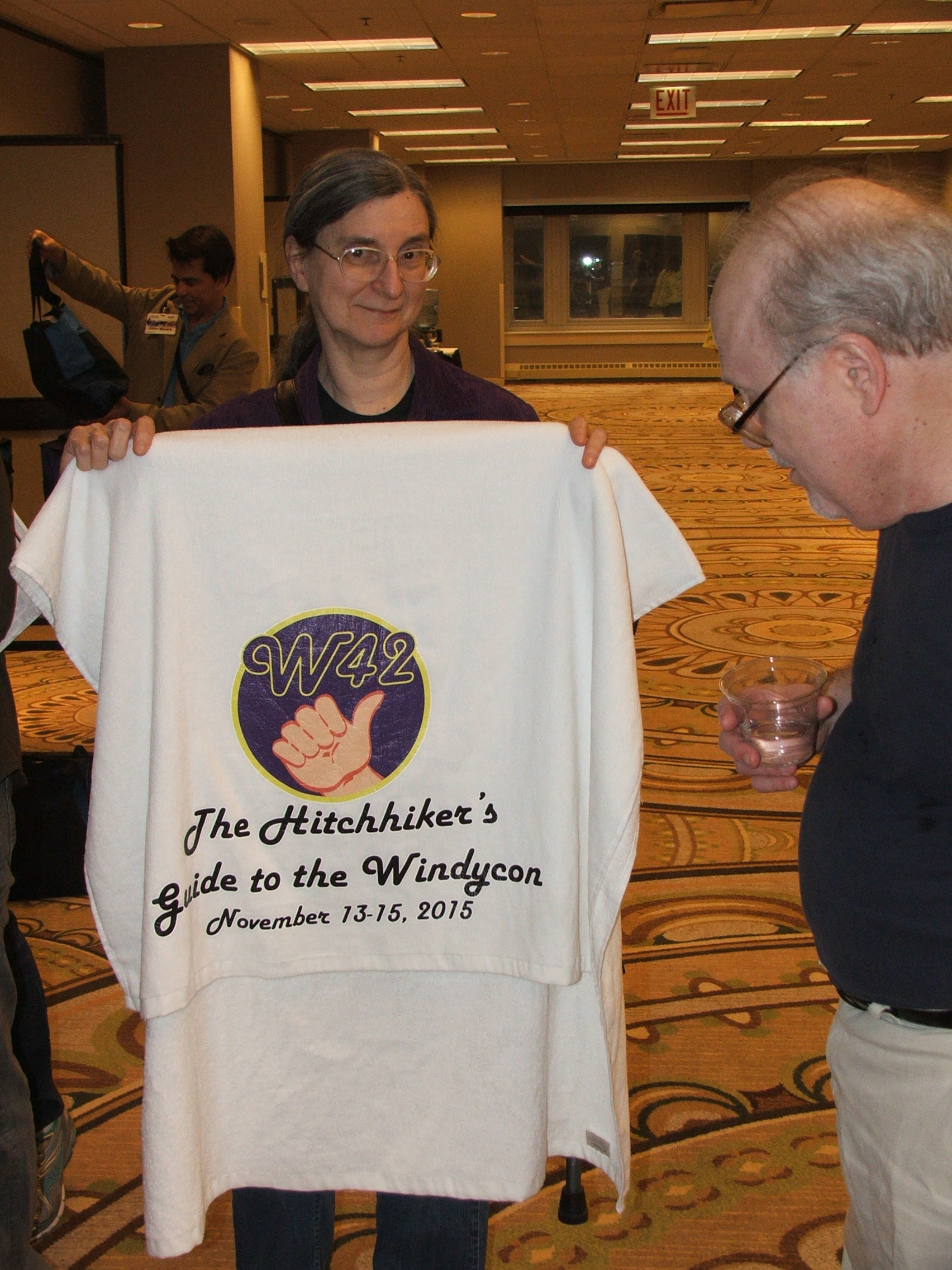
- Phyllis Eisenstein at the 2015 Nebula Conference, as husband Alex looks on
- Born: February 26, 1946; Chicago, Illinois, U.S.
- Died: December 7, 2020 (aged 74); Chicago, Illinois, U.S.
- Occupation: Author
- Writing career
- Genres: Fantasy, science fiction

Phyllis Eisenstein (February 26, 1946 – December 7, 2020) was an American author of science fiction and fantasy short stories as well as novels. Her work was nominated for both the Hugo Award and Nebula Award.

== Early life ==
Eisenstein was born Phyllis Leah Kleinstein in 1946 in Chicago, Illinois, and lived there most of her life. While studying psychology at the University of Chicago in 1963, she met her future husband Alex at a weekly gathering of Chicago's science fiction fandom. In 1966, shortly after attending Tricon, the 24th World Science Fiction Convention, they were married. She continued college until Alex entered the U. S. Air Force and, following basic training, was posted to Germany; they lived there for three years and then returned to Chicago upon his honorable discharge from the service.

== Career ==
Eisenstein had her first two science fiction stories published in 1971, the first in collaboration with husband Alex (he continued to be her writing partner for certain short stories). After establishing herself as a professional writer, she returned to college to finish her education, studying at the University of Illinois, where she earned a 1981 B.A. degree in anthropology.

She wrote eight novels, subsequently publishing six of them and nearly fifty shorter works of varying lengths in the genres of science fiction, fantasy, and horror fiction; Eisenstein also wrote a popular non-fiction book on the treatment of arthritis. Her stories have appeared in a number anthologies and in many major science fiction and fantasy print media magazines; these include The Magazine of Fantasy and Science Fiction, Analog Science Fiction and Fact, Galaxy Science Fiction, Isaac Asimov's Science Fiction Magazine, Amazing Stories, Weird Tales, and others.

Eisenstein's stories were nominated twice for science fiction's Hugo Award and three times for SFWA's Nebula Award.

Her 1978 short story "Lost and Found" was adapted for television in 1986, airing on the mid-1980s series The Twilight Zone (the first of three revivals of the classic series); the screenplay was written by the show's then story editor George R. R. Martin. She was an old friend of Martin and later convinced him to include dragons in his international best-selling fantasy series A Song of Ice and Fire. Martin then dedicated the third novel in the series, A Storm of Swords, to Eisenstein.

Eisenstein spent much of her adult life teaching writing; this began by assisting author Roger Zelazny at the Indiana University Writers Conference in 1977. She taught writing at the Clarion Science Fiction Writer's Workshop at Michigan State University, Oakton Community College of Skokie, Illinois, and the Writer's Digest School. For twenty years she was a member of the part-time faculty of Columbia College Chicago, teaching courses in general science fiction, popular fiction writing, fantasy, and advanced science fiction writing. In 1999, Eisenstein received an "Excellence in Teaching" Award from this institution; she retired from CCC in 2009 to devote more time to her professional writing career.

Beginning in 2000, Eisenstein began working full-time in Chicago's very competitive advertising business; she went on to become the executive manager of copy editors for more than a decade at Leo Burnett, Chicago's largest advertising agency, until declining health forced her retirement in 2015.

The completed novel, The City in Stone, the last volume of her "Book of Elementals" fantasy trilogy, was left unreleased when Meisha Merlin Publishing, a well-established fantasy and science fiction publisher, suddenly ceased operations in 2007; the novel remains unpublished, while the first two novels in the series are currently out-of-print.

Eisenstein completed The Walker Between Worlds, the first novel in a new science-fantasy series called "The Masks of Power". The first eight chapters from the in-progress novel, comprising 38,000 words, was published in 2007 as a limited edition trade paperback from KaCSFFS Press, a Kansas City, Missouri science fiction and fantasy independent publisher; this debuted for her Writer Guest of Honor appearance at Kansas City's longtime regional science fiction and fantasy convention ConQuesT 38. After completing The Walker Between Worlds, she purposely left the novel unpublished while she worked to complete the two remaining volumes in the series before publication. At the time of her death, "The Masks of Power" trilogy remained unfinished.

== Death ==
Eisenstein suffered a stroke in January 2020, and entered hospice care shortly thereafter. She died in December of that year in Chicago at age 74 after a protracted neurological illness, complicated by COVID-19 during the COVID-19 pandemic in Illinois. She was survived by her husband, Alex.

== Published works ==
=== Book series ===
- Tales of Alaric the Minstrel
  1. Born to Exile (1977)
  2. In the Red Lord's Reach (1989)
- The Book of Elementals
  1. Sorcerer's Son (1979)
  2. The Crystal Palace (1988)
    The Book of Elementals (omnibus) (2002)
  3. The City in Stone (completed but unpublished)
- The Masks of Power
  1. The Walker Between Worlds (completed but unpublished)

=== Stand-alone novels ===
- Shadow of Earth (1979)
- In the Hands of Glory (1981)

=== Chapterbooks ===
- Walker Between the Worlds, novella (2007)
- Conspicuous SF (2009)

=== Collections ===
- Night Lives: Nine Stories of the Dark Fantastic (2003), with Alex Eisenstein

=== Anthologies edited ===
- Spec-Lit 1: Speculative Fiction (1997)
- Spec-Lit 2: Speculative Fiction (1998)

=== Edited with Alex Eisenstein ===
- The Stars My Destination, by Alfred Bester, Special Restored Edition (1996)

=== Nonfiction ===
- Overcoming the Pain of Inflammatory Arthritis, with Samuel M. Scheiner, Ph.D. (1997)

=== Works featuring Eisenstein's stories ===
- New Dimensions 1 (1971)
- The Best from Fantasy and Science Fiction (1973)
- Long Night of Waiting (1974)
- Best SF Stories of the Year (1976)
- Best Science Fiction Stories of the Year #5 (1977)
- New Dimensions 7 (1977)
- The Year's Best Fantasy Stories 4 (1978)
- Asimov's Choice (1979)
- Best Science Fiction Stories of the Year, 1978 (1979)
- Best Science Fiction Stories of the Year #8 (1980)
- Whispers III (1981)
- Shadows 5 (1982)
- 13 Short Science Fiction Novels (1986)
- What Did Miss Darrington See (1989)
- Microcosmic Tales (1990)
- New Stories from the Twilight Zone (1990)
- New Eves: Science Fiction About the Extraordinary Women of Today and Tomorrow (1994)
- 100 Hair-Raising Little Horror Stories (1994)
- The Oxford Book of Fantasy (1994)
- Sisters In Fantasy (1995)
- Horrors! 365 Scary Stories (1998)
- Songs of the Dying Earth (2009)
- Gateways (2010)
- Old Mars (2013)
- Rogues (2014)

=== Published short stories ===
- "Born to Exile" (1971)
- "The Trouble with the Past" (1971), with Alex Eisenstein
- "Inn of the Black Swan" (1972)
- "Attachment" (1974), Nebula Award (nominee)
- "Teleprobe" (1974)
- "The Weather on Mars" (1974), with Alex Eisenstein
- "The Witch and the Well" (1974)
- "The Lords of All Power" (1975)
- "The Tree of Life" (1975)
- "Sleeping Beauty: The True Story" (1976), with Alex Eisenstein
- "Alter Ego" (1977), with Alex Eisenstein
- "You Are Here" (1977), with Alex Eisenstein
- "The Land of Sorrow" (1977)
- "In Answer To Your Call" (1978)
- "Lost and Found" (1978)
- "The Man With the Eye" (1978)
- "The Mountain Fastness" (1979)
- "The Fireman's Daughter" (1981)
- "In the Western Tradition" (1981), Nebula Award (nominee), Hugo Award (nominee)
- "Point of Departure" (1981)
- "Taboo" (1981)
- "Dark Wings" (1982)
- "Nightlife" (1982), Hugo Award (nominee)
- "Subworld" (1983)
- "The Amethyst Phial" (1984)
- "The Demon Queen" (1984)
- "Fair Exchange" (1985)
- "Sense of Duty" (1985)
- The Snail Out of Space" (1985)
- "Weaseling Out" (1987)
- "No Refunds" (1994)
- "Boxes" (1998)
- "The Cat" (1998)
- "Dust in the Attic" (1998)
- "The Island in the Lake" (1998), Nebula Award (nominee)
- "The Park" (1998)
- "The Robe" (1998)
- "Wild Animals" (1998)
- "Wallpaper World" (2001), with Alex Eisenstein
- "Boltzmann Schiaparelli and the Lizard King" (2009)
- "The Last Golden Thread" (2009)
- "Von Neumann's Bug" (2010), with Alex Eisenstein
- "The Sunstone" (2013)
- "The Caravan to Nowhere" (2014)
- "The Desert of Vanished Dreams" (2016)
- "The City of Lost Desire" (2019)

== Awards and nominations ==
- Nebula: Best Short Story, (nominee, 1976) for "Attachment"
- Balrog Award: Novel, (winner, 1979) for Born To Exile
- Science Fiction Chronicle: Best Novella, (winner, 1981) for "In the Western Tradition"
- Hugo: Best Novella, (nominee, 1982) for "In the Western Tradition"
- Nebula: Best Novella, (nominee, 1982) for "In the Western Tradition"
- Hugo: Best Novelette, (nominee, 1983) for "Nightlife"
- Nebula: Best Novelette, (nominee, 2000) for "The Island in the Lake"
