= Lyonesse Trilogy =

Fantasy trilogy written by Jack Vance

The 1983 trade paperback edition of Lyonesse

The Lyonesse Trilogy is a group of three fantasy novels by Jack Vance, set in the European Dark Ages, in the mythical Elder Isles west of France and southwest of Britain, a generation or two before the birth of King Arthur. The stories contain references to Atlantis and Arthurian mythology, particularly to the mythical country of Lyonesse. They are told in several related storylines which are not always strictly chronological.

== Plot summary ==
=== Lyonesse (also known as Suldrun's Garden) ===
King Casmir of Lyonesse arranges the marriage of his daughter Suldrun to Faude Carfilhiot, Duke of Vale Evander. Princes Aillas and Trewan of Troicinet are sent on a sea voyage to visit the various kingdoms of the Elder Isles to gain experience at statecraft; Aillas is eventually pushed overboard and washes up at Lyonesse. Faude Carfilhiot, wanting to be a powerful magician but lacking the patience to learn the necessary skills, schemes with his lover Tamurello. Suldrun cares for Aillas secretly and bears a son Dhrun to him. Aillas is imprisoned and Dhrun taken by the fairies and replaced with the changeling Madouc. Suldrun suicides.

=== The Green Pearl ===
King Casmir plots to destabilize South Ulfland by sending two agents, Sir Shalles and Torqual. Torqual plans to conquer all of the Elder Isles for himself. Aillas pursues and captures Lady Tatzel, declaring she is now his slave. She resists, but ends up falling in love with him. Glyneth is kidnapped by Visbhume and taken to the alternate world Tanjecterly as part of a plot by Casmir and Tamurello.

=== Madouc ===
During an unauthorized outing into a forest, Princess Madouc is separated from her bodyguard and discovers her mother, the fairy Twisk, and learns the truth. She meets Prince Dhrun at a reception and shares her knowledge with him.

King Casmir continues to plot against Aillas by funding the exploits of the Ska renegade Torqual, which however have little effect against Aillas's precautions.

Shimrod the wizard, at Murgen's request, investigates mysterious demonic apparitions in Ys, which appear to involve Melancthe. Shimrod disguises himself as a Scythian bravo to infiltrate Torqual's band. While there, he disrupts a plot to assassinate King Aillas and kidnap Dhrun.

Madouc's guardian, King Casmir, attempts to arrange a marriage for her. When she refuses, the king punishes her by making Madouc the prize in a quest for the Holy Grail. Madouc's response is to seek the Grail herself. She and Pimfydd ("Sir Pom Pom") travel to the castle where the Grail is, kill the Ogre Throop, and retrieve the Grail. The Grail itself is an anticlimax which does nothing to improve her relationship with her parents.

Torqual and Melancthe arrive at Murgen's home. Desmei orders Torqual to free the Green Pearl so she can be whole, but the Ska instead release Tamurello. Desmei's physical form is destroyed, and Tamurello tries to free Joald with the help of Torqual simply to spite Murgen. Joald manages to partially wrench free, and his presence in the Atlantic causes a massive tsunami that wipes out Ys instantly and the majority of Vale Evander soon thereafter. Before they can cause the downfall of the entire island however, Tamurello is defeated and Torqual is beheaded. Desmei and Tamurello are sent to an alternate dimension where one of Murgen's associates annihilates them utterly in supernatural fire. The Green Pearl is revealed to be a corrupting magical force and an element of a much larger inter-dimensional war, which Murgen has been trying to keep from reaching Earth.

Casmir, emboldened by the news of the destruction of Vale Evander, wars against Dahaut. Dahaut is conquered, but this causes an attack on Casmir by Aillas. The Troice army routs Casmir's army, and Casmir enters the battle but soon flees back towards Lyonesse Town. Casmir discovers to his dismay that Lyonesse Town has been captured in his absence. Queen Sollace was exiled to Europe after the castle is captured and the Grail is lost again, to be sought later by King Arthur.

Casmir is taken prisoner and spends the rest of his life in a cell ruminating over his defeat. Aillas declares himself king of the Elder Isles, and Dhrun his heir. He brings peace to the realm. Glyneth, now his queen, gives birth to her and Aillas' daughter, Serle. Madouc and Dhrun are in love, and when Twisk is summoned to partake in the celebrations she recognizes Shimrod as Madouc's father.

== Reception ==
Lyonesse: Madouc received the World Fantasy Award for Best Novel in 1990.
