= Pursuit of the Screamer =

1978 novel by Ansen Dibell

- First edition
- Author: Ansen Dibell
- Cover artist: Gino D'Achille
- Language: English
- Series: The King of Kantmorie
- Genre: Science fiction
- Published: 1978 (DAW Books)
- Publication place: United States
- ISBN: 0-87997-386-2
- OCLC: 4068337

Pursuit of the Screamer is a science fiction novel written by the American writer Ansen Dibell, first published in 1978.

== Plot ==
Jannus is the son of Mistress Lillia, the ruler of Newstock, a village near the river in Bremner. The competing villages are protected by the Valde, female warriors who serve ten years in the villages. The few who reach the end of their service are allowed to marry one of the male Valde. The Valde are tall, beautiful, filled with quick animal instincts, sexually mature at nine and dead of old age around thirty, and gifted with empathy; the power to feel one's emotions.

While watching a duel to the death between Poli, Jannus's favorite Valde, and another Valde, Jannus discovers a Screamer. This fragile humanoid creature is hunted without pity by the Valde. He saves the Screamer who tells him that he is an immortal Tek. Each time when a Tek dies he is reborn again. The Tek wants to return to Kantmorie to end his thousand years of regenerations. The Tek, called Lur by Jannus, persuades Jannus to accompany him.

Together with a merchant family, the Innsmiths (a corruption of Ironsmith) and a number of Valde warriors Jannus follows the river downstream. Among the Valde is Poli who served her ten years. After a number of adventures the Tek, Jannus, Poli and the leader of the merchant family find themselves in the desert trying to reach the location where the Shai is, the huge intelligence guiding the star ship that brought the Teks to the world, to end the endless cycle of reincarnation.

== Series ==
- Pursuit of the Screamer, DAW Books, June 1978, ISBN 0-87997-386-2
- Circle, Crescent, Star, DAW Books, February 1981, ISBN 0-87997-603-9
- Summerfair, DAW Books, July 1982, ISBN 0-87997-759-0
- Tidestorm Limit, 1983, (published in Dutch and French translations only)
  - Stormvloedgrens, Dutch edition
  - Aux confins de l'ouragan, French edition
- The Sun of Return, 1985 (published in Dutch and French translations only)
  - Gift van de Shai, Dutch edition
  - Le soleil du grand retour, French edition
