= Showboat World =

1975 novel by Jack Vance

- first edition of the Showboat World
- Author: Jack Vance
- Cover artist: Vincent Di Fate
- Language: English
- Genre: Science fiction
- Publisher: Pyramid Books
- Publication date: 1975
- Publication place: United States
- Media type: Print (Paperback)
- ISBN: 0-515-03698-6
- OCLC: 2537750
- Preceded by: Big Planet

Showboat World (original title: The Magnificent Showboats of the Lower Vissel River, Lune XXIII, Big Planet) is a science fiction novel by American writer Jack Vance, first published in 1975. It is the second, stand-alone novel in a pair of novels (the first being Big Planet) that share the same setting, a backward, lawless, metal-poor world called Big Planet. The plot structure which involves a series of dramatic presentations, often with humorous consequences, has parallels with Vance's 1965 novel Space Opera.

== Plot summary ==
Showboat World follows the farcical adventures of Apollon Zamp, owner of the showboat Miraldra's Enchantment, and his troupe of acrobats, magicians and actors. Zamp is invited by the King of Soyvanesse to travel up the river Vissel to the distant city of Mornune, there to participate in a contest. A rich prize awaits the showboat captain who stages the most spectacular performance and succeeds in entertaining the king.

The mysterious, attractive Damsel Blanche-Aster accompanies him up the river for her own reasons. Zamp loses his ship through the machinations of his chief rival, Garth Ashgale, captain of the showboat Fironzelle's Golden Conceit. In order to take part in the competition, Zamp is forced to form an unlikely partnership with staid museum ship owner Throdorus Gassoon. Both men attempt to woo the unimpressed Damsel Blanche-Aster during the perilous journey. Along the way, the travellers encounter cultures and people with weird beliefs and unusual, often violent, customs.

At least one scene was influenced by the Royal Nonesuch acting troupe episode in Adventures of Huckleberry Finn, while Showboat World itself has strongly influenced The Wizard of Karres (2004) by Mercedes Lackey, Eric Flint and Dave Freer. In addition, there are repeated references to Shakespeare's Macbeth, which is continuously adapted and readapted to the tastes of varying audiences.

When they finally arrive at Mornune, Damsel Blanche-Aster reveals herself to be the rightful ruler, only to have her claim trumped by the unwitting Gassoon, when he appears in a decrepit costume that confers the throne on him. Gassoon marries the reluctantly acquiescent Blanche-Aster and richly rewards Zamp for his part in his elevation. Gassoon gives Zamp his boat, having no further use for it, and Zamp leaves with the boat and crew. When the costume falls apart, Gassoon flees with a bag of jewels and is able to catch up with the boat, which he reclaims. Both men are now wealthy—Zamp will build a new showboat while Gassoon will resume his role as proprietor of a museum boat.
