= Servants of the Wankh =

1969 novel by Jack Vance

- First edition
- Author: Jack Vance
- Cover artist: Jeff Jones
- Language: English
- Series: Planet of Adventure
- Genre: Science fiction
- Publisher: Ace Books
- Publication date: 1969
- Publication place: United States
- Media type: Print (Paperback)
- Pages: 158
- Preceded by: City of the Chasch
- Followed by: The Dirdir

Servants of the Wankh is a 1969 science fiction adventure novel by American writer Jack Vance, the second in the tetralogy Tschai, Planet of Adventure. It tells of the efforts of the sole survivor of a human starship destroyed by an unknown enemy to return to Earth from the distant planet Tschai.

== Plot summary ==
After his starship and crewmates are blown up, Adam Reith is marooned on a planet inhabited by four advanced, mutually hostile, alien species, the Chasch, Wankh, Dirdir, and native Pnume, as well as various groups of humans. In his quest to return home, he acquires three human companions (as detailed in City of the Chasch): Traz Onmale, a taciturn teenage barbarian chieftain, Ankhe at afram Anacho, a flamboyant fugitive Dirdirman, and Ylin-Ylan, a beautiful young Yao woman whom he rescued from a man-hating religious sect.

Ylin-Ylan persuades Reith, her lover, to take her back to Cath. With her wealthy father's backing, Reith hopes to be able to build a spaceship. As time passes, however, their relationship cools. Anacho explains that Yao society is extremely status-conscious, and the closer they get to her homeland, the more Ylin-Ylan dreads being associated with her gauche, uncouth companions. Her inner conflict is exacerbated when they meet Dordolio, a Yao cavalier, who accompanies them on the sea voyage to Cath. Her attempts to distance herself from them, with Dordolio's assistance, all fail disastrously. Finally, unable to bear the shame any longer, she takes refuge in awaile, a murderous rampage not uncommon among her people, which ends with her throwing herself into the sea.

Reith and his friends continue on to Cath and notify Ylin-Ylan's father of her demise. They are coolly received, but are eventually given 50,000 sequins (the universal currency of Tschai) as a reward.

Unimpressed with Yao engineering, Reith recruits a crew from those who had worked for the Wankh, to try to steal a Wankh spaceship. The attempt almost succeeds, but the ship is damaged and sets down on a lake due to their unfamiliarity with the controls. They are captured by human Wankhmen, who handle all communication between their Wankh masters and the rest of Tschai's inhabitants.

About to be executed out of hand, the would-be thieves are reprieved when a high Wankh leader, who had been aboard the stolen ship, decides to investigate further. Reith is able to tell it what he has surmised. The Wankhmen have been deliberately misleading the Wankh; the Dirdir have not been a threat to them for centuries, but have been made to appear so in order to safeguard the Wankhmen's comfortable status quo. Furthermore, they destroyed Reith's ship for the same reason. As a result of these revelations, the Wankhmen are expelled from the Wankh cities. Reith and his party creep away unnoticed.

== Title changes ==
The editors of the Vance Integral Edition altered the title to The Wannek and replaced Wankh with Wannek throughout the text. Vance was convinced to change the name after being informed of the meaning of the word wank in British and Commonwealth slang.

== Reception ==
Tony Watson reviewed the series for Different Worlds magazine and stated that "The potential for adventure on Tschai is rich. The Chasch, Dirdir, Pnume, Wankh and their submen are constantly scheming and sparring with one another, providing ample opportunity for intrigue and fighting."

== Reviews ==
- Review by John Boardman and Creath Thorne (1969) in Science Fiction Review, April 1969
- Review by Peter Hyde (1975) in Vector 70 Autumn 1975
- Review by Mark Adlard (1977) in Foundation, #11 and 12 March 1977
- Review by Jerry L. Parsons (1979) in Science Fiction & Fantasy Book Review, October 1979

== Sources ==
- Underwood, Tim; Chuck Miller (1980). Jack Vance. New York: Taplinger Publishing Company. p. 229. ISBN 0-8008-4295-2.
