= The Pnume =

1970 novel by Jack Vance

- First edition
- Author: Jack Vance
- Cover artist: Jeff Jones
- Language: English
- Series: Planet of Adventure
- Genre: Science fiction
- Publisher: Ace Books
- Publication date: 1970
- Publication place: United States
- Media type: Print (Paperback)
- Pages: 156
- ISBN: 0-441-66902-6
- Preceded by: The Dirdir

The Pnume is a science fiction adventure novel by American writer Jack Vance. The last book in the tetralogy of Planet of Adventure, it tells of the efforts to return to Earth by the sole survivor of a human starship destroyed while investigating a mysterious signal from the distant planet Tschai.

== Plot summary ==
After many false starts and real tribulations, Adam Reith has nearly finished building a spaceship to take him home. He and his two trusted companions had been betrayed by Aila Woudiver, the underworld kingpin who had provided the necessary men and equipment in return for an extortionate amount of money. However, Reith was able to turn the tables and take Woudiver captive (as described in The Dirdir).

Even as a prisoner though, Woudiver is a dangerous enemy. Somehow, he manages to interest the Pnume in Reith. The Pnume are the sentient native race of Tschai. Driven underground by three separate alien invasions (by the Chasch, Wankh and Dirdir), they view the other species as welcome additions to the pageantry unfolding on their world stage. In the same light, they are intrigued by the Earthman, abducting him to become a specimen in their museum.

Reith is lowered into the vast Pnume underground. He manages to free himself and hide before he can be taken by human Pnumekin, servants of the Pnume, to the Museum of Foreverness. Perplexed at finding an empty bag, they summon a Pnume Sector Warden, who consults its Master Charts, detailing all the various tunnels and hidden adits. Determining that there is one possible escape route, they leave to check it. Before it departs, the Sector Warden hides its maps in a secret compartment, but Reith is a witness. He steals them, but is unable to decipher their contents.

He kidnaps a young Pnumekin woman to interpret for him. Once Reith forces her to look at the Master Charts, she realizes her life is now forfeit if she is captured, so she cooperates. Upon questioning, Reith learns that she has no name; she simply belongs to the Zith group in the Athan area of the Pagaz zone, with a rank of 210, so he names her Zap 210.

After a journey of indeterminate length, mostly spent on a barge, they finally escape to the surface. They make their way toward the city of Sivishe, where the spaceship is being built. As their trek continues, Zap 210's colorless personality begins to change, free of the peculiar constraints of Pnumekin society and the diko she had been fed to keep her body from developing normally. Eventually, she and Reith become lovers.

When they reach the city, Reith finds Anacho waiting for him. He learns that, shortly after Reith's abduction, Woudiver had been taken to be prey for a Dirdir hunt. The ship had been seen, so Traz moved it to a location known only to Reith. However, when they prepare to leave, they find Zap 210 missing, captured by the Pnume.

Despite Anacho's protestations, Reith gives himself up to the Pnume (after making certain preparations). He bargains with them, threatening to give copies of the Master Charts to the Dirdir and the Chasch unless they release Zap 210 and free all the Pnumekin from their freakish existence. The Pnume have no choice; they agree to his terms. Reith and Zap 210 return to the surface, rejoin Anacho and Traz, and finally depart for Earth.

== Reception ==
Tony Watson reviewed the series for Different Worlds magazine and stated that "The potential for adventure on Tschai is rich. The Chasch, Dirdir, Pnume, Wankh and their submen are constantly scheming and sparring with one another, providing ample opportunity for intrigue and fighting."

== Reviews ==
- Review by Charles N. Brown [as by Charlie Brown] (1970) in Locus, #50 March 19, 1970
- Review by Ted Pauls (1970) in Science Fiction Review, November 1970
- Review by David Charles Paskow [as by David C. Paskow] (1971) in Luna Monthly, #22, March 1971
- Review by Peter Hyde (1975) in Vector 70 Autumn 1975
- Review by Mark Adlard (1977) in Foundation, #11 and 12 March 1977
- Review by Jerry L. Parsons (1979) in Science Fiction & Fantasy Book Review, October 1979
- Review by Thomas A. Easton [as by Tom Easton] (1980) in Analog Science Fiction/Science Fact, July 1980
