= Planet of Adventure =

Series of science fiction novels by Jack Vance

UK Grafton cover

Planet of Adventure is a series of four science fiction novels by Jack Vance, published between 1968 and 1970. The novels relate the adventures of the scout Adam Reith, the sole survivor of an Earth ship investigating a signal from the distant planet Tschai.

== Setting ==
Map of planet Tschai, adapted by Paul Rhoads

Tschai is a planet orbiting the star Carina 4269, 212 light-years from Earth. It is populated by various sentient alien species. The native Pnume have been subjected to invasions by three species. In addition, there are humans, captured and brought to the planet long ago by one of the spacefaring species; some of them live as slaves or servants of each of the alien races, while others have managed to create their own societies. Each of the four novels relates Reith's adventures with one of the species, and is named after that species. In order, the books are:

- City of the Chasch
- Servants of the Wankh
- The Dirdir
- The Pnume

== Tschai inhabitants ==
=== Chasch ===
The somewhat reptilian Chasch arrived a hundred thousand years prior to the tale's start, and are divided into three warring factions, the decadent Old Chasch, the creatively sadistic Blue Chasch, and the barbarian Green Chasch.

=== Dirdir ===
The birdlike, or feline, predatory Dirdir had warred with the Chasch and the Wankh in the past, but on Tschai maintain an uneasy peace due to their relative military parity. In the first book they are described as "sheep-like", but Vance appears to have changed their characterization by the third, in which they are compared to leopards. The Dirdir are described as having a very complex sexuality, with many different genders that leads to many different combinations of gender-compatibility when it comes to sex and breeding, though each breeding still seems to involve only two individuals.

=== Pnume ===
The insect-like Pnume are the original inhabitants of Tschai, with a history that goes back seven million years. They view the invaders as welcome additions to the pageantry on their world stage. They were forced underground by the coming of the more powerful species.

=== Phung ===
Related to the Pnume are the Phung, solitary sentient predators with bizarre habits. The antics of a Phung feature early on in each of the first three books.

=== Wankh (or Wannek) ===
The amphibious Wankh (or Wannek) are comparatively recent arrivals and had warred with the Dirdir in the past, but subsided into an uneasy peace due to their relative military parity.

=== Humans ===
The human client races, the Pnumekin, Chaschmen, Dirdirmen and Wankhmen resemble their alien patrons to some degree, due to selective breeding, surgery and the desire of the humans to emulate their respective masters. The religious fiction that their dead are reborn as Chasch keeps the Chaschmen obedient. The Dirdirmen view themselves as degenerate Dirdir and strive to minimize their differences. The Wankhmen, on the other hand, act as the sole interpreters of the Wankh and, as a result, are able to manipulate the alien race to their own advantage. The Pnumekin are kept docile by drugs; the Gzhindra, ostracised and exiled Pnumekin, act as agents for the Pnume. Vance's depiction of the human race after tens of thousands of years on Tschai aims to show how foreign humanity can become in alien surroundings.

== Plot ==
A human ship is sent to investigate a distress signal sent 212 years ago from the previously unknown planet. The mother ship is destroyed and nearly all of the crew killed in a surprise missile attack (in some editions the mother ship and its crew do not appear). Only two scouts survive, crash-landing on Tschai in their damaged scout-boat. After his companion is killed by human nomads early on, Adam Reith is left stranded alone on an unknown world. The four books describe the attempts of a man of singularly strong will and resource to return to Earth: in the first book to recover his damaged spacecraft, in the second to steal one, in the third to build one, and in the fourth to escape the Pnume, by whom he is kidnapped before he can depart Tschai. In the process, he overcomes the obstacles of dealing with four different alien races and various human groups, often profoundly disrupting the societies, human and alien, with which he is forced to deal. The vast teeming planet, with its clashing civilizations and wildly varying cultures, affects Reith to the point that he realizes that if he succeeds in returning to Earth, his life will seem dull and colourless in comparison.

Reith acquires two faithful companions in the course of his travels: Traz Onmale, the dour, proud boy-chieftain of a nomad tribe obsessed with emblems, and Ankhe at Afram Anacho, a renegade Dirdirman who is loquacious, fastidious and flamboyant. Anacho and Traz play lesser roles in the fourth book, which chronicles Reith's adventures in the underground world of the Pnume, and subsequently on the surface with the rescued Pnumekin woman Zap 210. Romantic interest is provided both by Zap 210 and by the aristocratic Flower of Cath, who features in the first two novels. The third novel also introduces a human villain in the fat and avaricious contractor Aila Woudiver.

Tschai, like Earth, is a world of several discrete continents. The action covers most of the planet, and the second and fourth books describe lengthy sea voyages taken by Reith and his companions. Vance described blue-water sailing as one of his favorite recreations.

== Title changes ==
The editors of the Vance Integral Edition restored the author's preferred title for the first book: The Chasch. They also altered the second to The Wannek and replaced 'Wankh' with 'Wannek' throughout the text. Vance was persuaded to change the name after learning of the meaning of the word 'wank' in British and Commonwealth slang.

== Roleplaying game ==
The Planet of Adventure setting and characters have also been translated into the form of a paper-and-pencil roleplaying game in the GURPS system. GURPS: Jack Vance's Planet of Adventure was first published in September 2003 and was written by James L. Cambias.

== Comics adaptation ==
A French comic adaptation in eight volumes of the books by Li-An (drawings) and Jean-David Morvan (story) was published by Delcourt from 1998 to 2008.

== Reception ==
Tony Watson reviewed the series for Different Worlds magazine and stated that "The potential for adventure on Tschai is rich. The Chasch, Dirdir, Pnume, Wankh and their submen are constantly scheming and sparring with one another, providing ample opportunity for intrigue and fighting."

Dave Langford reviewed Planet of Adventure for White Dwarf #74, and stated that "The narrative is a near-triumph of ironic, exotic style over routinely grotty space-operatic plot [...] The good stuff lies in Tschai's rich scents and colours, and in elaboration of style."
