= City of the Chasch =

1968 novel by Jack Vance

- First edition
- Author: Jack Vance
- Cover artist: Jeff Jones
- Language: English
- Series: Planet of Adventure
- Genre: Science fiction
- Publisher: Ace Books
- Publication date: 1968
- Publication place: United States
- Media type: Print (Paperback)
- Pages: 157
- Followed by: Servants of the Wankh

City of the Chasch is a science fiction novel by American writer Jack Vance, the first in the adventure tetralogy Planet of Adventure. It follows the attempts of a man stranded on the distant planet Tschai to return to Earth.

== Plot summary ==
A human starship intercepts a mysterious signal and tracks it back to Carina 4269, a star system 212 light years from Earth. Two elite scouts, Adam Reith and Paul Waunder, are dispatched in a small scout-boat to investigate the planet whence it came. Seconds later, a missile destroys their mothership. The two survivors nurse the severely damaged scout-boat to the planet before ejecting into a forest.

The crash site is first discovered by a band of technologically primitive humans. Reith is amazed to find men on a heretofore unknown, distant planet. One of them casually kills Waunder; Reith remains undetected. A second party approaches in a large sky-raft, sending the humans scurrying into hiding. It is crewed (as Reith later learns) by massive, alien Blue Chasch and their human Chaschmen servants. Their investigation of the wreckage is interrupted by a third group, belonging to the Dirdir. The Chasch ambush the tall, pale Dirdir and their human Dirdirmen, driving them off. The Chasch then haul the scout-boat away.

Injured and helpless, Reith cannot avoid being taken captive by Traz Onmale, the grave, mature boy-chieftain of the Kruthe, the tribe which killed Waunder. While his wounds heal, Reith incurs the wrath of the "magicians" who are actually in charge, by showing kindness and affection to a slave girl, a grave violation of tribal social norms. Before he can be castrated to make him more docile, he escapes, taking Traz with him. The youth is not unwilling to go, since he would be expected to sacrifice himself to the gods in the near future due to the misfortunes the tribe has faced.

On their trek, Reith rescues an outcast Dirdirman, Ankhe at afram Anacho, from a Phung, an extremely dangerous native. With no plans of his own, he joins them. From Anacho's explanation of Dirdirman theology, Reith deduces that the Dirdir were responsible for bringing humans to Tschai tens of thousands of years ago. His mission is now clear: he must alert Earth to the possible threat of the Dirdir.

The mismatched trio join a trade caravan. Among the other passengers is a group of priestesses, taking a beautiful female captive, Ylin-Ylan, home to participate in an important rite. Reith frees her, but on the lawless steppes, the woman is stolen by the caravan's scouts and returned to the priestesses. Reith rescues her from the seminary and learns that the mysterious signal originated from her people.

The caravan is attacked by Green Chasch just outside the run-down city of Pera, but Reith's group manages to reach safety. The town is ruled by Naga Goho and his brigands. Ylin-Ylan attracts his attention; she and Traz are taken prisoner, forcing Reith to organize a revolt to overthrow the tyrant. Naga Goho is publicly hanged.

Reith's locator indicates his scout-boat is in the nearby Blue Chasch city of Dadiche. He sneaks in and finds his ship, apparently intact, but is spotted before he can make a closer inspection. He barely escapes with his life. When he returns to Pera, he finds to his chagrin that he has been elected the new chief of the city. He begins trying to bring civilization to it by organizing a form of government and, importantly on the Steppes, an army. At first the army is a sad sight, but Reith uses his experience as a soldier to guide them into something resembling a coherent force.

A group of Blue Chasch arrives in Pera, demanding Reith's surrender. When he refuses, a battle erupts, which the newly organized humans win thanks to the element of surprise; the Chasch did not think advanced tactics possible from humans. The Blue Chasch then send their entire armed might, but Reith arranges for the Green Chasch, the mortal enemies of the Blue Chasch, to ambush and wipe them out.

With Dadiche now defenseless, Reith and the men of Pera take charge. While their training made them good fighters, it failed to instill true discipline. The army goes on a revenge-fueled rampage that, despite his best efforts, Reith is unable to control and the Blue Chasch and any Chaschmen who move to resist are slaughtered. He frees the surviving Chaschmen and gives them the city, after revealing that they had been duped. The Chaschmen had been told they were transformed at death into Chasch. Baby Chasch were implanted in their corpses in secret, to emerge before Chaschmen witnesses.

When Reith checks his scout-boat, he discovers to his dismay that it has been gutted. Ylin-Ylan convinces him to take her back to technologically advanced Cath, where he might be able to build a ship with the backing of her wealthy father.

== Reception ==
Tony Watson reviewed the series for Different Worlds magazine and stated that "The potential for adventure on Tschai is rich. The Chasch, Dirdir, Pnume, Wankh and their submen are constantly scheming and sparring with one another, providing ample opportunity for intrigue and fighting."

== Reviews ==
- Review by John Boardman and Creath Thorne (1969) in Science Fiction Review, April 1969
- Review by Peter Hyde (1975) in Vector 70 Autumn 1975
- Review by Mark Adlard (1977) in Foundation, #11 and 12 March 1977
- Review by Jerry L. Parsons (1979) in Science Fiction & Fantasy Book Review, October 1979
- Review by Lee Smith (1979) in Thrust, #13, Fall 1979
- Review by Daniel Temianka (1986) in Fantasy Review, June 1986
- Review by Don D'Ammassa (1986) in Science Fiction Chronicle, #82 July 1986

== Sources ==
- Underwood, Tim; Chuck Miller (1980). Jack Vance. New York: Taplinger Publishing Company. p. 227. ISBN 0-8008-4295-2.
