= Erik Dhont =

Belgian landscape architect

Erik Dhont (born 14 February 1962) is a Belgian landscape architect.

Dhont was born in Anderlecht, a municipality in Brussels. After receiving a diploma in graphic arts he decided to become a landscape architect. He finished landscape architecture studies in Vilvoorde in 1986 and founded his own practice in Brussels in 1989.

"Renowned for his free and sensitive interpretations of historical garden design", in his work he combines landscaping with art and the use of abstract forms is typical in his design. During his career, he designed numerous large-scale private projects in Europe but also overseas. Among other projects, in 1997 he designed a 55-acre park for fashion designer Dries Van Noten and in 2003 started working with the project of the garden of Baron and Baroness Guy Ullens de Schooten. In 2014 Dhont designed garden Musée Picasso in Paris for its re-opening.

His portfolio includes other projects as gardens, farmyards, and landscape restorations such as the one at Baljuwshuis, Gaasbeek, near Brussels, working for Baron and Baroness Piet Van Waeyenberge between 1992–5, and the restoration of the landscape around the Palm Brewery, Diepensteyn, Steenhuffel-Londerzeel. In addition to other private gardens, he also worked with public spaces, like for example in a park in Schaarbeek, Brussels. Outside Belgium he has projects in Switzerland, France, Germany, California and in the Azores.

He worked in collaboration with many architects, such as Philippe Samyn, for the Head Office of AGC Glass Europe, 360 Architecten for the New Learning Center at the Gasthuisberg Campus of KU Leuven, and interior designers like Axel Vervoordt or Gert Voorjans, at Dries Van Noten's House.

Dhont was asked to represent Belgium at L'Art du Jardin international exhibition of landscape and gardening in Paris in 2013. The Centre for Fine Arts, Brussels organized combined exhibition of drawings of Jean Canneel-Claes and plaster models from Dhont in 2014.

In 2015 he attended the international meeting of the landscape and garden I Maestri del Paesaggio in Bergamo as one of the invited speakers.

== Bibliography ==
- Dhont, Erik (2001). Gardens, Invisible Landscapes (in French and English). Ludion Editions NV.
- Dhont, Erik (2014). Erik Dhont: Gypsotheque. Architectura & Natura, Amsterdam.
- Dhont, Erik (2021). Erik Dhont Landscape Architects: Works 1999–2020 (in French and English). Hatje Cantz
