= Lannoo =

Belgian publishing group

- Lannoo logo
- Industry: Publishing
- Founded: 1909
- Headquarters: Tielt, Belgium
- Key people: Joris Lannoo (1891-1971); Godfried Lannoo (1927-2012); Matthias Lannoo
- Products: Books, audio books, databases, e-books
- Website: lannoo.com

Uitgeverij Lannoo Groep is a Belgian publishing group, based in Tielt, with assets in Belgium and the Netherlands. Its Belgian subsidiary is Uitgeverij Lannoo. Its Dutch subsidiary is LannooMeulenhoff. Over the years Lannoo evolved from Catholic and Flemish to an open, commercial publishing house.

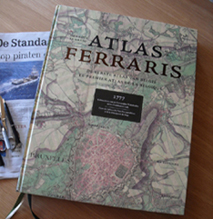
Atlas Ferraris, published 2009 by Lannoo

== Uitgeverij Lannoo ==
The publishing and printing company Lannoo was founded in 1909 by Joris Lannoo (1891–1971). Joris Lannoo was a member of the Flemish Movement. The original company logo, featuring a sailing Viking neck, was designed by Joe English and modernized over the years. After Joris Lannoo, Jan and Godfried Lannoo took over the management of the company. In 1991 the publisher company spun off Lannoo Printers (the printing company went bankrupt in 2018). The French-language Éditions Racine was founded in 1993. In 1994 Godfried Lannoo resigned as general manager to be replaced by his son Matthias Lannoo. In 1999 Lannoo acquired the Dutch publishing house Terra Zutphen and reorganized it into TerraLannoo. In 2003 the company set up its own scientific publishing house in Leuven, LannooCampus. In 2010, the company acquired the Dutch publishers Meulenhoff Boekerij and Unieboek Het Spectrum. Since then, Lannoo publishes literature again, an activity that had almost fallen silent in the second half of the 20th century. In 2015, the publishing group acquired the Belgian publisher Academia Press.

Uitgeverij Lannoo is a Belgian publishing company, based in Tielt, with three subsidiaries:

- Distrimedia – since 1994 in charge of the distribution of own imprints and other companies, also in Tielt.
- Lannoo Graphics
- Lannoo Uitgeverij

== LannooMeulenhoff ==
LannooMeulenhoff is a Dutch publishing company, based in Amsterdam. It has subsidiaries: Meulenhoff Boekerij, Unieboek Het Spectrum, and TerraLannoo.

=== Meulenhoff Boekerij ===
Meulenhoff was founded in 1895 by Johannes Marius Meulenhoff. Over the years, it built a reputation publishing literary works in original Dutch and in translation. For many decades, the company was led by Laurens van Krevelen, who received the Jan Hein Donner Award (a prestigious Dutch prize, awarded once every five years to notable persons in the publishing industry) in 2007. Meulenhoff was acquired by the books division of PCM Uitgevers, then by Lannoo.

In 2001, Meulenhoff was rocked by the departure of long-time editor Tilly Hermans, for which the Dutch and other media blamed the corporate culture of then owner PCM Uitgevers. PCM, it was said, cared more for the bottom line than for the company's authors and editors, and was blamed for a "purge" that also led to the early retirement of van Krevelen. After more than thirty years with Meulenhoff Hermans founded Augustus, a smaller publishing house. Thirty authors followed her to the new publishing house, including Rudy Kousbroek and Adriaan van Dis). Others who left were Maarten Biesheuvel and Stefan Hertmans.

Authors published by Meulenhoff include: Alicia Austin, Maarten Biesheuvel. Roberto Bolaño, Stefan Hertmans, Annemarie Kindt, Mario Vargas Llosa, Carl Lundgren, E. L. de Marigny, Jaime Martijn, Gabriel García Márquez, and Elie Wiesel M=SF was a science fiction and fantasy novels series by Meulenhoff.

Imprints of Meulenhoff Boekerij include:

- Arena
- Boekerij - novels
- Forum
- Meulenhoff - literature
- Mynx

=== Unieboek Het Spectrum ===
Het Spectrum was established in 1935 by book sellers P.H. Bogaard and A.H. Bloemsma. Its first location was a room above a bakery in de Biltstraat in Utrecht. Het Spectrum started as a progressive-Catholic publisher that aspired to supply good reading materials to the masses. Hence it published many pocket books. After World War II, this formula continued as Prisma Pockets. Among the pocket books were translated classics for the modest price of 1,25 guilder. The Prisma dictionaries were also part of this line. Gradually the publishing company became one of the largest in the Netherlands. Dutch authors that have been published through the Het Spectrum imprints include Godfried Bomans, Han van Bree, Hubrecht Duijker, L. T. F. Gamut, Ben Tiggelaar, and Janwillem van de Wetering. International authors include Dorothy Parker, Dr. Phil, Peter Singer, Edgar Wallace, and P. G. Wodehouse.

Unieboek was founded 1968 by Cornelis Anthonie Jacobus van Dishoeck (1921−1990), grandson and namesake of the publisher Cornelis Anthonie Jacobus van Dishoeck (1863−1931). The publisher included the imprints Van Holkema & Warendorf, Van Goor, Van Reemst, and Lifestyle & Wellbeing. Authors published by Unieboek and its subsidiaries include Suzanne Collins, Marion van de Coolwijk, Arend van Dam, Jaap ter Haar, Vivian den Hollander, Rik Hoogendoorn, Bouke Jagt, Jan van der Made, Tosca Menten, Mirjam Mous, Francine Oomen, Janneke Schotveld, Ben Tiggelaar (also at Het Spectrum), Jacques Vriens, Dolf de Vries, and Harm de Jonge.

In September 1999, Het Spectrum was acquired by PCM Uitgevers. PCM was acquired by De Persgroep in 2003. Lannoo acquired Het Spectrum in 2010.

In 2018 Unieboek Het Spectrum operates from Houten through the following imprints (specializations listed):

- Best of YA – novels
- Van Dishoeck – food & beverage books
- Van Holkema & Warendorf – fiction books for all ages, lifestyle
- Van Goor – children's books, juvenile books
- Mana – new age
- Prisma – langue books
- Van Reemst – travel guides in the series Capitool, Marco Polo, Nelles Gidsen and Dutch translations of Rough Guides
- Spectrum – nonfiction
- Winkler Prins – encyclopedias

=== TerraLannoo ===
Uitgeverij TerraLannoo is in charge of sales and marketing in the Netherlands of publications by the Belgian publishers Terra, Lannoo, and Lannoo Campus.

It also manages the Michelin publications in the Netherlands.
