= Roger Zelazny bibliography =

This is a partial bibliography of American science fiction and fantasy author Roger Zelazny (missing several individual short stories published in collections).

== Series ==
=== The Chronicles of Amber ===
The Chronicles of Amber comprise two series of five novels each and seven short stories.

The first five books describe the adventures of Prince Corwin of Amber:

1. 1970 Nine Princes in Amber
2. 1972 The Guns of Avalon
3. 1975 Sign of the Unicorn
4. 1976 The Hand of Oberon
5. 1978 The Courts of Chaos

The second series tells the story of Corwin's son Merlin (Merle), a wizard and computer expert. These volumes are:

1. 1985 Trumps of Doom – Locus Fantasy Award winner, 1986
2. 1986 Blood of Amber – Locus Fantasy Award nominee, 1987
3. 1987 Sign of Chaos – Locus Fantasy Award nominee, 1988
4. 1989 Knight of Shadows
5. 1991 Prince of Chaos

Zelazny also wrote seven short stories set in the Amber multiverse. Here they are listed in Zelazny's intended order, with first publication dates.

1. 2005 "A Secret of Amber" [story fragment co-written with Ed Greenwood between 1977 and 1992, published in Amberzine #12–15]
2. 1985 "Prolog to Trumps of Doom"
3. 1994 "The Salesman's Tale"
4. 1995 "Blue Horse, Dancing Mountains"
5. 1994 "The Shroudling and The Guisel"
6. 1995 "Coming to a Cord"
7. 1996 "Hall of Mirrors"

In 2020 Amber Limited released the short stories as a collection titled Seven Tales in Amber with an introduction by Warren Lapine.

The latter five of these stories form one tale set after Prince of Chaos, so they are latest in Amber history.

All ten novels have been published in a single omnibus form as The Great Book of Amber and six of the seven short stories were collected in Manna from Heaven. A sex scene deleted from The Guns of Avalon has been published in Collected Stories, volume 3, while the seven Amber short tales appear in volume 6.

Zelazny collaborated on a companion book, The Visual Guide to Castle Amber (1988), by Zelazny and Neil Randall, illustrated by Todd Cameron Hamilton and James Clouse. The Guide is a reference work providing biographical detail on the Amber characters and a walk-through guide to Castle Amber itself.

John Betancourt has written a series of novels set in the Amber multiverse set several centuries before Nine Princes in Amber. Betancourt's series tells the story of Corwin's father Oberon, a wizard and shapeshifter. That the Zelazny estate authorized the series has caused some controversy; see "The Chronicles of Amber" for more details.

An interactive fiction computer game based on Nine Princes in Amber was released by Telarium in 1985. The Amber novels also inspired a unique role-playing game, lacking any random element: Amber Diceless Roleplaying, published by Phage Press.

=== Francis Sandow ===
1. Isle of the Dead (1969) – Nebula Award nominee, 1969
2. To Die in Italbar (1973) (cameo appearance by Francis Sandow)

=== Wizard World ===
1. Changeling (1980) – Locus Fantasy Award nominee, 1981
2. Madwand (1981)

Wizard World (1989) (omnibus)

=== Dilvish ===
1. Dilvish, the Damned (1982) (a "fix-up" novel or short story collection)
2. The Changing Land (1981) – Locus Fantasy Award nominee 1982

=== The Millennial Contest Trilogy (with Robert Sheckley) ===
1. Bring Me the Head of Prince Charming (1991)
2. If at Faust You Don't Succeed (1993)
3. A Farce to Be Reckoned With (1995)

== Other novels and short novels ==
- This Immortal (1966) (initially serialized in abridged form in 1965 as ...And Call Me Conrad, the author's preferred title) – Hugo Award winner, 1966
- The Dream Master (1966) (an expansion of the novella "He Who Shapes" [1965]); the film Dreamscape began from Zelazny's outline which he based on "He Who Shapes"/The Dream Master, but he was not involved in the film after they bought the outline.)
- Lord of Light (1967) – Nebula Award nominee, 1967; Hugo Award winner, 1968
- Creatures of Light and Darkness (1969)
- Damnation Alley (1969) (on which a film of the same name was loosely based)
- Jack of Shadows (1971) – Hugo and Locus SF Awards nominee, 1972
- Today We Choose Faces (1973)
- Doorways in the Sand (1976) – Nebula Award nominee, 1975; Hugo Award nominee, 1976
- Bridge of Ashes (1976)
- My Name Is Legion (1976) (considered a fix-up novel in three parts, or a collection of three stories)
- Roadmarks (1979)
- Eye of Cat (1982)
- A Dark Traveling (1987)
- Here There Be Dragons (1992) (written 1968/69 and illustrated by Vaughn Bodē; delayed publication until 1992)
- Way Up High (1992) (written 1968/69 and illustrated by Vaughn Bodē; delayed publication until 1992)
- A Night in the Lonesome October (1993) (illustrated by Gahan Wilson) – Nebula Award nominee, 1994
- The Dead Man's Brother (2009) (mystery/thriller novel completed in 1971, finally published in 2009)

=== Collaborations ===
- Deus Irae (1976) (with Philip K. Dick)
- Coils (1982) (with Fred Saberhagen)
- The Black Throne (1990) (with Fred Saberhagen)
- The Mask of Loki (1990) (with Thomas T. Thomas)
- Flare (1992) (with Thomas T. Thomas)
- Wilderness (1994) (with Gerald Hausman)
- Psychoshop (1998) with Alfred Bester (completed by Zelazny from an unfinished manuscript by Bester)

=== Posthumous collaborations ===
Two books begun by Zelazny were completed by companion and novelist Jane Lindskold after Zelazny's death:

- Donnerjack (1997)
- Lord Demon (1999)

The adventure game Chronomaster (developed by DreamForge Intertainment, published by IntraCorp in 1996) was designed by Zelazny and Jane Lindskold (who also finished it after his death).

=== Collections ===
- Four for Tomorrow (1967) (later published in the UK as A Rose for Ecclesiastes)
- The Doors of His Face, The Lamps of His Mouth, and Other Stories (1971)
- The Illustrated Roger Zelazny (1978) (contents of hardcover and paperback differ)
- The Last Defender of Camelot (1980, Pocket Books and SFBC)
- The Last Defender of Camelot (1981, Underwood-Miller) (contains four stories not in the Pocket Books version)
- Alternities #6 (1981) (Special issue devoted entirely to Zelazny, contains rare stories and poems)
- Dilvish, the Damned (1982)
- Unicorn Variations (1983)
- Frost & Fire (1989)
- The Graveyard Heart/Elegy for Angels and Dogs (Tor Double, 1992) (with Walter Jon Williams, featuring a sequel to Zelazny's story by Williams)
- Gone to Earth / Author's Choice Monthly #27 (Pulphouse, 1992)
- The Last Defender of Camelot (ibooks, 2002) (Collection has the same name as earlier collection, but different contents.)
- Manna from Heaven (2003)
- The Doors of His Face, The Lamps of His Mouth, and Other Stories (ibooks, 2005) (adds two stories from Four for Tomorrow)
- The Collected Stories of Roger Zelazny (NESFA Press, 2009)
  - Volume 1: Threshold
  - Volume 2: Power & Light
  - Volume 3: This Mortal Mountain
  - Volume 4: Last Exit to Babylon
  - Volume 5: Nine Black Doves
  - Volume 6: The Road to Amber
- The Magic - October 1961-October 1967 (Positronic Publishing, 2018. Selected and with an introduction by Samuel R. Delany)
- Kalifriki (2022) (contains "Kalifriki of the Thread" and "Come Back to the Killing Ground, Alice, My Love")

=== Poetry collections ===
- Poems (1974)
- When Pussywillows Last in the Catyard Bloomed (1980)
- To Spin Is Miracle Cat (1981)
- Hymn to the Sun: An Imitation (1996, assembled by Zelazny but released after his death)
- Collected Stories (contains all of his known poetry including previously unpublished works)

=== Chapbooks ===
- Poems (1974)
- The Bells of Shoredan (Underwood-Miller, 1979)
- For a Breath I Tarry (Underwood-Miller, 1980)
- A Rhapsody in Amber (Cheap Street, 1981)
- The Last Defender of Camelot (Underwood-Miller, 1981) (just the story)
- The Bands of Titan / A Freas Sampler / A Dream of Passion (Ad Astra, 1986)
- The Doors of His Face, the Lamps of His Mouth (Pulphouse, 1991) (just the story; paperback and hardcover editions)
- And the Darkness is Harsh (Pretentious Press, 1994)
- The Last Defender of Camelot (Subterranean, 2003) (Zelazny's story plus George R. R. Martin's teleplay for Twilight Zone)

=== Anthologies edited by Zelazny ===
- Thurban 1, issue #3, 1953 (Zelazny was assistant editor; part one of Zelazny's short story "Conditional Benefit" appeared here)
- Senior Scandals (Euclid Senior High, 1955) (co-edited by Zelazny and Carl Yoke)
- Nebula Award Stories Three (Doubleday, 1968)
- Nozdrovia #1, 1968 (co-edited with Richard Patt)
- Forever After (Baen, 1995)
- Warriors of Blood and Dream (AvoNova, 1995)
- Wheel of Fortune (AvoNova, 1995)
- The Williamson Effect (Tor, 1996)

Zelazny was also a contributor to the Wild Cards shared world anthology series (edited by George R. R. Martin), following the exploits of his character Croyd Crenson, the Sleeper.

Zelazny created the Alien Speedway series of novels (Clypsis by Jeffrey Carver, Pitfall and The Web by Thomas Wylde) which appeared between 1986–87. His own story "Deadboy Donner and the Filstone Cup" appears to have been inspired by the outline that he wrote for Alien Speedway.

Zelazny created and edited a shared world anthology called Forever After. The frame story uses preludes, written by Roger, to connect the stories. This shared world involved stories by Robert Asprin, David Drake, Jane Lindskold, and Michael A. Stackpole. Forever After was published posthumously by Baen Books.

Following Zelazny's death, a tribute anthology entitled Lord of the Fantastic was released in 1998. This featured stories inspired by Zelazny, and personal recollections by contributors such as Robert Silverberg, Fred Saberhagen, Jennifer Roberson, Walter Jon Williams, Gregory Benford and many others.

In 2017, another tribute anthology entitled Shadows & Reflections: A Roger Zelazny Tribute Anthology was published. This was co-edited by Zelazny's son Trent Zelazny, included an afterword by his daughter Shannon Zelazny and a story by his partner and sometime coauthor Jane Lindskold, and featured a rarely seen story by Zelazny himself, as well as short stories by Steven Brust, Warren Lapine, Kelly McCullough, Mark Rich, Gio Clairval, Edward J. McFadden, Steve Perry, Gerald Hausman, Theodore Krulik, Lawrence Watt-Evans, Michael H. Hanson, and Shariann Lewitt.
