= Trumps of Doom =

Fantasy novel by Roger Zelazny

- Author: Roger Zelazny
- Language: English
- Series: The Chronicles of Amber
- Genre: Fantasy
- Publisher: Arbor House
- Publication date: May 1985
- Publication place: United States
- Media type: Print (hardcover)
- Pages: 183
- Award: Locus Award for Best Fantasy Novel (1986)
- ISBN: 0-87795-718-5
- OCLC: 11621840
- Dewey Decimal: 813/.54 19
- LC Class: PS3576.E43 T7 1985
- Preceded by: The Courts of Chaos
- Followed by: Blood of Amber

Trumps of Doom is a fantasy novel by the American writer Roger Zelazny, the first book in the second Chronicles of Amber series and the sixth book in the Amber series overall. Whereas the first series was narrated by Corwin, this series is narrated by his son, Merlin. Trumps of Doom won the Locus Award for Best Fantasy Novel in 1986.

== Plot summary ==
Merlin has spent the last several years on Earth learning computer science while building Ghostwheel, a trump- and Pattern-based computer, elsewhere in Shadow. Having completed this project, he wishes to know who has been trying to kill him every April 30—and why some of the better attempts failed—before he leaves Earth. He meets with his friend Lucas Reynard (Luke), a salesman, who tries to convince him to stay; Luke tells him that Julia Barnes, Merlin's ex-girlfriend, may be in trouble. Merlin investigates and finds Julia slain by creatures from another shadow.

Merlin investigates through Shadow, and he receives orders from King Random to shut down Ghostwheel. By this time, however, Ghostwheel has become sentient and capable of defending itself. Eventually, Luke—who turns out to be Brand's son—imprisons Merlin in a blue crystal cave, so that he can attempt to take control of Ghostwheel for himself.

== Reception ==
Kirkus Reviews wrote: "Inventive, incident-packed, often fascinating stuff, with flashes of wry humor--but there's not even a token resolution here, and it isn't satisfying in itself."

Frank Catalano of The Seattle Times wrote that the novel "moves along at such a breakneck pace that its abrupt ending leaves you teetering on the edge of a cliff."

Tim Preso of The Oregonian called the novel "exceedingly readable" with "well-developed characters"; however, he also wrote that Zelazny "seems to be treading familiar ground".

In Issue 34 of Abyss, Dave Nalle commented, "There is lots of action. The plot is fast moving and the characters are likeable if not too deep ... For the Zelazny fan or any fantasy buff, Trumps of Doom is an enjoyable read."
