= Knight of Shadows (disambiguation) =

Knight of Shadows is a fantasy novel by Roger Zelazny.

Knight of Shadows may also refer to:

- The Knight of Shadows: Between Yin and Yang, a 2019 Chinese film
- "Knight of Shadows", an episode of seaQuest DSV

== See also ==
- Shadow Knight (disambiguation)
