= Shadow Knight =

Shadow Knight may refer to:

- Shadow Knight (character), a Marvel Comics supervillain
- Shadow Knight (Amber Diceless Roleplaying Game), a supplemental rule book for Amber Diceless Roleplaying Game
- Shadow Knights, a 1991 video game

== See also ==
- Knight of Shadows (disambiguation)
