= Manna from Heaven =

2003 short story collection by Roger Zelazny

- Dust jacket from the first edition.
- Author: Roger Zelazny
- Cover artist: Bob Eggleton
- Language: English
- Genre: Science fiction and Fantasy
- Publisher: Wildside Press
- Publication date: 2003
- Publication place: United States
- Media type: Print (hardback)
- Pages: 192
- ISBN: 0-8095-3095-3
- OCLC: 55141594

Manna from Heaven is a collection of fantasy short stories by American writer Roger Zelazny. It was published in 2003 by Zelazny's estate, eight years after his death.

== Contents ==
Manna from Heaven contains 22 stories. The first 16 are stand-alone stories, while the last six tie into Zelazny's Chronicles of Amber series.

- "Godson"
- "Mana from Heaven"
- "Corrida"
- "Prince of the Powers of This World"
- "The Furies"
- "The Deadliest Game"
- "Kalifriki of the Thread"
- "Come Back to the Killing Ground Alice, My Love"
- "Lady of Steel"
- "Come to Me Not in Winter's White" (written with Harlan Ellison)
- "The New Pleasure"
- "The House of the Hanged Man"
- "Epithalamium"
- "The Last Inn on the Road"
- "Stowaway"
- "Angel, Dark Angel"
- "Prologue from the Trumps of Doom"

Merlin walks the Logrus, wearing his strangling cord Frakir.

- "The Salesman's Tale"

Luke flees the Pattern – having just spilled on it, not his own blood (which he apparently was in a position to do) but a harmless cup of tea, and bought himself a split second to trick even the Pattern that way – and takes refuge in the Crystal Cave. He and Vialle learn that the redistribution of the spikards will force a confrontation involving Amber and the Courts of Chaos.

- "Blue Horse, Dancing Mountains"

Corwin flees the Courts of Chaos through a part of Shadow called the Dancing Mountains, having been given a new steed – a sentient shapechanger named Shask – as a gift by his son Merlin. He eavesdrops on a game of chess between Dworkin and Suhuy, and learns he has an appointment at the Hall of Mirrors in Amber Castle.

- "The Shroudling and the Guisel"

Merlin's childhood sweetheart Rhanda appears. She warns him of an unknown sorcerer who seeks the throne of the Courts of Chaos and has sent a beast called a guisel to kill him. He succeeds in destroying it with the help of the Vorpal Blade, and sends another one back to pursue the mystery sorcerer.

- "Coming to a Cord"

Frakir escapes from Brand's bedpost where Merlin left her, locates Flora, and eventually asks Luke's help in returning to Merlin. A conversation with Flora is interrupted by a mystery sorcerer who enters and exits through mirrors, pursued by a weird beast called a guisel. Luke uses the power of Werewindle – revealed to be a transformed spikard, like Merlin's ring (and also Corwin's sword Grayswandir) – to destroy it.

- "Hall of Mirrors"

Corwin discovers that traveling through the Dancing Mountains made him the subject of an unusual spell. He returns to Amber Castle and meets Luke – who apparently prefers to be called by his alter-ego name, rather than his true name Rinaldo, even by those who know him as Rinaldo – and they enter the Hall of Mirrors and are forced to duel. Fiona and Mandor are present: It is unclear whether they are in charge, or merely blameless observers as they claim to be. Both are seriously wounded (their weapons forcing them into confrontation against their wills) but both survive. It is revealed that Castle Amber itself appears to be sufficiently sentient to be attempting to influence affairs.

== Reception ==
As of April 2025, the collection holds a rating of 4.01 out of 5 on the Goodreads website, with 33% of the 477 ratings being 5.
