= Sign of Chaos =

1987 novel by Roger Zelazny

- Author: Roger Zelazny
- Cover artist: Linda Burr
- Language: English
- Series: The Chronicles of Amber
- Genre: Fantasy
- Publisher: Arbor House
- Publication date: October 1987
- Publication place: United States
- Media type: Print (hardcover)
- Pages: 214 pp
- ISBN: 0-87795-926-9
- OCLC: 16004222
- Dewey Decimal: 813/.54 19
- LC Class: PS3576.E43 S54 1987
- Preceded by: Blood of Amber
- Followed by: Knight of Shadows

Sign of Chaos is a fantasy novel by American writer Roger Zelazny, published in 1987. It is the third novel in the second Chronicles of Amber series, and the eighth novel in the Amber series overall. The title of this book mirrors that of Sign of the Unicorn, the third book in the first Amber series.

== Plot summary ==
Merlin realizes that Wonderland, where he and Luke are trapped, is an LSD-induced hallucination made real by Luke's powers over shadow. As a Fire Angel (a vicious creature from Chaos) pursues them, Merlin administers medicine to Luke. The Fire Angel is weakened in a fight with the Jabberwock, and Merlin is able to finish it off with the vorpal sword. He leaves Luke to sober up.

Merlin seeks his stepbrother Mandor, who thinks that their half-brother Jurt may be trying to kill Merlin in order to take the throne of Chaos. Fiona contacts them, and they investigate a shadow-storm. Merlin and Mandor return to Amber; then, along with Jasra, they wrest the Keep of the Four worlds from Jurt and the sorcerer Mask. They learn that Jurt has (at least partially) turned himself into a living Trump, as Brand did, and that the sorcerer Mask is actually Merlin's ex-girlfriend Julia.

== Reception ==
H. J. Kirchoff of The Globe and Mail wrote that Zelazny "serves up his usual mixture of fast action and slick dialogue, and blends in enough mystery, magic, intrigue and love interest to keep the kettle simmering." Dennis O'Shea of United Press International wrote that the novel is "well-stocked with the wry wit and expansive imagination that endear Zelazny to his readers", even if its "complexities" are "not handled quite as deftly as we have come to expect from Zelazny." Drew Bittner of the Asbury Park Press called the novel "well written" and wrote: "It's worth buying the next book just to see how Zelazny will tie up all the threads into a whole tapestry."
