= Shadow Knight (Amber Diceless Roleplaying Game) =

Cover of Shadow Knight

Shadow Knight is a 1993 role-playing supplement for Amber Diceless Roleplaying Game published by Phage Press.

== Contents ==
Shadow Knight is a supplement in which concepts are taken from the Merlin novel series.

== Publication history ==
Shannon Appelcline noted that compared to their handling of Amberzine, "Phage Press never did as well in producing actual game material. Shadow Knight (1993) - a supplement focusing on the 'Merlin' cycle of Amber books - finally did appear at the very end of 1993 but it was almost two years late by that time. Wujcik had not liked the manuscripts that several different freelancers had produced and so ended up rewriting the book himself." Appelcline also noted that "Shadow Knight received some poor reviews that impacted Wujcik creatively. As many of these were probably the result of fans that did not like the Merlin books - which had always been controversial among Amber fans - as those who did not like Shadow Knight itself."

== Reception ==
Steve Crow reviewed Shadow Knight in White Wolf #48 (Oct., 1994), rating it a 4 out of 5 and stated that "Overall, Shadow Knight is an excellent sourcebook to add to any Amber campaign. The game mechanic sections are a little awkward and unnecessary, but you may still find them interesting."

== Reviews ==
- Magister (Issue 45 - Sep 1994)
- Dragon #209
