= Blood of Amber =

1986 novel by Roger Zelazny

- Author: Roger Zelazny
- Cover artist: Ned Dameron (limited)
- Language: English
- Series: The Chronicles of Amber
- Genre: Fantasy
- Publisher: Arbor House (trade); Underwood-Miller (limited)
- Publication date: 1986
- Publication place: United States
- Media type: Print (hardcover)
- Pages: 215
- ISBN: 0-87795-829-7 (trade); ISBN 0-88733-058-4 (limited)
- OCLC: 13361327
- Dewey Decimal: 813/.54 19
- LC Class: PS3576.E43 B58 1986
- Preceded by: Trumps of Doom
- Followed by: Sign of Chaos

Blood of Amber is a fantasy novel by American writer Roger Zelazny, published in 1986. It is the second book in the second Chronicles of Amber series, and the seventh book in the Amber series overall.

== Plot summary ==
Merlin escapes from the crystal cave, and he decides to gain leverage over Luke by rescuing his mother from the Keep of the Four Worlds. He spars with the sorcerer who now controls the keep, and who seems to know him. He escapes with the petrified Jasra; then he returns to Amber where an unusual Trump summoning imprisons him in the Mad Hatter's tea party.

== Reception ==
Dave Langford reviewed Blood of Amber for White Dwarf magazine. He stated that "despite a few good wisecracks and neat ideas, Corey's plethora of powers can't revitalize the over-familiar Amber gimmickry and revenge plot".

== Reviews ==
- Review by Debbie Notkin (1986) in Locus, #307 August 1986
- Review by Laurel Anderson Tryforos (1986) in Fantasy Review, October 1986
- Review by Don D'Ammassa (1986) in Science Fiction Chronicle, #85 October 1986
- Review by John Gregory Betancourt (1987) in Fantasy Book, March 1987
- Review by Tom Easton (1987) in Analog Science Fiction/Science Fact, July 1987
- Review by Graham Andrews (1987) in Paperback Inferno, #69

== Sources ==
- Chalker, Jack L.; Mark Owings (1998). The Science-Fantasy Publishers: A Bibliographic History, 1923-1998. Westminster, MD and Baltimore: Mirage Press, Ltd. p. 672.
