= Xyllomer =

- Developer: Project community
- Engine: DGD
- Platform: Platform independent
- Release: 1991
- Genre: Medieval fantasy RP MUD
- Mode: Multiplayer

Xyllomer is a MUD, a text-based online role-playing game, founded in 1991 as PaderMUD (after the University of Paderborn, where it was hosted). It was the first publicly accessible MUD to use Dworkin's Game Driver. It has been hosted in Germany throughout its history.

== Game characteristics ==
Xyllomer's setting is medieval fantasy in theme. Roleplaying is enforced, with strict penalties for improper out-of-character behavior, including conducting out-of-character communication through in-character channels. Game mechanics are hidden behind abstractions so as to enhance immersiveness.

Xyllomer supports a gameinfo command at its initial login screen to help new players orient themselves.

== History ==
A screenshot of one of the several login screens Xyllomer displays

In 1992, PaderMUD ported from its original LPMud 2.4.5 infrastructure to the CD gamedriver and mudlib.

In 1993, PaderMUD ported from the CD driver to DGD, becoming the first public DGD MUD.

In 1995, PaderMUD changed its name to Xyllomer.

In 1996, Xyllomer moved to its own dedicated server, which has been funded by the players through donations. Previously, it had been hosted on a server owned by the University of Paderborn.

In 2004, Xyllomer's login screen was quoted as an example of civic-minded warnings issued to players regarding the time-consuming nature of MUDs.

In 2010, Xyllomer has been upgraded to the latest DGD version and the wizards started to transform it into a permanent world setup.
