= Dworkin's Game Driver =

LPMud server

DGD, Dworkin's Game Driver (at one time called Dworkin's Generic Driver), is an LPMud server written by Felix A. "Dworkin" Croes. DGD pioneered important technical innovations in MUDs, particularly disk-based object storage, full world persistence, separation of concerns between driver and mudlib, runtime morphism, automatic garbage collection, lightweight objects and LPC-to-C compilation.

== History ==
DGD's first public release was on August 12, 1993.

The first publicly available MUD to use DGD was PaderMUD (later Xyllomer), in December 1993.

The original primary development MUD for DGD was The Pattern, referencing The Chronicles of Amber (like Croes's pseudonym Dworkin, which refers to Dworkin Barimen). It was taken offline sometime before February 1997.

During the 1994–1995 academic year, DGD was a core element in a master's thesis at the Katholieke Universiteit Leuven. As part of the thesis work, a deterministic mechanism for handling arrays and mappings passed between objects was devised.

In December 1995, exclusive rights to commercial use of DGD were acquired by BeeHive Internet Technologies, Inc., which sold an exclusive license to ichat in January 1996. ichat used DGD to establish the first Yahoo! chatrooms. ichat then became Acuity Corporation, which sold a sublicense to Skotos in February 1999. Skotos used DGD to create a series of online games. Acuity Corporation was later acquired by Quintus Corporation. In March 2001, the exclusive license was terminated due to the bankruptcy of that company.

In 2002, DGD was used for academic research into persistent distributed object systems.

In August 2005, DGD's commercial use rights were assigned back to Dworkin B.V., Croes's company.

On February 3, 2010, DGD 1.4 was released as open-source software.

== See also ==
- Application server
- Comparison of application servers
