= Nine Princes in Amber (video game) =

1985 video game

- Developer: Spinnaker Software
- Publisher: Telarium
- Designers: Byron Preiss; Roger Zelazny
- Engine: SAL
- Platforms: Apple II, Atari ST, Commodore 64, MS-DOS, MSX2
- Release: 1985
- Genre: Adventure
- Mode: Single player

Nine Princes in Amber is an interactive fiction video game with graphics. The game was published by Telarium, a subsidiary of Spinnaker Software, in 1985. The game is based upon the fantasy novels Nine Princes in Amber and The Guns of Avalon by Roger Zelazny.

== Gameplay ==
The single-player adventure is controlled via typed keyboard commands. Words and sentences are entered in a text parser. The player uses action commands (e.g. take, sit) and communication commands (e.g. ask, demand, hug) for the interaction with non-player characters. There are 40 different possible solutions to end the game.

== Plot ==
The plot takes place in a fictional fantasy world. The player prince Corwin is the son of King Oberon, who rules the kingdom of Amber. Corwin wants to become king, but his eight brothers, especially his brother Eric, are also interested in the throne of Amber. Prince Corwin must escape assassination attempts and intrigues enacted by his siblings, and yet must forge alliances with some of his siblings to become the reigning king of Amber.

== Development ==
The game was implemented for the Commodore 64, MS-DOS, Atari ST, MSX2, and Apple II. The MSX2 version is a translation into Spanish ("Nueve Principes en Amber") with new illustrations. It is based upon the fantasy novels Nine Princes in Amber (Doubleday 1970) and The Guns of Avalon (Doubleday 1972) by Roger Zelazny. It was developed by a group of 20 people at Spinnaker Software and published by Telarium (1985). The design, writing, and game coding was done by Andrea Bird.

== Reception ==
In 1986, a German reviewer called Nine Princes in Amber a precious adventure ("Edel-Adventure"). He praised the intelligent writing, the suspenseful storyline and the text parser. In 2006, a study about the history of interactive fiction maintained, that on the one hand, Nine Princes in Amber "is not a bad game – in fact, it is one of Telarium's best, and working out the conversational 'puzzles' can actually be oddly satisfying at times", but on the other hand, the authors "seemed to be aiming so much higher." They wanted to create a very ambitious gameplay. Due to hardware constraints in the 1980s and general limitations of character interaction in interactive fiction, they were not able to actualize this aim completely. In 1987, Antic stated that the game had "uneven plot pacing and content ranging from the exciting to the banal". The magazine criticized the port from 8-bit computers not fully using the Atari ST's more powerful graphics and sound, and "substandard" text parser. The reviewer described the game as "essentially a computerized 'Classics Illustrated' adaptation of the books rather than an adventure game in the Infocom or even Scott Adams tradition", stating that he finished it in "about two (interrupted) hours". After completing the game, he found that reloading saved games to see another of the 40 endings was interesting. The reviewer concluded "this game comes up short. It's simply not interesting or well-executed enough to be recommended", suggesting that readers buy The Pawn instead.
