= Creatures of Light and Darkness =

1969 science fiction novel by Roger Zelazny

- Cover of first edition (hardcover)
- Author: Roger Zelazny
- Cover artist: James Starrett
- Language: English
- Genre: Science fiction
- Publisher: Doubleday
- Publication date: 1969
- Publication place: United States
- Media type: Print (hardback & paperback)
- Pages: 187
- ISBN: 0-575-07344-6

Creatures of Light and Darkness is a 1969 science fiction novel by American writer Roger Zelazny. Long out of print, it was reissued in April 2010. The novel is set in the far future, with humans on many worlds. Some humans have god-like powers or perhaps are actually gods—the names and aspects of various Egyptian gods are used. Elements of horror and technology are mixed, and the novel shares elements with cyberpunk.

Creatures of Light and Darkness was originally conceived and written as merely a writing exercise in perspective. He wrote it in present tense; constructed an entire chapter in poetry; and made the concluding chapter into the script of a play. He never intended it for publication, but when Samuel R. Delany heard about it from Zelazny, Delany convinced a Doubleday editor to demand that Zelazny give him the manuscript. Consequently, Zelazny dedicated the novel to Delany.

Unlike other books by Zelazny, such as Lord of Light or the series The Chronicles of Amber, this novel is more poetic in style, and it contains less straightforward action. However, as in other novels, Zelazny incorporates ancient myth—in this case from Ancient Egypt and (to some extent) Greece—and he weaves ultra-futuristic technology together with fantasy elements.

== Plot summary ==
=== Background ===
The Universe was once ruled by the god Thoth, who administered the different forces in the Universe to keep things in balance. In time, he delegated this administration to his "Angels" (other god-like beings), who were each in charge of different "stations", or forces in the Universe. Such stations include the House of the Dead, the House of Life, and the House of Fire.

At some point, Thoth had awakened a dormant, malevolent force on a distant planet. This dark force, called The Thing That Cries In The Night, is so powerful and malevolent that it nearly obliterated Thoth's wife and threatens to consume the galaxy. Thoth works to contain and destroy the creature, and in so doing, neglects his duties in maintaining the Universe. The Angels become rebellious and use the power vacuum to fight amongst themselves for dominance.

Thoth's son Set, who through an anomaly in Time is also his father, fights the creature across a devastated planet. Just as Set is about to destroy the creature, he is attacked by the Angel Osiris, who unleashes the Hammer That Smashes Suns, a powerful weapon that nearly kills Set and the creature. Thoth's brother, Typhon, who was helping Set in the battle, vanishes without a trace and is presumed dead. (Typhon appears as a black horse-shadow, without a horse to cast it. He contains within himself something called Skagganauk Abyss, which resembles a black hole, not a term in common use at the time.)

The Thing That Cries In The Night survived the blast, and so Thoth, who has meanwhile been utterly overthrown by his Angels, has no choice but to contain the dark force until he can find a way to destroy it. He also revives the personality of his wife and keeps her safe on a special world known only to him, where the seas are above the atmosphere, not below them. He also scatters Set's weapons and armor across the Universe for safekeeping in the event that Set can ever be found. Having been overthrown, he is now dubbed The Prince Who Was A Thousand by all in the Universe.

Some of the surviving Angels hide among the peoples of the Universe as mysterious "immortals", but others—Osiris and Anubis—take over the House of Life and the House of Death, respectively. Other stations are abandoned, and Osiris and Anubis are the only two powers in the Universe now. Osiris cultivates life where he can, while Anubis works to destroy it. Plenty and famine, proliferation and plague, overpopulation and annihilation, alternate in the Worlds of Life between the two Stations, much to the detriment of those who inhabit them.

=== Places ===
The geography of this universe contains several curious places:

- The House of Life, ruled by Osiris, contains a room in which Osiris has reduced various people in his past into furnishings. These furnishings can speak (or scream) via wall-mounted speakers.
  - A skull (with brain) for a paperweight.
  - An enemy whose nervous system is woven into a rug. Osiris enjoys jumping on the rug.
- In the House of the Dead, numerous dead people of the Six Intelligent Races lie on invisible catafalques until Anubis requires them to go through the motions of pleasure—eating, drinking, dancing, making love—without any real enjoyment. Anubis likes to watch. He also stages fights between champions from the Six Races: sometimes the victor gets a job—and a name.
- The planet Blis is filled to bursting with people who are inexhaustibly fertile and do not know death: the whole planet is covered with 14 interlocking cities. Indeed, one man agrees to commit suicide in front of an audience, for money to be given to his family, because most people on Blis have never seen a death. He does so by self-immolation, after receiving the Possibly Proper Death Litany (also called the Agnostic's Prayer).
- On fog-shrouded D'donori, warlords raid each other solely to capture prisoners, who will be vivisected by the town scryer, or augur. By examining their entrails, he predicts the future and answers questions.
- On an unnamed planet, the sea is above the atmosphere. Here, the Prince Who Was a Thousand keeps Nephytha, his wife, who was disembodied and cannot survive on a normal planet.
- In a cave, a dog worries a glove that has seen better centuries. The three-headed canine is apparently Cerberus.
- On another planet, drug-maddened spearmen protect and castrated priests worship a pair of old shoes.

== The Agnostic's Prayer ==
Insofar as I may be heard by anything, which may or may not care what I say,
I ask, if it matters, that you be forgiven for anything you may have done or failed to do which requires forgiveness.

Conversely, if not forgiveness but something else may be required to ensure any possible benefit for which you may be eligible after the destruction of your body,
I ask that this, whatever it may be, be granted or withheld, as the case may be, in such a manner as to insure your receiving said benefit.
I ask this in my capacity as your elected intermediary between yourself and that which may not be yourself, but which may have an interest in the matter of your receiving as much as it is possible for you to receive of this thing, and which may in some way be influenced by this ceremony.

Amen.

This prayer, also called the "Possibly Proper Death Litany," is uttered by one of the main characters, Madrak, to shrive a man about to commit suicide for money (given to his family).

"The Agnostic's Prayer" is cited by Larry Niven in his short story "What Can You Say About Chocolate-Covered Manhole Covers", where it is used as the sacrament in a formal divorce ceremony.

== Reception ==
Algis Budrys gave Creatures of Light and Darkness an uneasily positive review, praising its "rich, satisfactory detail and really moving human interplay," but warning that its unusual narrative technique "will probably baffle and infuriate" many readers. James Blish, however, found the novel "a flat failure," even though "Some parts are evocative in the authentic and unique Zelazny manner." He particularly faulted Zelazny's decision to end Creatures as a scene from a play, but "a scene which absolutely demands straightforward, standard narrative and for which the playscript is the worst possible choice."

== Publisher's error ==
During the era when the novel was published, Doubleday did not remainder its unsold science fiction when its sales cycle was complete; instead, the publisher simply destroyed the unsold copies. After Creatures of Life and Darkness was issued in paperback, Doubleday mishandled its inventory, causing most of the print run of Zelazny's next novel, the just-published Nine Princes in Amber, to be destroyed in error.

== Sources ==
- Levack, Daniel J. H. (1983). Amber Dreams: A Roger Zelazny Bibliography. San Francisco: Underwood/Miller. pp. 25–26. ISBN 0-934438-39-0.
