= The Dark World =

1946 novel by Henry Kuttner

- First book edition
- Author: Henry Kuttner, C. L. Moore (assumed)
- Cover artist: Gray Morrow
- Language: English
- Genre: Science fantasy
- Publisher: Ace Books
- Publication date: 1965 (first book publication)
- Publication place: United States
- Media type: Print (Paperback)
- Pages: 126
- OCLC: 2707385

The Dark World is a science fantasy novel credited to Henry Kuttner, although his wife C. L. Moore may have been an uncredited collaborator, or possibly even the author. The novel was first published in the July 1946 issue of Startling Stories, then reprinted in the Winter 1954 issue of Fantastic Story Magazine. Its first book edition was issued by Ace in 1965, followed by a British edition by Mayflower Books in 1966. A French translation appeared in 1972. The novel was reprinted in full in Issue #5 of Amberzine in 1992, and also collected in a 1997 paperback omnibus, The Startling Worlds of Henry Kuttner. Roger Zelazny, author of The Chronicles of Amber, credits this book as being one of his primary influences during his youth.

== Summary ==
The protagonist is airman Edward Bond, who discovers that he shares his body with an alternate version of himself, a despotic wizard named Ganelon. Bond travels through a portal into the fantastical alternate dimension and enters a conflict: the Coven (consisting of a sorceress, a werewolf and an immortal) fight for Ganelon while the white witch Freydis leads a rebellion against him. Trapped between the two sides, Bond/Ganelon battle for supremacy over their shared mind and the fate of a world.

== Authorship ==
As with so much of the work of Kuttner and his wife and collaborator C.L. Moore, the exact authorship of this novel is unclear. It is generally credited to Kuttner alone; however, most of the couple's work after marriage was done in collaboration, and they frequently worked together so closely as to obscure the extent of their individual contributions. Critic Stefan R. Dziemianowicz has suggested that Bond's split personality in the novel is "consistent with CLM's deployment of psychologically conflicted characters in her earlier fiction." Brian Stableford's article on Kuttner in the same encyclopedia also names Moore as a co-author. The Encyclopedia of Science Fiction concludes that it is "safe to assume that many titles signed as by Kuttner alone are collaborations, though somewhat less safe to assume that the reverse applies." Allen Varney believed that The Dark World was entirely written by Moore.

== Reception ==
Roger Zelazny said that the Kuttner story that had the greatest impression on him when younger was The Dark World and remarked that much of its appeal comes from its "colorful, semi-mythic characters and strong action." He cited Kuttner (and C. L. Moore) as major influences on his work, noting that Jane Lindskold identified a number of specific influences from Kuttner and Moore in his own work, particularly The Chronicles of Amber.

The Encyclopedia of Science Fiction reviewed The Dark World as archetypal science fantasy, which "neatly fused Kuttner's vigorous plotting with Moore's romanticism." E. F. Bleiler, describing the novel as "Fantastic adventure in the mode of A. Merritt," concluded that it was "not one of Kuttner's better works."
