= The Courts of Chaos =

1978 novel by Roger Zelazny

- Author: Roger Zelazny
- Cover artist: Connor "Freff" Cochran (1st ed.)
- Language: English
- Series: The Chronicles of Amber
- Genre: Fantasy
- Publisher: Doubleday
- Publication date: 1978
- Publication place: United States
- Media type: Print (hardback)
- ISBN: 0-385-13685-4
- OCLC: 4036161
- Dewey Decimal: 813/.5/4
- LC Class: PZ4.Z456 Co PS3576.E43
- Preceded by: The Hand of Oberon
- Followed by: Trumps of Doom

The Courts of Chaos is a fantasy novel by American writer Roger Zelazny, the fifth book in the Chronicles of Amber series. It was first published in serial format in Galaxy Science Fiction magazine.

This novel ends the first Amber series, which is narrated by Corwin. The second series begins with Trumps of Doom, whose protagonist is his son, Merlin.

Corwin must ride the entire length of the multiverse, from Amber to the Courts of Chaos, while Oberon attempts to repair the Pattern. At the same time, Brand pursues Corwin, trying to steal the Jewel of Judgement.

== Plot summary ==
Corwin sulks in Castle Amber's library while Oberon gives the family orders. Random persuades Corwin to leave, but they encounter a real-life scene mirroring Corwin's earlier experience in Tir-na Nog'th. Prevented from interfering by an invisible force, they watch as Corwin's sword appears and chops off Benedict's new arm.

Dara and Martin are with Benedict. Corwin learns from Martin's trumps that the crossbowman who spared him is Merlin. Dara tells how Brand bargained with the Courts of Chaos. They wished to replace him with Merlin, but Dara feared that neither would keep their word.

Still unconvinced, Corwin contacts Fiona. She confirms Dara's authority, and says that Oberon is about to repair the Pattern. Hoping to save Oberon, Corwin grabs the Jewel and attempts to walk the primal pattern himself, but he is stopped by Oberon or Dworkin. Oberon has a final talk with his son. Corwin explains that he no longer wants to rule.

Once Corwin confirms Dara's authority, Benedict uses the trump of the Courts of Chaos to begin his attack. Dara talks to Corwin. Dara then leaves to give the rest of the family their orders. Gérard is ordered to stay and guard Amber, while Julian and Random are to stay in Arden.

Oberon arrives, and asks Corwin for some of his blood. He breathes life into the blood, and it becomes a red raven. Oberon tells Corwin that the raven will follow him through shadow. Corwin's orders are to hellride towards Chaos as fast as possible. He must bear the Jewel through shadow.

Corwin says goodbye to his father, and sets off. Now that he knows that Amber is just the first Shadow, he finds he can shift shadow there more easily. As he rides towards Chaos, he follows the Black Road. After a time, he notices that the Black Road is beginning to come apart; shortly after, the raven arrives and gives him the Jewel. Corwin is unsure whether this means that Oberon has succeeded or failed.

Brand traps Corwin in a small shadow, telling him that he saw through shadow, watching Oberon fail, and that Corwin must now give him the Jewel so he can create a new Pattern. Corwin refuses, and escapes from the shadow by traveling in a circle instead of straight. He notices an unusually large storm following him, and takes refuge in a cave. The cave's other occupant, a nameless stranger who has also sought shelter from the storm, casually mentions some local legends about the Archangel Corwin, who, according to scripture will ride before a storm at the end of the world. The real Corwin dismisses this story as unhelpful and commands the Jewel to quell the storm. Eventually, he falls asleep.

When he wakes, his horse has been kidnapped. He says goodbye to the stranger and tracks his horse to a cave, blocked off by a large boulder, which he shatters. Inside, leprechauns are celebrating a feast. Observing his great strength, they return his horse and invite him to join them. Succumbing to their odd charm, he starts to fall asleep, but rouses himself in time to see them preparing to slaughter him. He awakes and rushes outside. As he leaves, the leader of the wee folk recognizes him as the Archangel Corwin from local legends, mentioned before by the nameless stranger.

He starts to move into shadow, but as he moves further from the cave where he slept the universe starts to come apart around him. He realizes that the storm was a wave of Chaos, moving away from Amber as the multiverse is destroyed. He begins to doubt whether Oberon was successful.

Using the jewel, he is able to return to the diminishing multiverse. A strange lady dines with him and attempts to seduce him, but remembering his encounter with the pale lady on the black road (who may or may have not been a copy of Dara), and that he's working to a deadline, he declines.

Brand ambushes him with a crossbow, accidentally mortally wounding his horse but, after a fight, the blood raven reappears, plucks out one of Brand's eyes, and they both vanish. Corwin puts down his horse and continues striding through shadow on foot.

Corwin cuts a branch off a tree as a walking aid. The tree complains, but when it learns that he is Oberon's son it gives him its blessing: Oberon planted the tree in Amber's distant past to mark the boundary between Order and Chaos. It tells him to plant the staff somewhere it will have the chance to grow.

A talking raven named Hugi (of the usual color) arrives, tells him that the tree's name was Ygg, and tries to distract Corwin with fatalistic philosophy. It shows Corwin the head of a mostly-drowned Giant, who will not even allow the possibility of rescue. A mythological jackal offers to lead Corwin on a shortcut to the Courts, but instead leads him to its lair, where Corwin kills it in self-defense. He finally finds a shadow with the Courts' sky, but is aghast to discover that the Courts still lie across a huge wasteland. The raven Hugi returns and pointedly tells him it knew all along, so he kills it for his dinner.

As the metaphysical storm approaches Chaos, Corwin decides that Oberon must have failed, so he plants his staff and begins to use the Jewel to inscribe a new Pattern. The process evokes memories of his former life in Paris, France, and is given the impression that these somehow shape the new Pattern. He finishes, but is exhausted, and he collapses at the new Pattern's center. Brand projects himself to Corwin and steals the Jewel. Corwin loses consciousness.

Corwin awakes to find the area surrounding his Pattern transformed. The sky is now white, and the staff has grown into a tree. Corwin realises that he is at the center of a Pattern, and commands it to teleport him to the Courts.

He arrives in the courts, only to be challenged to single combat by someone who introduces himself as Borel. Corwin recognizes him as Master at Arms of the Courts of Chaos and the teacher of Dara in swordsmanship. Borel removes his armour to make the fight fair, but Corwin, having no time for a fair fight, tries to run away, and slays Borel with underhanded tactics when he pursues. He does feel slightly guilty about it afterward.

Corwin finds Brand with Fiona, Random and Deirdre, at the edge of the Abyss. Fiona is keeping him psychically bound, but Brand has Deirdre as a hostage. Suddenly an image of Oberon fills the sky, telling them that Corwin must use the Jewel to save them from the oncoming Chaos storm, leaves the question of succession "[up to] the horn of the Unicorn", and gives them a blessing. Corwin makes use of the distraction and his attunement to the jewel to burn Brand, but Brand realizes what's happening and starts to cut Deirdre. She pulls herself free, and Brand is shot in the throat and then chest with a bow. He staggers and grabs Deirdre's hair. They both fall into the Abyss. Corwin tries to follow her and Random has to knock him out.

Corwin wakes up to see Caine there, alive and well. Caine explains how he wanted "to get to the root of the trouble in Amber" and, unsure whether Corwin or Brand was responsible, faked his own death (by killing one of his own shadows) to investigate more freely and tried to frame Corwin for it to get him pinned down. Caine then kept himself appraised of developments by spying on the others through the Trumps. It was he who shot Brand, using silver-tipped arrows, just in case, and also he who stabbed Corwin earlier.

They watch Amber's armies crush the forces of Chaos while the storm continues to advance. A funeral procession, led by Dworkin, emerges from the storm front, accompanied by all sorts of fantastic beasts. Fiona appears with Dara and Corwin's son, Merlin. Corwin discusses with Fiona the possibility that two Patterns now exist; she can't decide whether that is good or bad. Dara arrives, angry with Corwin for killing Borel, and then leaves. Merlin arrives with her, but stays, eager to learn more about his father, Corwin.

The Unicorn appears from the Abyss somehow, wearing the Jewel of Judgement. It examines each of the Amberites in turn, then kneels in front of Random, presenting him the Jewel, and in accordance with Oberon's message, the succession. The rest of the family kneel in front of him too, and pledge their allegiance to him as the new King. Random takes the Jewel, and Corwin is able to guide him through its attunement process. Corwin is exhausted, and stays with Random while the others go to the Courts, where they think they should be safe. Merlin stays, and asks to hear about his father's adventures. Corwin begins narrating the Chronicles to his son.

Random is successful, and the Trumps become active. They contact Gérard, who tells them that the multiverse is fine, although seven years have passed. Corwin reflects on his changed attitudes towards his family, and on the changes in himself.

== Sources ==
- Levack, Daniel J. H. (1983). Amber Dreams: A Roger Zelazny Bibliography. San Francisco: Underwood/Miller. pp. 23–24. ISBN 0-934438-39-0.
