= The Chronicles of Amber =

Fantasy book series

- Nine Princes in Amber (1970), book 1 of the series.
- Nine Princes in Amber (1970); The Guns of Avalon (1972); Sign of the Unicorn (1975); The Hand of Oberon (1976); The Courts of Chaos (1978); Trumps of Doom (1985); Blood of Amber (1986); Sign of Chaos (1987); Knight of Shadows (1989); Prince of Chaos (1991)
- Author: Roger Zelazny
- Country: United States
- Language: English
- Genre: Fantasy
- Publisher: Doubleday
- Published: 1970–1991
- Media type: Print (hardcover and paperback), audiobook, e-book
- Followed by: The Dawn of Amber

The Chronicles of Amber is a series of fantasy novels by American writer Roger Zelazny. The main series consists of two story arcs, each five novels in length. Additionally, there are a number of Amber short stories and other works. While Zelazny's will expressly forbade sequels by other authors, four posthumous prequels authorized by Zelazny's family were authored by John Gregory Betancourt.

== Background ==
In the prologue to the DC Comics adaptation of Nine Princes in Amber, Zelazny describes how the initial inspiration for the Amber series came from two abstract sources: the surreal, shifting sensation of an experience he had walking through Baltimore, and his longstanding fascination with decks of cards, particularly Tarot.

As he wandered Baltimore's unfamiliar streets, each turn seemed to reveal a different place, mood, or time — this experience became the seed of the concept of "walking through Shadow," a central mechanism in the Amber universe by which characters move through infinite alternate realities. At the same time, Zelazny had been intrigued by the symbolic and narrative possibilities of cards — an interest that evolved into the powerful, mystical Trump deck used by the royal family of Amber to communicate and travel across realms.

Zelazny likened the writing of the first novel to a Shadow walk itself: he discovered the world of Amber bit by bit, not inventing it wholesale but uncovering it as if it already existed, hidden just beyond the veil of ordinary perception.

== Premise ==
The Amber stories take place in a multiverse setting, composed of "shadows", alternate realities that exist in between two higher realities: Amber, and Chaos. These shadows, including Earth, are parallel worlds that exist in — and were created from — the tension between the opposing magical forces of Amber and Chaos. The two courts are diametrically opposed, with Amber being the central, "realest" reality, with shadows radiating out from it to end at The Courts of Chaos, which are situated at the edge of an abyss. Members of the royal family of Amber, after walking in a Pattern that is central to Amber, can travel freely through the Shadows. While traveling (shifting) between Shadows, they can alter reality or create a new reality by choosing which elements of which Shadows to keep or add, and which to subtract, eventually arriving at their chosen destination. Nobles of the Courts of Chaos who have traversed the Logrus are similarly able to travel through Shadows.

An alternate method of travel is via sets of cards, patterned after a Tarot deck. Known as Trumps, the Major Arcana are depictions of the royal family and they can be used to contact, and/or travel to, another willing family member instantly. Trumps can also depict specific places.

== The Chronicles ==
Ten Amber novels were written by Roger Zelazny. The series of books was published over the years from 1970 to 1991. Portions of the first novel, Nine Princes in Amber, had previously been published in Kallikanzaros (No. 1, June 1967, and No. 3, December 1967). The novels Sign of the Unicorn, The Hand of Oberon, and The Courts of Chaos first appeared in abridged, serialized versions in Galaxy Science Fiction. The Guns of Avalon and five later "Merlin Cycle" Amber novels were not serialized or excerpted.

Several Chronicles of Amber omnibus volumes have also been published, collecting the five novels of the original "Corwin Cycle" in one volume, the five novels of the "Merlin Cycle" in another volume, and later (in The Great Book of Amber) all ten novels in a single volume.

=== The Corwin cycle ===
The first five novels are narrated in the first person by Corwin, a prince of Amber, as he describes his adventures and life upon re-encountering his family after a loss of memory and an absence of centuries.

=== The Merlin Cycle ===
The next five novels focus on Merlin, Corwin's son. These stories are held by some fans to be less of a fantasy classic than the first five due to the difference in writing style, direction and setting. One criticism of the sequence is that it revolved around the dealing with and acquisition of ever more powerful artifacts and entities, in a kind of technological/magical arms race.

==== Trumps of Doom (1985) ====
Trumps of Doom won the Locus Award for Best Fantasy Novel in 1985.

==== Blood of Amber (1986) ====
Blood of Amber was nominated for the Locus Award for Best Fantasy Novel in 1987.

==== Sign of Chaos (1987) ====
Sign of Chaos was nominated for the Locus Award for Best Fantasy Novel in 1988.

=== Short stories ===
For the limited 1985 edition of Trumps of Doom, Zelazny wrote a prologue that details Merlin's passage through the Logrus. After completing the Merlin Cycle, Zelazny wrote five Amber short stories, in which he began to tease the threads of the story into a new configuration. Zelazny died shortly after completing the last of these short stories, which were collected in Manna from Heaven (2003), along with the Trumps of Doom prologue and sixteen unrelated stories.

An unfinished sixth story, "A Secret of Amber", was an informal collaboration co-written in alternating sections by Zelazny and Ed Greenwood over a period of years. It was published in Amberzine in 2005, then included in The Collected Stories of Roger Zelazny, Volume 6: The Road to Amber, published by NESFA Press in 2009.

Readers have speculated about the correct internal order of the stories. Zelazny has said that the correct order for the stories is the order in which they were written:

- "A Secret of Amber" (Amberzine #12–15, March 2005)
- "The Salesman's Tale" (Amberzine No. 6, by Phage Press, February 1994 and Ten Tales, edited by John Dunning, 1994)
- "Blue Horse, Dancing Mountains" (Wheel of Fortune, edited by Roger Zelazny, 1995)
- "The Shroudling and the Guisel" (Realms of Fantasy, October 1994)
- "Coming to a Cord" (Pirate Writings, Number 7, 1995)
- "Hall of Mirrors" (Castle Fantastic, edited by John DeChancie and Martin Greenberg, March 1996)

The latter five stories tell a linked tale from several viewpoints. Zelazny had planned to write more, and to eventually publish a collection of Amber short stories.

In 2020 Amber Limited released the short stories as a collection, titled "Seven Tales in Amber", with an introduction written by Warren Lapine.

=== Dawn of Amber series ===
Several years after Zelazny's death, his estate authorized a new series of Amber novels, and John Gregory Betancourt was selected as the writer. Betancourt's Dawn of Amber series, which took its name from the title of the first volume, is a prequel to Zelazny's work, taking place centuries or millennia before Nine Princes in Amber. It is told from the point of view of Corwin's father Oberon, and like Zelazny's novels, the series is narrated in first person.

Four novels, out of five that had been planned, were published by ibooks:

- The Dawn of Amber (2002)
- Chaos and Amber (2003)
- To Rule in Amber (2004)
- Shadows of Amber (2005)

Having ended the fourth book on a cliffhanger, Betancourt never wrote the planned and scheduled fifth volume, Sword of Chaos. After Byron Preiss, the owner of ibooks, died, the publishing company filed for bankruptcy, and Betancourt announced in February 2006 that the series had been canceled. After a meeting with the publisher's new owner, Betancourt had brief hopes of renewed interest in the series from ibooks, but in August 2007 he announced his conclusion that the project was dead.

Betancourt stated that one of his primary motivations for agreeing to write the new books was to keep Zelazny's books and stories alive and in print, and to prevent them from fading into obscurity. He cited Robert E. Howard's Conan, Edgar Rice Burroughs's Tarzan, and Sir Arthur Conan Doyle's Sherlock Holmes as examples of how later authors had successfully continued and extended the stories of iconic characters long after their creators had died. In response to concerns that the Dawn of Amber series seemed to contradict some ideas or rules of the Amber universe as stated in Zelazny's original ten books, Betancourt stated in an interview that some of those contradictions would not prove valid by the end of his series.

The decision by Zelazny's literary executor to authorize a continuation of the Amber series was criticized by several acquaintances of Zelazny, including writers George R. R. Martin, Walter Jon Williams, and Neil Gaiman. They asserted that Zelazny had been quite averse to the idea of a "shared" Amber setting, and that he had clearly stated he did not want any others writing Amber stories. Gaiman wrote:

Well, I remember Roger talking to me and Steve Brust. We'd just suggested that if he did an anthology of other-people-write-Amber-stories that we'd be up for it (understatement) and he puffed on his pipe, and said — extremely firmly — that he didn't want anyone else to write Amber stories but him. I don't believe he ever changed his mind on that. When Roger knew he was dying, though, he did nothing to rewrite his will, which means that his literary executor is a family member from whom he was somewhat estranged — not someone who would have kept Roger's wishes paramount. Which is a pity. Would I love to write an Amber story? God, yes. Would Steve Brust? Absolutely. Will we? Nope because Roger told us he explicitly didn't want it to happen.

The series received a critical response from some Zelazny fans, who responded negatively to Betancourt's writing style and perceived lack of characterization, and considered his work to be fan fiction. The focus on Oberon also disappointed those who, after reading Zelazny's Merlin cycle and Amber short stories, believed that Zelazny had instead been planning another series of books to wrap up matters that he had left hanging. Zelazny's short stories, while tying up some of the loose ends, at the same time had opened doors to potential new stories going forward in the Amber universe, rather than a prequel.

=== Audio editions and other adaptations ===
==== Audiobooks ====
Sunset Productions did audio versions of Roger Zelazny reading the novels (except where noted), and produced them with sound effects. Sunset was bought out by Americana Publishing in 2002.

1. Nine Princes in Amber (abridged February 1992, unabridged April 1998)
2. The Guns of Avalon (abridged February 1992, unabridged November 1998)
3. Sign of the Unicorn (abridged September 1992, unabridged December 1998)
4. The Hand of Oberon (abridged October 1992, unabridged 1999) (last portion of the unabridged version read by Bruce Watson)
5. The Courts of Chaos (abridged only January 1993, unsure of unabridged date)
6. Trumps of Doom (abridged April 1993, unsure of unabridged date)
7. Blood of Amber (abridged July 1993, unsure of unabridged date)
8. Sign of Chaos (abridged November 1994, unabridged 2002)
9. Knight of Shadows (abridged only) (October 1996)
10. Prince of Chaos (abridged only) (read by Bruce Watson) (December 1998)

The National Library Service for the Blind and Physically Handicapped also created unabridged recorded versions of The Chronicles of Amber novels, including a 1979 recording of Nine Princes in Amber, read by Michael Moodie, and a later recording of Prince of Chaos, read by John Stratton.

Unabridged recordings created for the Canadian National Institute for the Blind included a 2001 recording of Nine Princes in Amber read by Richard Nazarewich.

In 2012, Audible released brand new recordings of The Chronicles of Amber, with Alessandro Juliani reading the first five books (the Corwin cycle) and Wil Wheaton reading the last five books (the Merlin cycle).

==== Graphic novel adaptations ====
The first two Amber books, Nine Princes in Amber and The Guns of Avalon, were adapted by writer Terry Bisson and various illustrators into comic books. Produced by Byron Priess Visual Productions, they were published by DC Comics in 1996, each in three parts.

==== Reference works ====
There are two published guides to Amber:

- Roger Zelazny's Visual Guide to Castle Amber by Roger Zelazny and Neil Randall (1988)
- The Complete Amber Sourcebook by Theodore Krulik (Avon Books, New York, 1996) ISBN 9780380754090

==== Games ====
===== Authorized games =====
In 1985, Telarium published the interactive fiction computer game Nine Princes in Amber, based on the first two books of the series.

Two authorized adventure books based on Amber, similar in concept to the Choose Your Own Adventure series, were written by Neil Randall and published in 1988:

- Seven No-Trump (1988), subtitled "A Crossroads Adventure"
- The Black Road War (1988), subtitled "Combat Command"

Erick Wujcik created the Amber Diceless Roleplaying Game, with two authorized publications:

- Amber Diceless Role-playing (1991)
- Shadow Knight (1995)

===== Other games =====
The online multiplayer role-playing game AmberMUSH was based in the Amber universe.

Lost Souls is a multiplayer medieval fantasy MUD in which Amber is the center of the cosmos and the Courts of Chaos is the outermost of the outer planes; Amberite and Chaosborn are among the playable races.

Zangband is a single-player roguelike computer game with a setting, magic system, and race options that are loosely derived from Zelazny's Amber multiverse, with the Serpent of Chaos as its final adversary.

== World ==
The series is based on the concept of parallel worlds, domination over them being fought between the kingdoms at the extreme ends of Shadow—Amber, the one true world of Order, and the Courts of Chaos. Amberites of royal blood are able to "walk in Shadow", mentally willing changes to occur around them. These changes are, in effect, representative of the Shadow-walker passing through different realities. Zelazny deals with some philosophical concepts about the nature of existence, compares and contrasts the ideas of Order and Chaos, and plays with the laws of physics—they can differ from Shadow to Shadow. Gunpowder for example does not ignite in Amber, which is why the characters all carry swords. There are apparently infinite realities, and the characters in the novels are not sure if these different universes are created as one walks through Shadow, or if they already exist and a Shadow-walker is able to slip from one to another. The series references the Wheeler–Everett interpretation of quantum-mechanics, and the Ghostwheel created by Merlin is said to "shuffle" through Shadows, seemingly suggesting that the multiverse exists independently of those who walk in Shadow.

The word "Trump" is used as both a noun and a verb. As a noun, it properly refers to a specialized type of hand-drawn tarot card depicting a person or a place. As a verb, it refers to using such a card for teleportation. The original tarot decks used by Amberites had some or all of their Major Arcana cards augmented with images of the royal family, and of at least one location, Castle Amber. A deck was given to each family member after they first walked the Pattern. The Trumps have the magical attribute of facilitating a psychic link to the person or place depicted on the card, enabling instant communication, travel, and even attack. If the card depicts a location, the user is able to teleport to that location. If the card depicts a person, the user concentrates on the image and attempts to reach out to the person to initiate contact. The recipient of a Trump contact does not need to have a card in their possession. An attempted contact may be blocked or declined by the receiving party, by an act of concentration. A Spikard is a type of magical object with hyperdimensional "lines of power" which connect it to sorcerous power caches in various universes. In the Amber novels and short stories, two shapes of Spikards are explicitly cited: rings and swords. Benedict's metal arm is never explicitly listed as a Spikard, but it does share with Corwin's Spikard sword Grayswandir the rare magical ability to bypass an existential barrier of intangibility.

== Literary influences ==
=== Inspirations and sources ===
The 1946 short novel The Dark World by Henry Kuttner and C.L. Moore was acknowledged by Zelazny as one inspiration. Similarities appear in the theme and in specific instances: some character names are common to both works, and they share the fantasy literary device of moving a present day, realistic character from the familiar world into a fantastical, alternate reality world, exposing the character to this shift as the reader experiences it. Zelazny is quoted as saying:

... the Kuttner story which most impressed me in those most impressionable days was his short novel The Dark World. I returned to it time and time, reading it over and over again, drawn by its colorful, semi-mythic characters and strong action ... looking back, Kuttner and [C. L.] Moore — and, specifically, The Dark World — were doubtless a general influence on my development as a writer. As for their specific influences—particularly on my Amber series—I never thought about it until Jane Lindskold started digging around and began pointing things out to me.

Zelazny admitted that the series was also inspired by Philip José Farmer's World of Tiers series, specifically the concepts of a powerful family in rivalry over the fate of multiple universes.

Given Zelazny's academic interest in the Medieval European period, it is not a stretch to see a possible influence in Henry Adams' 1905 work Mont Saint-Michel and Chartres, wherein he discusses the building of Chartres Cathedral, and the tidal-islet of Mont Saint-Michel, on the Normandy coast of France. However, these possible influences are not supported by Zelazny's own commentary about the origins of the Pattern. He indicated that he loosely based the Pattern in part on the Tree of Life or Sephiroth of Kaballah, and preferred to allow the reader to imagine what the actual Pattern looked like.

More generally, the series draws from many mythological sources as inspirations, especially Celtic (see Tír na nÓg), Norse mythology, and Arthurian legend. Zelazny cited Jessie L. Weston's 1921 book From Ritual to Romance as a key influence: it examined the pagan and Christian roots of the legends of King Arthur, the Wasteland myths, and the Holy Grail. For example, the Celtic Wasteland myth ties the barrenness of a land to a curse that a hero must lift; Corwin's curse is in part responsible for the Black Road.

Philosophical texts have influenced the series as well: many similarities exist between Amber and Plato's Republic (see the Allegory of the cave) and the classical problems of metaphysics, virtuality, solipsism, logic, possible worlds, probability, doubles and essences are also repeatedly reflected on.

The references made by Zelazny could be considered foreshadowing. For example, the name Ganelon was taken from the Matter of France, a body of classic French legends and literature that includes the Song of Roland. Throughout the Matter of France, Ganelon was often called "Ganelon the Traitor"; thus, for readers familiar with the original Ganelon, Zelazny's use of the name foreshadowed events in The Hand of Oberon where Ganelon purposefully loses a battle to spite Corwin. In the Song of Roland, Ganelon was also the stepfather of the protagonist Roland, which Zelazny may have used to foreshadow the relationship between Corwin and Ganelon at the conclusion of The Hand of Oberon.

=== Allusions to Shakespeare ===
Throughout the Chronicles, Zelazny alludes extensively to plays by William Shakespeare. It is not stated in the series whether the characters (who are usually well-read) are merely paraphrasing the bard for their own amusement, or if Shakespeare himself was telling stories that are reflections of Amber's history and future. It is implied that both variants are true simultaneously. The allusions include:

- Oberon, the King of Amber, is also the name of King of the Fairies from A Midsummer Night's Dream, although Shakespeare did not invent the character.
- The Forest of Arden is also the setting of Shakespeare's As You Like It.
- There are greater thematic allusions in the Chronicles, mostly to Hamlet. Corwin describes himself at the beginning of The Courts of Chaos as the "mad prince" of Amber, drawing a parallel between himself and the mad prince of Denmark. In addition, Corwin is contacted by the "ghost" of Oberon several times (before realizing that Oberon still lives), an obvious parallel to the plot of Hamlet. When dining with Lorraine, Corwin even refers to the attempted Trump contact by Oberon as a message from his "father's ghost".
- The rivalry between Corwin and Eric roughly parallels the Wars of the Roses, as portrayed in Shakespeare's "Wars of the Roses" cycle. Corwin's symbol, a silver rose, echoes the House of York's symbol, a white rose, and Eric's chosen color, red, echoes the House of Lancaster's symbol, a red rose.
- "Ill-met by moonlight", Deirdre's response to her rescue in Nine Princes in Amber (chapter 4): "Ill met by moonlight, proud Titania", is said by Oberon in A Midsummer Night's Dream.
- "To sleep, perchance to dream... Yeah, there's a thing that rubs", Corwin muses in Nine Princes in Amber (chapter 6). "To sleep: perchance to dream: ay, there's the rub", is from the To be, or not to be soliloquy in Hamlet.
- Very early in Nine Princes in Amber Corwin thinks to himself, "In the state of Denmark there was the odor of decay", a reference to "Something is rotten in the state of Denmark", a famous line from Hamlet.
- When Corwin first meets Eric in Nine Princes in Amber, Eric complains "It's true, that uneasy-lies-the-head bit". "Uneasy lies the head that wears a crown" is the final line in a monologue spoken by Henry IV in Act III, Scene i, of Henry IV, part 2 wherein Henry is pondering how sleep comes to even the most humble peasant easier than it does to the great.
- When he receives Eric's offer of peace in The Guns of Avalon, Corwin muses "...I believe you, never doubt it, for we are all of us honorable men" (chapter 8). In Marc Antony's funeral oration in Julius Caesar, he says, "For Brutus is an honourable man; So are they all; all honourable men".
- "So Childe Random to the dark tower came", Random recounts in his story of how he tried to rescue Brand. At the end of Act IV of King Lear, Edgar, disguised as the Poor Tom, the crazy beggar, babbles "Child Rowland to the dark tower came", an allusion itself to the fairy tale of Childe Rowland.
- Corwin, when describing the royal family to Ganelon in Sign of the Unicorn, says that Oberon had two other sons with Benedict's mother Cymnea, the first being Osric, who shares his name with a courtier in Hamlet.
- "Good night, sweet Prince", Brand says to Benedict in The Hand of Oberon (chapter 13). These are the words that Horatio speaks at the death of Hamlet.
- After watching his "dream" from Tir-na Nog'th play out in Amber in The Courts of Chaos (chapter 1), Corwin muses, "I looked back once to the empty place where my dream had come true. Such is the stuff". He alludes to Act IV, scene 1 of The Tempest, where, after causing spirits he has summoned to disappear, Prospero delivers the famous speech that includes the line "We are such stuff / As dreams are made on, and our little life / Is rounded by a sleep".

== Television rights and development ==
In July 2016, Skybound Entertainment announced that it was developing The Chronicles of Amber as a television project under Disney-ABC Domestic Television with Walking Dead creator and producer Robert Kirkman as an executive producer. Kirkman stated that "Chronicles of Amber is one of my favorite book series of all time, and one of my main inspirations for working in film and television. Getting to produce this project is the fulfillment of a lifelong dream. I can't wait to share this amazing story with a new generation of fans".

In August 2017, Kirkman and Skybound announced an agreement with Amazon to develop television projects to debut exclusively on Prime Video with distribution under Disney-ABC Domestic Television, without identifying any specific project as part of the deal. In January 2023, The Hollywood Reporter announced that the production company Spartina had joined Skybound Entertainment and Vincent Newman Entertainment’s existing partnership to develop the works into a drama series.
