= Four for Tomorrow =

1967 story collection by Roger Zelazny

- Cover of first-edition paperback
- Author: Roger Zelazny
- Language: English
- Genre: Science fiction
- Publisher: Ace Books
- Publication date: 1967
- Publication place: United States
- Media type: Print (hardback & paperback)
- Pages: 191 pp (first edition, paperback)
- OCLC: 5436844

Four for Tomorrow is the first story collection by Roger Zelazny, an American writer of science fiction and fantasy; it was published in paperback by Ace Books in 1967. British hardcover and paperback editions followed in 1969, under the title A Rose for Ecclesiastes. The first American hardcover was issued in the Garland Library of Science Fiction in 1975. A French translation appeared in 1980 (as Une rose pour l'Ecclésiaste). Paperback reissues continued from Ace Books and later from Baen Books into the 1990s.

== Contents ==
- Introduction (by Theodore Sturgeon)
- "The Furies" (in Amazing Stories magazine, 1965)
- "The Graveyard Heart" (in Fantastic magazine, 1964)
- "The Doors of His Face, the Lamps of His Mouth" (in F&SF magazine, 1965)
- "A Rose for Ecclesiastes" (in F&SF, 1963)

"The Doors of His Face, the Lamps of His Mouth" won a Nebula Award and was nominated for a Hugo Award. Similarly, "A Rose for Ecclesiastes" was nominated for a Hugo Award.

== Reception ==
Judith Merril described the collection as "what may well prove the best reading-buy of 1967". P. Schuyler Miller similarly commented that it was "certainly going to be one of the 'must' books" of the year. Algis Budrys said that the stories could have been written by eminent authors such Henry Kuttner and C. L. Moore, Theodore Sturgeon, Ray Bradbury, Avram Davidson, Philip Jose Farmer, or W. B. Yeats—but Zelazny "is beginning where other famous people have arrived".
