= Corwin of Amber =

Prince of Amber, main character in five books of Roger Zelazny's Chronicles of Amber

Corwin, a Prince of Amber, is the main character in the first five books of Roger Zelazny's Chronicles of Amber. He is the second son of Oberon and Faiella, and the father of Merlin. Within the novels, much of the action centers on Corwin and his family as they plot against one another conspiring to become the King of Amber.

In the first book of the series, Nine Princes in Amber, Corwin is identified as the eldest heir to the throne who has a legitimate claim. The matter of succession is hotly (and frequently) contested within the family, particularly during the prolonged absence of Oberon, and loyalties constantly shift among the undecided.

Corwin has dark hair and green eyes. His colors are black and silver (alternately gray), and his symbol is a silver rose. Corwin's favoured weapon is his sword Grayswandir, and his use of magic is extremely limited. While a few of his siblings exceed him in certain skills, such as arms (Benedict), strength (Gérard), and magic (Brand, Fiona, and Bleys), Corwin is well-balanced in most and is the best leader of them all. He also exemplifies stamina throughout the series.

Corwin is a quick and strategic thinker. Like his brothers and sisters, he boasts remarkable endurance and regeneration abilities, even more so than his siblings. While Corwin acts with a strong personal code of honor, he is also extremely practical; he will not engage in a fight of principle unless he believes he has a chance to win, and he is perfectly willing to employ subterfuge to defeat an opponent.

== Overview ==
Centuries before the opening of Nine Princes in Amber, while their father Oberon was still ruling in Amber, Corwin fought a duel (or, as Corwin referred to it later, "a simultaneous decision to murder each other") with Eric and nearly died. Eric, fearing their father's wrath, dumped Corwin in Elizabethan England during one of the recurrent plague outbreaks, most likely during one of the outbreaks in 1592 or 1603. Corwin recovered from the plague, but he suffered brain damage causing amnesia. He proceeded to live out several hundred years of Earth's history as a soldier of fortune, physician, and songwriter until the 1970s when he was in a car accident and confined to a clinic. Waking with no memories at all, Corwin escapes and makes contact with his sister Florimel, and soon after his brother Random, using them to return to Amber and finally regain his past (by re-walking on the copy of the Pattern located in the underwater city Rebma).

Once Corwin's memory returns, we learn that he is far from saintly. Like his siblings, he has created his own kingdom in Shadow to rule, calling it Avalon, and in doing so has cast shadows of himself and his kingdom around. While the original Avalon has been destroyed, in the shadow of Avalons his name is reviled for cruelty and arrogance. As Benedict says of the Avalon that he has adopted, acting as Lord Protector, "young boys are not named Corwin here, nor am I brother to anyone of that name". Even in Lorraine, the shadow of a shadow where he first encounters the forces of Chaos, he is remembered as a tyrant and butcher. However, it is also implied that this image may be distorted, as it is from a shadow of Avalon in which the real Corwin never ruled. Even so, it seems that his centuries on Earth have somehow mellowed his character, if not his ambition.

For an in-depth plot summary of Corwin's adventures following his time in the clinic, see Nine Princes in Amber, The Guns of Avalon, Sign of the Unicorn, The Hand of Oberon, and The Courts of Chaos.

== Grayswandir ==
Grayswandir, also known as the Night Blade, is Corwin's sword and it has a twin called Brand's Werewindle, the Day Sword. Both Grayswandir and Werewindle are inscribed with portions of the Pattern of Amber, granting them some power over Shadow. In addition, Corwin is able to call Grayswandir to him while travelling in Shadow: while escaping imprisonment by his brother Eric, en route Corwin determines that Grayswandir will be found inside a hollow tree he spots along the way, despite the sword being within Amber at that point. Later, while visiting Tir-na Nog'th, the blade enables Corwin to speak to the shades there, who had previously been unaware of his presence; when Corwin fights the shade of Benedict, he also learns that Grayswandir can harm him, perhaps as a result of the Pattern force within or due to Tir-na Nog'th being a distorted shadow of Amber.

In the Amber short story "Hall of Mirrors," Corwin revealed that Grayswandir and Werewindle were transformed spikards: Spikards are rings of power that existed before Amber and possibly even Chaos were created, and allow the bearer to tap into a power source somewhere in the Shadow.

The name Grayswandir echoes that of Graywand, the longsword of Fafhrd in Fritz Leiber's tales of Fafhrd and the Gray Mouser. Fafhrd naming consecutive swords all Graywand after losing each predecessor is the likely inspiration for the name of Grayswandir as it can reappear to Corwin after being lost.

== Corwin's Pattern ==
In The Courts of Chaos, Corwin inscribed a new pattern after he incorrectly concluded that Oberon's attempt to repair the Primal Pattern had failed. He created his pattern in a shadow originally resembling the nearby Courts of Chaos; when his Pattern was complete, it brought a measure of order to that Shadow. Corwin's Pattern created an additional emblem of Order, upsetting the balance of power between the original Pattern and the weakened Logrus of Chaos.

Corwin's Pattern is somewhat different from the original Primal Pattern and the copies of it. It feels more benevolent than Amber's Pattern and its Shadow copies; this is theorized by readers to be a result of Corwin's mellowed personality and his experiences in Paris, France, which he drew on while creating his Pattern. Corwin's Pattern treats its pattern ghosts as helpers rather than expendable tools.

It appears that the original Pattern wishes to incorporate Corwin's Pattern into itself, to further its advantage over the Logrus and that Corwin's Pattern is resisting its incursions, to the extent that the Pattern of Amber could not subdue the independence of Corwin's without being sufficiently weakened to lay itself open to a counter-stroke from the Logrus of Chaos. Likewise, the Logrus seeks to destroy Corwin's Pattern, since it represents an additional artifact of Order against Chaos (although not in accord with the Order of Amber's Pattern) — but equally cannot do so without the risk of a counter-stroke from Amber's Pattern. It is suggested Corwin's Pattern may end up forming a third "pole" in the struggle between Order and Chaos, ultimately taking neither side and able to retain its independent existence against anything short of what will never happen, namely a combined assault from the Amber Pattern and Logrus.

== Reception ==
Jane M. Lindskold called Corwin of Amber one of Zelazny's several "poet protagonists", noting that "Zelazny gives Corwin dimension beyond the usual sword-and-sorcery hero by giving us hints of what depths of feeling" he is capable of, often through Corwin's use of poetry and song.

Juan A. Prieto-Pablos notes that Corwin, like most of Zelazny's heroes, is a privileged, immortal superhero on a mission to redeem himself from a past mistake.

== Corwin of Amber in popular culture ==
In the game NetHack, Grayswandir appears as a powerful artifact silver saber that protects its wielder from hallucination.

In Warcraft: Orcs and Humans, typing in "Corwin of Amber" activates the game's cheat codes. The summoning of non-human armies from another dimension to lay siege in the case of The Horde in the Warcraft series also closely mirror the events in the climax of Nine Princes in Amber.

In Lost Souls, the magical sword Grayswandir appears as a rare artifact longsword that destroys items of chaos on contact.
