= Prince of Chaos =

1991 novel by Roger Zelazny

- Author: Roger Zelazny
- Cover artist: Linda Burr
- Language: English
- Series: The Chronicles of Amber
- Genre: Fantasy
- Publisher: William Morrow and Company
- Publication date: November 1991
- Publication place: United States
- Media type: Print (Hardcover)
- Pages: 225
- ISBN: 0-688-08727-2
- OCLC: 23767657
- Dewey Decimal: 813/.54 20
- LC Class: PS3576.E43 P7 1991
- Preceded by: Knight of Shadows

Prince of Chaos is a fantasy novel by American writer Roger Zelazny, the final book in The Chronicles of Amber series.

== Plot summary ==
Merlin is summoned back to the Courts of Chaos, where he was raised. There, he becomes involved in political intrigues and discovers that he is closer to the throne than he had anticipated or wanted. He encounters several old acquaintances and must use both his intelligence and magical abilities to navigate various traps, assist his friends, and investigate the fate of his father.

== Reception ==
Kirkus Reviews called the novel "Glum, talky, and threadbare." Publishers Weekly wrote that it "still fails to capture the spirit that rendered the five original Amber novels so enjoyable." John R. Alden of The Philadelphia Inquirer called the novel the "kind of book that gives fantasy a bad name" and wrote that the writing "is the literary equivalent of a magician's chatter."
