= Nine Princes in Amber =

Fantasy novel by American writer Roger Zelazny

- Dust-jacket illustration from the first edition.
- Author: Roger Zelazny
- Cover artist: Amelia S. Edwards
- Language: English
- Series: The Chronicles of Amber
- Genre: Fantasy
- Publisher: Doubleday
- Publication date: June 1970
- Publication place: United States
- Media type: Print (hardcover)
- Pages: 175
- ISBN: 978-0-380-01430-9
- OCLC: 88150
- Followed by: The Guns of Avalon

Nine Princes in Amber is a fantasy novel by American writer Roger Zelazny, the first in the Chronicles of Amber series. It was first published in 1970, and it later spawned a computer game with the same name. The first (Doubleday hardcover) edition of the novel is unusually rare; the publisher pulped a significant part of the original print run in error when an order was issued to destroy the remaining copies of Zelazny's older book Creatures of Light and Darkness.

In the story, Carl Corey wakes up in a secluded New York hospital with amnesia. He escapes and investigates, discovering the truth, piece by piece: he is actually Prince Corwin of Amber, the one true world, of which the Earth is merely a shadow. He is one of nine men who might rule Amber, if he can fight his way past the armies of his older brother Eric.

== Plot ==
Corwin wakes up from a coma in a hospital in New York with amnesia. He soon discovers that he is part of a superhuman royal family who can wander among infinite parallel worlds (called "shadows"), and who rule over the one true world, Amber. He meets members of this newly rediscovered family, and then later is shown and walks in the Pattern, a labyrinth inscribed in the dungeons of Castle Amber which gives the multiverse its order. Walking in the Pattern of Rebma (a city in Shadow that mirrors the true city of Amber, down to the smallest detail, including the pattern) restores Corwin's memory and his abilities to travel through shadows. In alliance with his brother Bleys, he attempts to conquer Amber, which is ruled by his elder brother Eric. Eric took power after the disappearance of their father, Oberon. Their attempt fails. Bleys falls from the side of the Kolvir mountain, and Corwin is captured, blinded, and imprisoned. Thanks to his genetic regenerative ability, his eyes regrow, and he regains his vision. Dworkin Barimen, the mad sorcerer who created the pattern, enters Corwin's prison through the walls of Corwin's prison cell, and eventually draws on the wall the door through which Corwin escapes.

== Characters ==
The Machiavellian royal family of Amber is headed by Oberon, the former king, now absent. His five daughters are Florimel, Deirdre, Fiona, Llewella, and Coral (who doesn't come into play until the ninth novel), but the major players in the novel are the nine princes of the title:

- Benedict: The oldest surviving prince, uninvolved in the current struggle for the crown, he is the master tactician of the family and a man who seldom smiles. He is presumed to be dead by the rest of the family.
- Corwin: The protagonist. A cross between a cruel rogue and a reluctant poet, his years on Earth seem to have softened him somewhat: "And remember who it was who gave you your life where another would have taken it".
- Eric: The arrogant yet competent would-be king of Amber; he commands the loyalty of Julian, Caine and Gérard.
- Caine: Calculating and realistic.
- Bleys: Dashing and charming; Corwin's other ally in his fight against Eric.
- Brand: Like Oberon, mysteriously unavailable.
- Julian: A sinister hunter.
- Gérard: Physically strongest of the nine, affable and liked even by his enemies.
- Random: A sneaky rascal, though Corwin's ally. A gambler and the youngest of Oberon's children.

== Adaptations ==
A three-part comic book adaptation was published by DC Comics in 1996. It was produced by Byron Preiss Visual Publications, written by Terry Bisson, and illustrated by Lou Harrison (issue #1), Bryn Barnard (issue #2), and Tom Roberts (issue #3)—with an introduction by Zelazny.

A film adaptation was first planned in 1998, with Mark Canton and Akiva Goldsman producing, and Ed Neumeier adapting. In 2016, the creators of the Walking Dead television series announced that they were producing a television adaptation of The Chronicles of Amber; in 2023, it was announced that Stephen Colbert would be an executive producer, via his Spartina Productions company.
