= List of The Chronicles of Amber characters =

The Chronicles of Amber is a fantasy series written by Roger Zelazny chiefly in ten books published from 1970 to 1991. It features a great variety of characters from a myriad parallel universes (including "our" Earth universe). All universes spiral out on a continuum, which are more closely related to one end, Amber (and its history and functions), or slides on a scale closer and closer to Amber's opposite, the Courts of Chaos, at the other.

== Amberites ==
Characters from Amber are referred to as Amberites.

=== The Amber royal family ===
Much information about the royal family is compiled only in the authorized companion book Roger Zelazny's Visual Guide to Castle Amber. Some personal colors and offspring are identified only there.

The founder of the family is Dworkin Barimen, who first appears as a mad sorcerer. He is the creator of the Primal Pattern and father of Oberon. The surname Barimen is an anagram of "in Amber" and may or may not have been intended as the name of a House of Chaos; it is similar to the name "Shambarimen", the maker of a major artifact in Philip José Farmer's World of Tiers series, and is likely a voluntary tip of the hat to him. Computer programmer Felix Croes uses "Dworkin" as a pseudonym, referring to Dworkin Barimen, and named his MUD software platform Dworkin's Game Driver.

Dworkin was born into House Barimen, a noble family in the Courts of Chaos. His usual appearance was that of a dwarf, although like many Lords of Chaos, he was able to change his shape.

Early in Amber's history, Dworkin served in the court of his son, King Oberon, as an advisor and teacher of magical skills, including the power of creating Trumps. He was frequently absent from Amber, in places unknown. His students included many or most of Oberon's children, including Bleys, Brand, and Fiona, who received advanced instruction.

After obtaining the Left Eye of the Serpent of Chaos (which would later be known as the Jewel of Judgment) through methods unknown, he fled into Shadow and met the Unicorn of Order. With her help and using the Eye, he inscribed the Primal Pattern, giving form to Amber. Prior to the beginning of The Chronicles of Amber, Dworkin went mad, apparently because of damage to the Primal Pattern, which was linked to and reflected in his own mind.

Dworkin’s children and grandchildren are:

- Oberon, liege lord of Amber and only known child of Dworkin. His children are:
- by Cymnea:
  - Benedict (orange, yellow, brown), The master tactician of the family as well as the unmatched master of all martial weapons, and a man who seldom smiles. He chose to remove himself from the struggle for the crown, leaving Eric and Corwin as the eldest surviving heirs. Moreover, Oberon declared his marriage with Cymnea null and void, rendering all his children by her retroactively illegitimate. Benedict has had an affair with Lintra the Hellmaid of Chaos, during a brief interlude in hostilities between them, and is unaware that she bore a child as a result of this. Benedict and Lintra subsequently came to blows again, and Benedict slew Lintra but lost his arm. He still fights better with one arm than anybody else with two.
    - Dara, great-granddaughter of Benedict after his affair with Lintra. Because of the differing speed of time-flow in different Shadows and between Amber and Chaos, she is first met as a fairly young woman: But within only a couple of weeks of Amber time, she has grown considerably older and embittered in Chaos, to herself be a mother of at least three fully adult children.
  - Osric (silver & red) and Finndo (green & gold), long-dead brothers of whom we learn little. It is suggested that they conspired to take the throne from their father, after which they were sent to the front lines of a war from which they did not return.
- by Faiella:
  - Eric (black, red & silver), Corwin's elder full-brother (illegitimate because Oberon & Faiella were not married at the time of his birth). An arrogant yet competent would-be king of Amber; he commands the loyalty of Julian, Caine, and Gérard. Corwin and Eric's rivalry for the throne drives much of the plot of the first two books. After Benedict, Eric was reputedly the greatest swordsman in the Universe of Amber and Shadow. A few centuries before the events of the first novels, he and Corwin decided to settle their rivalry in a duel to the death. In the event, Eric, fearing Oberon's wrath, left Corwin, gravely injured, on Earth in the 17th century. Corwin recovered physically but his memory was gone. Eric maintained that Corwin had left Amber of his own volition, but Oberon would often hint that he suspected Eric of killing Corwin. When Oberon disappeared, he was lured into Shadow in order to find a tool to fix the Pattern after Brand damaged it. Eric soon allied with Caine and Julian to hold the throne.
  - Corwin of Amber (silver & black), the narrator of the first five books. He is the first legitimate living child of Oberon who desires the throne. His years on Earth seem to have softened him somewhat from his earlier arrogant beliefs, particularly with respect to the rest of the family, and to the residents of Shadow, who are regarded by some in the family as creations of their own minds, to be used and abused as they see fit. He also improved his political skills and his swordsmanship to the point where he fights Eric to a draw in Nine Princes in Amber.
    - Merlin of Amber (purple and grey), son of Corwin and Dara following a brief mid-afternoon fling. The narrator of the second set of five books. He was raised in the Courts of Chaos, and Corwin is unaware of his son's existence until he is informed by Dara late in the series. Adopting Earth, home to Flora and to his father, as his own home, he becomes a software developer in San Francisco. He finds himself subject to attempts on his life, which turn out to be instigated by his friend Luke, who is really Brand's son Rinaldo. He also has two younger half-brothers, Despil and Jurt, on his mother's side (from her second husband, Lord Gramble Sawall of Chaos), and an older step-halfbrother, Mandor, from Gramble's own prior marriage.
  - Deirdre (silver & black), Corwin's sister. Corwin's feelings for Deirdre are decidedly un-brotherly, and she appears to return his affection. She is a minor character in the Corwin cycle, but the Visual Guide to Amber says that she was the best-loved of the royals, due to her beauty and compassion. She dresses in black plate armor and used an axe in battle. Her mother was Faiella, who died while bearing Deirdre.
- by Clarissa, known as "the redheads":
  - Fiona (green, lavender, purple), a deft mind and great poise. Sorceress of the family. With Bleys, she was one of the original co-conspirators with Brand to unseat Oberon and take the throne. Corwin initially does not like her, but they become closer during the events of the series. Later she befriends her nephew Merlin and helps him solve his own mysteries.
  - Bleys (red & orange), a dashing and charming extrovert who partners with Corwin in the effort to retake Amber from Eric. He is also a sorcerer, though of lesser skill than his two full siblings, and favors the sword.
  - Brand (green), a manic depressive, megalomaniac sorcerer. He makes Faustian bargains with the forces of Chaos in order to gain power, apparently becoming a "living Trump" who can move anywhere in Shadow by willing it. By the time of the final conflict at the Courts of Chaos, he is no longer quite human, even by Amberite standards, and is quite insane.
    - Rinaldo, also known as Luke, son of Brand and Jasra. He and Merlin both studied at Berkeley and then worked with a computer company Grand Design. Luke does not tell much about himself, but shows he is strong, intelligent and has a salesman's ability to convince people and make them do things he wants. Luke plots revenge against the Royal Family, especially Merlin and Caine, for his father's death. After Caine's death, he is persuaded to give up the vendetta. He appears to prefer his own chosen alias of Luke to his given name of Rinaldo, even to people who know his birth name.
- by Lady Moins of Rebma:
  - Llewella (green, lavender, gray), was born of an affair Oberon had with Moins. She is older than Brand and younger than Bleys. Technically illegitimate, she was legally adopted to spite Clarissa after their final divorce. Llewella removed herself from the presence of her family, and lives in Rebma, an underwater city that is a reflection of Amber. Hers is something of a sad existence. She stands with her half-siblings in the final confrontation at the Courts of Chaos.
- by Harla:
  - None known
- by Rilga:
  - Caine (black & green), a calculating, realistic manipulator with naval talents and lifestyle. He and Gérard command both the Amber Navy and the merchant fleets which ply a thousand different Shadow oceans in their trade. Caine seemed to give Corwin the sea passage to Amber on his first assault, but then ambushed him with help from Eric, who was controlling the weather. After Eric's death and Corwin's assumption of power, Caine faked his own death in order to "go underground" in finding the author of the threat to Amber among the Royal Family. He arranged for Corwin to discover his "body", actually that of one of his shadows, and later stabbed Corwin after it appeared to him that Corwin, by bringing back Brand, was attempting to revive the plot against Oberon. Caine reappeared in the final battle at the Courts of Chaos, his silver arrows killing Brand. In the second set of novels, he himself is killed by Luke/Rinaldo as revenge for Brand's death. This results in Julian and Gérard declaring a vendetta against Luke.
  - Julian (white & black), a cold, sinister hunter with a calm manner and biting tongue. He is usually found guarding the Forest of Arden in Amber, with his hell-hounds – beasts out of Shadow who are quite capable of ripping bodies, and metal, with their teeth. He has incestuous feelings for Fiona. Eventually he admits to Corwin that he recommended that Corwin be blinded in captivity, to render him useless to Brand's cabal (and thus in a way saving his life). With Eric and Caine, Julian formed the counter-cabal to hold the throne.
  - Gérard (blue & gray), a trusted brother, the strongest man in the multiverse and called "the best of all of us" by Brand. His loyalty is not, however, backed up with intelligence. He resents being manipulated by his siblings, preferring the face-to-face confrontation and the contest of strength, not of guile. When the family contacts Brand in his shadow prison, Gérard is the first to grab an axe, teleport into Brand's cell, and free him. Later he loyally guards Brand after he is mysteriously stabbed after returning to Amber.
- by Dybele
  - Florimel (green & gray), known as Flora, is regarded as shallow or a dumb blonde by her siblings, yet she often is on the winning side. Her beauty is legendary in many Shadows and also in Amber itself. She was placed on Earth to keep an eye on Corwin while he was in the hospital. She likes nothing better than to live a pampered existence in her luxurious house in Westchester, New York and entertain her many lovers. Her solution to not using her powers on Earth is to always have a hand grenade on her person.
- by Kinta, introduced in the Merlin Cycle:
  - Coral, a princess from a nearby shadow called Begma, a result of Oberon's secret short liaison with the wife of a Begman diplomat. Although Coral is Merlin's willing lover, she is actually married to Rinaldo as part of a treaty between royal families. Coral is half-sister to Nayda.
- by Paulette
  - Random (orange, red, brown), a sneaky rascal, often irritating and called a 'punk' by his older siblings. Random helps Corwin regain his memory, and supports Corwin in his quest for the throne of Amber. After the final battle at the Courts of Chaos, the Unicorn chooses Random himself to succeed Oberon. Random's passions before this were gliding and drumming. It was after a "hot set" in his favorite Shadow that Brand contacted him through a card in a hand of poker he was playing, setting into motion the events that led him to contact Corwin at Flora's house in Westchester, New York.
    - Martin, son of Random by Moire's daughter Morganthe. After walking the Pattern in Rebma, he wandered in Shadow until he encountered Benedict, who became a mentor. Brand later created a Trump for Martin, using it to summon him to the Primal Pattern, where he stabbed Martin, using the blood he shed to damage the Primal Pattern and allow the forces of Chaos to threaten Amber.
  - Mirelle (red & yellow)
- by Lora, introduced in the Merlin Cycle – or possibly by Harla (see above):
  - Delwin (brown & black) and Sand (pale tan & dark brown), twin brother and sister. They only lived a short time in Amber, preferring to live in the Shadow worlds and keep themselves removed from the affairs of their siblings. In the novel Blood of Amber, Merlin names Harla as the mother of Delwin and Sand and further states that Oberon was married to Harla while still married to Rilga, making this a bigamous marriage and calling the legitimacy of Delwin and Sand into question. It is known that neither has any interest in dynastic struggles.
- by Deela, an enemy of Amber, introduced in the Merlin Cycle:
  - Dalt (black & green), Oberon's illegitimate son, a mercenary who possesses a keen hatred of Amber – his symbol is a lion rending a unicorn. He was conceived while Deela was Oberon's prisoner. Or so he claims, probably having been told by his mother that Deela was raped. That may well be true, or it may be that she seduced Oberon as a way of working her way out of imprisonment and lied about it afterwards, when hostilities between Amber and Chaos resumed. He is known to hang around the kingdom of Kashfa although he is outlawed there, and was Luke's childhood friend. Dalt is very strong, and recovered from being impaled on a sword by Benedict.

The names of Florimel's and Random's mothers are not given in the novels; the names here are taken from the Visual Guide to Amber and the Complete Amber Sourcebook. The Visual Guide adds a younger daughter of Paulette, Mirelle, but she does not appear in any of the novels.

Caine's parentage varies from book to book: Corwin places him above Bleys in the succession and Random also alludes to this but Merlin says he is a full brother of Julian and Gérard. Both statements could be true if Caine is, in fact, older than any of Clarissa's children, and the result of an illegitimate affair with Rilga but legally adopted into the line before Clarissa's children, just as Llewella was born illegitimate but legally adopted. Although Oberon did not actually marry Rilga till after finally divorcing Clarissa after the birth of Brand. The Visual Guide to Amber and the Complete Amber Sourcebook, though both are authorised works, contradict each other. Corwin also ignores his sisters in the succession.

It is also mentioned that, although Llewella definitely (and possibly Caine, as mentioned above) was legally adopted into the family after being born illegitimate, this did not happen to Eric, because Oberon needed to remain on good terms with Cymnea's family, and Eric was perpetually bitter about this.

In Nine Princes in Amber Corwin mentions his fondness for Random as related to being full brothers instead of half-brothers. However, he is still suffering from brain damage at the time. Given that only two books later, it is Corwin himself who mentions that his mother Faiella died giving birth to Deirdre, and Random was only born much later after many more children to other women, this can be put down to either an official authorial change and retcon (in book 3), or to Corwin's still-damaged memory (in book 1).

In the Merlin Cycle, a Pattern-created ghost of Oberon claims that there were a total of 47 children, though only 20 are mentioned in the books. Corwin reliably states (while walking the pattern) there were once 15 brothers and 8 sisters, going on to say 6 brothers are dead as are 2 sisters (or possibly 4). Having no knowledge of Dalt at the time, this makes a total of 24 known children of Oberon, of which only 21 are ever named. One daughter and 3 sons are never named in any of the books or accompanying materials.

=== Other Amberites ===
- Lord Rein, a minstrel who was once knighted by Corwin
- Roger, a guard in Castle Amber, and amateur author. Likely this is Zelazny writing himself into his novel. Corwin describes Roger as lean, cadaverous, pipe-smoking, and grinning, a description that would fit the author. Roger says that he is writing a "philosophical romance shot through with elements of horror and morbidity", and that he composes the "horror" portions while on duty in the dungeon.
- Droppa MaPantz, the court jester in the Merlin Cycle. From time to time King Random takes him to Las Vegas to gather new material. Merlin and Corwin's friend Bill from Earth recognizes some of his jokes as being taken from George Carlin's act.
- Bloody Bill, Bloody Andy, Bloody Eddie, restaurateurs in Amber. They successively run the same establishment with a reputation for good food and random violence. The restaurant is traditionally known by the name of the previous, deceased, owner, be it Bill, Andy etc - apparently while Bill was alive, it was known as "Bloody Sam's". Proper table manners at "Bloody Bill's", under the proprietorship of Andy (later it became "Bloody Andy's") include making sure your sword is partly unsheathed and visible to all. The Fish Fry is to-die-for (literally).
- Vinta Bayle, Caine's mistress and daughter to Baron Bayle, Amber's vintner. For a time she is possessed by the ty'iga spirit which Dara has set to watch over Merlin. The ty'iga likes to seduce Merlin when in human form.
- Jopin, keeper of the lighthouse at Cabra and a former sea captain who enjoys the simplicity and solitude of his job.

== The Courts of Chaos ==
Perhaps fittingly, in all but the last novel there isn't a specific name for characters from the Courts of Chaos. Both Chaosites and Chaosians are popular choices by fans, through the first series, they are referred to only as "the Courts", or as "the forces of Chaos". In the final book, those of the Courts of Chaos are referred to as Chaosites by Merlin.

- Borel, a duke and master of arms of house Hendrake. Dara's fencing instructor.
- Dara, great-granddaughter of Benedict, Corwin's lover, mother of Merlin of Amber, and wife of the Chaos nobleman Gramble Sawall
- Gilva, a warrior-maiden of house Hendrake.
- Gramble Sawall, Dara's husband, an ally of King Swayvill.
- Jurt and Despil, Merlin's half brothers – sons of Dara (Merlin's mother) and Gramble Sawall. Jurt hates Merlin, while Despil tries to avoid conflicts.
- Merlin of Amber, son of Dara and Corwin, great-great-grandson of Benedict, and narrator of the second cycle of books.
- Mandor, Merlin's stepbrother, a son of Gramble Sawall from a previous marriage. He is a machiavellian manipulator, but Merlin likes him. His name may be derived from the Latin mandare, and is an anagram of "Random".
- Suhuy (called Uncle Suhuy by Merlin), keeper of the Logrus and friendly adversary of Dworkin.
- Swayvill, King of Chaos during the Merlin Cycle.

== Shadow dwellers ==
- Ganelon, an exile from Avalon, killed and impersonated by Oberon. Based on the character of the same name from The Song of Roland.
- Ghostwheel, a sentient computer created by Merlin of Amber, capable of generating Trump connections at a rate of thousands per second, apparently regarded by the Pattern and Logrus as a minor upstart in the ranks of cosmic powers.
- Hugi, a fatalist talking raven. Based on Hugin, one of the two ravens who perched on Odin's shoulders in Norse mythology.
- Jasra, a powerful sorceress, mother of Luke, tutor of Julia, former handmaid to Dara and deposed ruler of the Keep of Four Worlds. She has venomous lips and a thirst for power.
- Julia Barnes, Merlin's ex-girlfriend, whom he finds murdered in her San Francisco apartment by a doglike monster from another world. This is later revealed to be a deception; Julia is alive under the alias of Mask and has become a sorceress, taking over the Keep of Four Worlds from Jasra. Merlin had taken her with him on a shadow walk, which led to their breakup and to her pursuing an interest in occult magic.
- Lancelot, one of Ganelon's knights who was rescued by Corwin. Based on Sir Lancelot from Arthurian legend.
- Lorraine, a camp follower with second sight in a shadow of the same name.
- Victor Melman, occultist from Earth, associate and possible teacher of Julia Barnes, student of Jasra. Killed by Merlin using primal chaos.
- Moire, queen of Rebma, maternal grandmother of Random's son Martin through her daughter Morganthe, who committed suicide after being abandoned by Random.
- Rhanda, a vampire-like being called a shroudling. She and Merlin were childhood playmates.
- Bill Roth, a lawyer from Earth, who aids Corwin and ends up being something of a confidant for Merlin, as well as legal counsel to the court of Amber. In Sign of the Unicorn, Bill, frustrated by Corwin's evasiveness, complains: "I've a peculiar feeling that I may never see you again. It is as if I were one of those minor characters in a melodrama who gets shuffled offstage without ever learning how things turn out".
- Sharu Garrul, Jasra's former tutor and a previous ruler of the Keep of the Four Worlds.
- The Sphinx, a monster that devours those who cannot answer its riddles. Based on the riddling Sphinx of Thebes in the Greek myth of Oedipus.
- The Ty'iga, a bodyless demon who inhabits the bodies of others. She is female, or at least feminine, though she is able to possess male bodies as well. When she leaves one's body the possessed person feels like waking up from a sleep and has no memory of the intervening time. She appears as Dan Martinez, George Hansen, Meg Devlin, Vinta Bayle and she was also Gail Lampron, a former girlfriend of Luke. She is finally bound in the body of Nayda, Coral's sister, since Nayda actually died from an illness just as she was possessed. She was originally set to watch and protect Merlin by his mother Dara, unless she caught sight of the Jewel.
- Vialle, a blind noblewoman from Rebma whom Random is forced to marry. This was intended as a punishment for Random's affair with Moire's late daughter. Random would be bound to stay in Rebma for a year, and Vialle would gain status as a noble of Amber. To everyone's surprise, the marriage worked out well. She is artistic, creating sculptures by touch, specializing in busts of the Amberites. Vialle gives Luke/Rinaldo her protection in the form of her ring, ensuring that the vendetta against him by Caine's supporters will not be allowed to proceed.
- Ygg, a talking tree planted by Oberon to mark the border between Order and Chaos. It is based on Yggdrasil, the tree that holds up the sky in northern Germanic and Icelandic myths.

== The Powers ==
The two main beings who control and create the Amber multiverse are The Pattern and The Logrus, who are immensely competitive and often cause collateral damage and casualties in the course of their struggles against each other:

- The Pattern, sentient embodiment of Order. It is capable of manifesting as a unicorn, which according to Dworkin is the mother of Oberon, and of creating pattern-ghosts of any who have walked its path. In the Merlin cycle, the Pattern's spirit is implied to be older than the Primal Pattern, since it refers to events in its competition with the Logrus that predate Dworkin's creation of that Pattern. It appears to wish to impose unending, unmoving, static pure order over the universe.
- The Logrus, embodiment of Chaos, also sentient and capable of manifesting as a giant serpent, and of creating semi-solid projections similar to pattern-ghosts. It claims that the Jewel of Judgement was its eye, stolen by the Unicorn; it appears to desire to return all existence to the primal chaos from which it came.
- Corwin's Pattern, created by Corwin in The Courts of Chaos, it is also sentient and attempts to remain neutral in the conflict between the higher powers. It is also able to produce pattern-ghosts, and allies itself with Merlin, who along with Corwin is the only other being to walk its path.
- The Ghostwheel, a computer-based, pattern-manipulating artificial intelligence created by Merlin in a secret location in the shadows, near Chaos. Like the trump cards, it is able to transport objects between shadow worlds, and to view goings-on in remote locations. It is not a cosmic power like the patterns, but is able to act in defiance of them. The Ghostwheel is loyal to Merlin, and refers to him as "dad".
- The Unicorn, a mysterious figure who only appears rarely, in the shape of a unicorn, at crucial points in some of the Amber stories. It always arrives to act as a protector of the family of Dworkin, but never speaks, and its image was adopted as an emblem of the realm of Amber. Dworkin reports that it provided him with the Jewel of Judgement, formerly one of the eyes of the snake apparition of the Logrus, so the Unicorn must have been (and perhaps still is) an inhabitant or denizen of the Courts of Chaos (many of whom can shape-shift) before Dworkin created the Primal Pattern. It also is reputed to have mated with Dworkin to produce his child, Oberon, and so is apparently the family's grandmother.
