= Amberzine =

- Issue #1 cover
- Publisher: Phage Press
- First issue: March 1992; 33 years ago
- Final issue: 2005; 21 years ago
- Language: English
- OCLC: 972162233

Amberzine is a magazine that was published by Phage Press that covered The Chronicles of Amber books, the Amber Diceless Roleplaying Game, and associated material.

== Publication history ==
Phage Press released Amberzine #1 (March 1992) shortly after they published Amber Diceless Roleplaying Game. The digest-sized magazine presented material to inspire role-playing, such as character diaries and detailing elements of the setting. One to three issues per year were published from 1992 to 1997 and the magazine even included an original Roger Zelazny short story, "The Salesman's Tale," in Amberzine #6 (February 1994). Matt Howarth wrote and illustrated a Bugtown/Amber comic crossover titled "Amber Raves of Pain," which was published in installments from Amberzine #6 (February 1994) through #9 (January 1997). Erick Wujcik kept Amberzine in production until 1997, when he moved into computer games, and then published Amberzine #11 (2003) years later; after he decided not to be a publisher anymore, Phage finished with a final quadruple-sized Amberzine #12–15 (2005) to complete its obligation to subscribers and by publishing the remaining material that Wujcik had left.

== Reception ==
Steve Crow reviewed Amberzine in White Wolf #38 (1993), rating it a 3 out of 5 and stated that "Overall, I've given Amberzine a three rating. For Amber players, however, I'd give it a 4.5 for useful background information, information on how to run an Amber campaign, etc. For non-Amber players, I'd give it a 1.5 as a little bit of its material can be extracted for other roleplaying games, and the Campaign Logs to provide hints on character development."

In the September 1992 edition of Dragon (Issue #185), Rick Swan reviewed the premiere issue of Amberzine and commented, "As is the case with most fan publications, the writing and graphics range from adequate to amateur, but what the magazine lacks in slickness it more than makes up for in enthusiasm."

Two years later, in the September 1994 edition of Dragon (Issue #209), Lester Smith called the magazine "an entertaining read, and a great source of ideas of Amber campaigns."

Three issues later, in the December 1994 edition of Dragon (Issue #212), although Allen Varney singled out Issue #5 of Amberzine for reprinting The Dark World by Henry Kuttner and C.L. Moore, he pointed out that the magazine "has become almost entirely game-free... and now serves more as a good but pricey general 'zine for Amber fans."
