= Knight of Shadows =

1989 novel by Roger Zelazny

- Author: Roger Zelazny
- Cover artist: Linda Burr
- Language: English
- Series: The Chronicles of Amber
- Genre: Fantasy
- Publisher: William Morrow and Company
- Publication date: November 1989
- Publication place: United States
- Media type: Print (hardcover)
- Pages: 215 pp
- ISBN: 0-688-08726-4
- OCLC: 19845743
- Dewey Decimal: 813/.54 20
- LC Class: PS3576.E43 K6 1989
- Preceded by: Sign of Chaos
- Followed by: Prince of Chaos

Knight of Shadows is a fantasy novel by American writer Roger Zelazny, published in November 1989. It is the ninth book in the Chronicles of Amber series.

Merlin continues attempting to solve several mysteries in his life: why Julia turned against him, how she became involved with Jurt, and who is raging against him.

After being trapped in a strange world peopled with ghosts induced by the Pattern, Merlin discovers that he is involved in a superpower quarrel between the Pattern of Amber and the Logrus of Chaos.

== Reception ==
Kirkus Reviews called the novel a "mega-yarn so hypercomplicated that Zelazny spends the first 50 pages here explaining--not always convincingly--who's been doing what to whom, and why." Publishers Weekly wrote that "Readers who enjoyed the poetic writing, skilled plotting and crafted characterizations of the original Amber books will be disappointed again." Drew Bittner of the Asbury Park Press wrote: "With his customary excellent imagery and strong characterization, especially the running dialogue between Merlin and his magical strangling cord, Zelazny's newest work is a worthy addition to the Amber series, adding a few more clues to the mysteries of Amber."
