= The Guns of Avalon =

1972 novel by Roger Zelazny

- Dust-jacket illustration from the first edition
- Author: Roger Zelazny
- Cover artist: Emanuel Schongut
- Language: English
- Series: The Chronicles of Amber
- Genre: Fantasy
- Publisher: Doubleday
- Publication date: 1972
- Publication place: United States
- Media type: Print (hardcover)
- Pages: 180
- ISBN: 0-385-08506-0
- OCLC: 495348
- Dewey Decimal: 813/.5/4
- LC Class: PZ4.Z456 Gu PS3576.E43
- Preceded by: Nine Princes in Amber
- Followed by: Sign of the Unicorn

The Guns of Avalon is fantasy novel by American writer Roger Zelazny, the second book in the Chronicles of Amber series. The book continues directly from the previous novel, Nine Princes in Amber, although it includes a recapitulation.

== Plot summary ==
Corwin has escaped the dungeons of Amber, where he was imprisoned by his hated brother Eric, who had seized the throne of Amber. All of Corwin's siblings believe that guns cannot function in Amber, since gunpowder is inert there. However, Corwin has secret knowledge: in the shadow world of Avalon, where he once ruled, there exists a jeweler's rouge that will function in Amber as gunpowder should. Corwin plans to raise a legion of shadow soldiers and arm them with automatic rifles from the shadow world Earth. While gathering these forces, Corwin discovers a more sinister problem growing among the shadows. He meets Dara, a woman claiming to be his great-grandniece, and later discovers a threat to Amber: a black road that runs across universes from the Courts of Chaos to Amber. With his newly trained army, Corwin marches to Castle Amber, only to find it already under siege. Eric is mortally wounded and passes the Jewel of Judgment to Corwin, thereby making Corwin Regent. The immediate danger passes, but Dara threatens greater danger after walking the Pattern and revealing herself to be a creature of the Courts of Chaos, intent on destroying both Amber and the Shadows.

== Reception ==
Avram Davidson gave the novel an indifferent review, complaining that he did not "feel for any of [its] characters the slightest empathy, sympathy, or even osteopathy". He concluded by saying "there is nothing outrageously bad in [this] book of magic, intrigue, and warfare, but very little that is very good". Reactor magazine reviewer Rajan Khanna, after rereading the novel, wrote that it "establishes the overarching plotline of" The Chronicles of Amber series.

== Deleted scene ==
Zelazny wrote a sex scene between Corwin and Dara that was explicit by American publishing standards in the 1970s. Zelazny was amused when the book's editor asked him to remove the scene, so that sales to libraries would not be jeopardized. The deleted scene has never been published with the novel, but it was printed for the first time in The Collected Stories of Roger Zelazny, Volume 3: This Mortal Mountain.

== Adaptation ==
A three-part comic book adaptation was produced by Byron Priess Visual Productions, written by Terry Bisson, and drawn by Christopher Schenck and Andrew Pepoy; it was published by DC Comics in 1996. This adaptation followed the three-part comics adaptation of Nine Princes in Amber, also written by Bisson and published by DC.
