= The Pattern and the Logrus =

In The Chronicles of Amber novels

In The Chronicles of Amber series of fantasy novels (1970s – 1990s), The Pattern is an inscribed labyrinth which gives the multiverse its order. It granted characters walking through it "the ability to access a multitude of compossible worlds". Related to it is the Logrus, a shifting, three-dimensional maze which represents the forces of Chaos in the multiverse.

== Amber Pattern ==
The Pattern is inscribed on the floor of a large cavern that is part of a system of caves deep within Mount Kolvir, directly underneath Castle Amber in the city of Amber. The Pattern is a single, intertwined curve, laid out in a spiderweb-like shape. Members of the Royal Family of Amber can walk along the Pattern to its center in order to gain the power to walk among shadows – alternate worlds. Whether members of the house of Amber create the shadows they walk into or that the shadows already exist and that the pattern walker merely enters them is a subject that the author Zelazny leaves open to reader interpretation. Once a walker sets foot upon the Pattern, he must continue following its labyrinthine course to the center; stopping for too long, or leaving the pathway of the Pattern, results in a terrible death.

Walking the Pattern is not an easy task. There is a resistance that slows the walker as if he is wearing lead boots that get heavier and heavier with every step. During the ordeal, the walker passes through several points of extreme difficulty called "veils" – The First Veil, the Second Veil, and the Final Veil. These points represent intense surges in this fierce resistance, but "breaking through" a Veil causes the resistance to let up a bit.

Once at the Pattern's center, the walker has acquired the power to walk in Shadow. As well, being at the center gives him the opportunity to command the Pattern to send him anywhere he wishes – across the room, back up to Amber Castle, across the world, to another Shadow world, here on Earth, etc.

In the Merlin Cycle, the second series of five novels in the Chronicles, the Pattern is shown to be sentient. It is able to manifest itself at any point in shadow, and teleport others without their consent. It is also able to create Pattern ghosts, echo versions of any person who has walked the Pattern.

== Primal Pattern ==
During the series, it is revealed that Amber itself is but the first "Shadow" of a Primal pattern, located when the Unicorn of Order led Corwin to a previously unseen location. The Primal Pattern was guarded by a purple Griffin named Wixer that apparently had also been placed there to guard Dworkin (previously thought deceased), as Dworkin had, at this point, lost much of his mental faculty. This Primal Pattern was damaged prior to the events of Nine Princes in Amber when Amberite blood was spilled on it – the blood of Martin, son of Random (Oberon's youngest acknowledged child), who was stabbed by Brand. Oberon attempted to repair the Pattern, although he realized the process would kill him. Brand, whom Dworkin acknowledged as his most apt pupil in the study of the Pattern, suggested that such repair may not be possible. Brand also suggested when Corwin was inscribing his own New Pattern that there could not be two such centers of order in the multiverse and that it would be necessary to destroy Corwin's New Pattern before Brand could inscribe his own. However, Oberon successfully repaired the Old Pattern, and it was seen to coexist peacefully with Corwin's New Pattern – possibly because both are reflections of the Pattern in the Jewel of Judgment.

It is implied that nobody could successfully repair the damaged Pattern perfectly, or reproduce it as it originally was – and that their own personality would be inevitably imprinted on it in the attempt. This is accepted – and desired – by Brand, who wished to destroy the Pattern outright and re-create a new Pattern in his own image, with himself as the architect of the new multiverse: A fact either not known, not believed, or misunderstood by Corwin, who attempts to faithfully recreate the Old Pattern (after Brand deceives him into believing Oberon to have failed in his attempt to repair the original) only for his New Pattern to not only evolve differently but also to eventually resist the attempts of the successfully-Repaired Pattern to incorporate it. It follows, from this (and from the fact of Corwin's successful creation of a New Pattern, in which he did not die) that it may not have been necessary for Oberon to die in repairing the Old Pattern. Since Oberon did indeed die, he may even have done so willingly (and known in advance that this was necessary) as a way to avoid imprinting his own personality on the Old Pattern at its restoration. At any rate, after its repair, the Old Pattern (when displaying sentience) does not appear to display any clear characteristics of Oberon's personality.

== Other Patterns ==
Through the course of the ten books, the existence of many other alternate Patterns is revealed. There is the Pattern in Rebma (Amber spelled backward), a reflected version of Amber beneath the sea; there is one in the ghost-city reflection of Amber in Tir-na Nog'th; there is the Primal Pattern, the one true Pattern that is higher on the reality scale than even Amber; Corwin's own Pattern, off in Shadow; and even imperfect versions of the Pattern found in Shadows very close to the true Pattern. The latter are called 'Broken Patterns' and can be walked by anyone with enough courage to do so.

Broken Patterns allow initiates to traverse shadow and perform magic in a similar way to the initiates of the true Patterns. However, the broken path manifests itself in a number of ways. The main example is that the break in the Pattern manifests itself in each Shadow the initiate visits. The size of the break depends on the size of the break in the Pattern and its distance in Shadow from Amber. Broken Pattern mages draw their power directly from the break, similar to drawing their power from Chaos. Each image of the Pattern degenerates the farther it is from Amber. The first nine broken images were negotiable, but Merlin in the course of Knight of Shadows, repaired one – presumably leaving only eight. It might be however that other patterns became safe enough to use after this.

== The Jewel of Judgment ==
The Jewel of Judgment is a large ruby-like gem worn as a pendant around the neck. As the saga progresses, its importance grows. At first, it is just a device for controlling the weather, useful in battle, but then Corwin is told that if he walks the Pattern carrying the Jewel, and then uses the power of the Pattern to project himself into it, he will gain a new level of power. When he does this, he finds that the Jewel itself contains a Pattern, in three or even more dimensions. Eventually, he learns from Dworkin that the Jewel is the real source of the Pattern of Amber and that it was obtained from the Unicorn. Corwin uses the Jewel to forge his own Pattern when he believes that Amber's Pattern has been destroyed. Standing at the center of his Pattern, he is then able to project himself into the final battle at the Courts of Chaos.

The Jewel of Judgment is revealed to be the left eye of the Serpent of Chaos, stolen by the Unicorn at some point in the very distant past. It eventually ends up serving as a replacement eye for Coral, allowing her to see the "clear, cold lines of eternity".

== The Logrus ==
In the Courts of Chaos exists the Logrus, a three-dimensional construct that is the opposite number to the Pattern of Amber. Where the unchanging, rigid Pattern represents Order, the Logrus is constantly altering its shape and represents the principle of Chaos.

The Logrus appears as a tentacular force that must be navigated on a magical / mental level. Those who navigate this construct successfully gain power over, and the ability to travel through, Shadow. An additional power gained from the successful navigation of the Logrus is the ability to "pull" desired, non-specific objects out of Shadow worlds.

Negotiating the Logrus is extremely difficult and potentially fatal. Prospective initiates of the Logrus generally receive advanced training, but success is dependent less on knowledge than on will. In addition to the danger of dying, some who have attempted the Logrus have experienced permanent cerebral damage, though this fate tends to happen only to those who are weak-willed or not of full chaosian blood. Luckily, those in one of the Chaos noble family bloodlines usually only end up being insane for a short period of time. Negotiating both the Logrus and the Pattern, as Merlin has, is a uniquely daring feat.

Just as Dworkin Barimen is the creator and keeper of the Primal Pattern, Suhuy is the creator and keeper of the Logrus. Both men were / are members of the noble houses of Chaos, although Dworkin was disowned for having created the Pattern. Dworkin and Suhuy apparently are / were friends; although they seem to be opponents during the later events of the novels, their ambiguous conversation overheard by Corwin hints that they could possibly be secretly collaborating.

== Reception and analysis ==
Naturally, the Pattern is recognized as a symbol of order in scholarly analysis, and as such has been described "as the antithesis and rival" of the Logrus, the sign of chaos in the novels. Some analysis has emphasized the crucial role that the psyche of the Pattern's creator, whether Dworkin in the case of the Pattern of Amber or Corwin in the case of his new Pattern, may be expected to play in the cosmos formed from it.

When it is revealed in the novels that the Pattern itself has its origins in Chaos, this may have been written as illustrating Edmund Husserl's arguments regarding the production of that which is considered objective from subjective phenomena.

Krzysztof M. Maj saw the Pattern as the "symbolical gate" linking our empirical world with the fantastic one of the novels, comparable in function to the wardrobe in The Chronicles of Narnia or the rabbit hole in Alice in Wonderland.

The Pattern has been analyzed in metaphorical counterpoint to the Trumps, where the Trumps represent "wild cards" blurring the distinction between perception and reality, but both are sources of empowerment for their users.

Olga Valikova praised the Pattern as an extraordinary instance where an architectonic image plays a central role in a literary work and compared it to the organizational principle of the novel Singing Stones by Kazakh writer Aslan Zhaksylykov.

Jane M. Lindskold proposed that the ability granted by the Pattern to its initiates, to "create new realities simply by imagining a place and then going to it", could be a metaphor "for Zelazny's thoughts on writing as a form of creation".

The Logrus has been called a source of "tactical nuclear weaponry, remote handling, and magical apportation". In one analysis, the Logrus has been construed as a rival metaphysical entity to the Unicorn of Amber, not the Pattern, with the climax of the Merlin Cycle a conflict between these forces.

== In popular culture ==
Computer programmer Felix "Dworkin" Croes, creator of the server software Dworkin's Game Driver or DGD, named the development MUD for his project The Pattern.

Esoterism scholar Kateryna Zorya remarked that the terms "Pattern" and "Logrus" from Zelazny's novels, like other influences from Western fantasy, have found their way into post-Soviet magical practice.

In Pro Perl, Peter Wainwright makes a punning reference to the Logrus and the Pattern in an example of regular expression usage. In the example, a search-and-replace operation is being executed. The text to search for is specified as a regular expression pattern. The sample text to replace the pattern with is logrus.
