= Symbiosis in fiction =

Plot device

Symbiosis (mutualism) appears in fiction, especially science fiction, as a plot device. It is distinguished from parasitism in fiction, a similar theme, by the mutual benefit to the organisms involved, whereas the parasite inflicts harm on its host. Early science fiction mostly depicted parasitic relationships, with symbiotic ones gaining prominence following World War II alongside the emergence of more positive depictions of aliens in general. The distinction between parasitism and symbiosis is not always clear-cut, and several works depict associations that start out parasitic and become symbiotic or vice versa, relationships with traits of both types, or one kind being mistaken for the other.

The most common type of symbiosis in science fiction is between humans and alien species, though there are also examples between humans and microbes, humans and plants, humans and artificial life forms, and between two or more non-human species. A common theme involves symbionts accessing the mind of their host; an analogous psychic counterpart without physical attachment also appears, especially in fantasy. In a more extensive variation, the psychic kind of symbiosis forms what is known as a gestalt or hive mind. On an even larger scale, some works depict entire planetary ecospheres in symbiosis—a concept related to the Gaia hypothesis, which posits that all life on Earth functions as a single organism.

== History ==
Speculative fictional portrayals of symbiosis evoke a tension between the wish-fulfilment of inbuilt companionship and healing, and the anxiety associated with invasiveness and erosion of the self.

— David Langford, The Greenwood Encyclopedia of Science Fiction and Fantasy, "Symbiosis" entry

Relationships between species in early science fiction were often imaginatively parasitic, with the parasites draining the vital energy of their human hosts and taking over their minds, as in Arthur Conan Doyle's 1895 The Parasite. After the Second World War, science fiction moved towards more mutualistic relationships, alongside the emergence of a more positive attitude to aliens in general. Some of these have been direct responses to earlier depictions of parasitism; Brian Stableford, in The Encyclopedia of Science Fiction, gives Ted White's 1970 novel By Furies Possessed as an example, writing that it is a rejoinder to Robert A. Heinlein's 1951 novel The Puppet Masters.

== Biological diversity ==
While most symbiosis in the real world is between relatively simple organisms, the most common science-fictional depiction involves humans in symbiosis with alien species; Stableford comments in The Science in Science Fiction that this is dubious as symbiosis typically results from coevolution. Nevertheless, some examples between different non-human species exist. In Olaf Stapledon's 1937 novel Star Maker, two different arthropod species enter into a lifelong symbiotic relationship after reaching sexual maturity; in Cixin Liu's 2010 novel Of Ants and Dinosaurs, the association begins with a cleaning symbiosis of ants eating pieces of meat stuck in the teeth of dinosaurs and over many generations evolves into cooperation for technological development. Three different alien species exist in a complex symbiosis in John Barnes 1988 novel Sin of Origin, while a symbiosis of a variety of aliens and a human makes up a spaceship in Robert Sheckley's 1953 short story "Specialist".

Another variation is humans in symbiosis with microscopic species, as with the real-world human microbiome and the mitochondria inside the cells of eukaryotic species including humans. In Greg Bear's 1985 novel Blood Music, the symbionts are modified white blood cells. In John Grant and David Langford's 2001 novel Guts: A Comedy of Manners, the human intestinal flora revolts. The midi-chlorians in the Star Wars franchise—intelligent microbes inside all living cells that communicate with The Force—were inspired by mitochondria, and have in turn lent their name to an endosymbiont—provisionally named Candidatus Midichloria mitochondrii—that lives inside the mitochondria in cells of the tick Ixodes ricinus.

Humans (or humanoid aliens) in symbiosis with plants also appear on occasion; examples include Eric Frank Russell's 1943 short story "Symbiotica" and Philip E. High's 1957 short story "The Meek Shall Inherit". Symbiosis with artificial creatures brought about through biotechnology such as genetic engineering appears in works like John Varley's 1974–1986 Eight Worlds series, where they serve as a kind of living space suit. Langford writes in The Greenwood Encyclopedia of Science Fiction and Fantasy that the relationship between witches and their familiars may also be viewed as a form of symbiosis.

== Overlap with parasitism ==
Symbiosis differs from parasitism in being mutually beneficial, whereas parasites derive benefits from the association at the expense of the host. This distinction is not always a sharp one, and in some works, apparently-parasitic relationships turn out to be symbiotic. In Walter M. Miller Jr.'s 1951 short story "Dark Benediction", a rapidly-spreading infection turns out to have beneficial health effects. The astrophysicist Elizabeth Stanway points to Brian Aldiss's 1962 novel Hothouse as a borderline case, inasmuch as the relationship with the fictional fungal species is involuntary on the part of the human hosts and they are unaware of it. In Dan Simmons's 1989 novel Hyperion, symbionts confer an ability to regenerate from death repeatedly at the cost of a successive loss of intelligence each time, thus granting a form of immortality that not everybody finds desirable.

Some associations begin as parasitic and become symbiotic, or vice versa. In Aldiss's 1982 novel Helliconia Spring, those who survive a deadly tick-borne disease derive symbiotic benefits from it in the form of adaptations to the periodically-changing climate of the planet Helliconia. In Seanan McGuire's 2013 novel Parasite (published under the pseudonym Mira Grant) and its sequels, tapeworms used for medical purposes in a symbiotic capacity develop more parasitic traits.

== Cognitive symbiosis ==
To the best of our understanding, for one organism to share the full sensory and memory perceptions of another would require a far more complex and invasive symbiosis than any observed in nature. Neural processing in humans is widely distributed, rather than all information passing through a single channel. Indeed, given our current understanding of the human nervous system, it would be impossible for a symbiont to intrude to the necessary extent without destroying the equilibrium necessary for life.

— Elizabeth Stanway, 2025

A common, albeit unrealistic, theme involves symbionts accessing the mind of their host. An early example is in Hal Clement's 1949 novel Needle, where an alien entity grants its human host improved mental functions and the two work together to find a rogue member of the same alien species. In Algis Budrys's 1956 short story "Silent Brother", the symbiont not only enhances mental faculties but enables regeneration. Other examples include the Trill in the Star Trek franchise and the Goa'uld in the Stargate franchise.

Besides biological symbiosis, an analogous psychic counterpart without physical attachment appears in several works, especially fantasy. In Clifford D. Simak's 1951 novel Time and Again and Bob Shaw's 1969 novel The Palace of Eternity, this kind of relationship is the origin of an equivalent of the soul. In Anne McCaffrey's 1968 novel Dragonflight and its sequels in the Dragonriders of Pern series, dragons and their riders share a mental link, while in Stableford's 1972 novel The Halcyon Drift and its sequels in the Hooded Swan series, a non-corporeal alien entity communicates telepathically with a spacefarer whose mind it has joined. In a more extensive variation, the psychic kind of symbiosis forms what is known as a gestalt or hive mind. One example is Theodore Sturgeon's 1953 novel More Than Human, where a group of humans with extraordinary psychic abilities join their minds together into a collective unit.

== Large-scale ==
Some works depict entire ecospheres in symbiosis. This is related to the Gaia hypothesis, which posits that all life on Earth functions as a single organism. In Simak's 1956 short story "Drop Dead", all life on a planet—a handful of species—are interconnected, and species introduced from offworld are successively and involuntarily incorporated into the symbiotic relationship. In the 2009 film Avatar, all native species on the fictional moon Pandora are connected to a vast biological neural network via tree roots in a manner inspired by real-world mycorrhizal networks.

== See also ==
- Evolution in fiction
- Genetics in fiction
