= Parasites in fiction =

Science in fiction

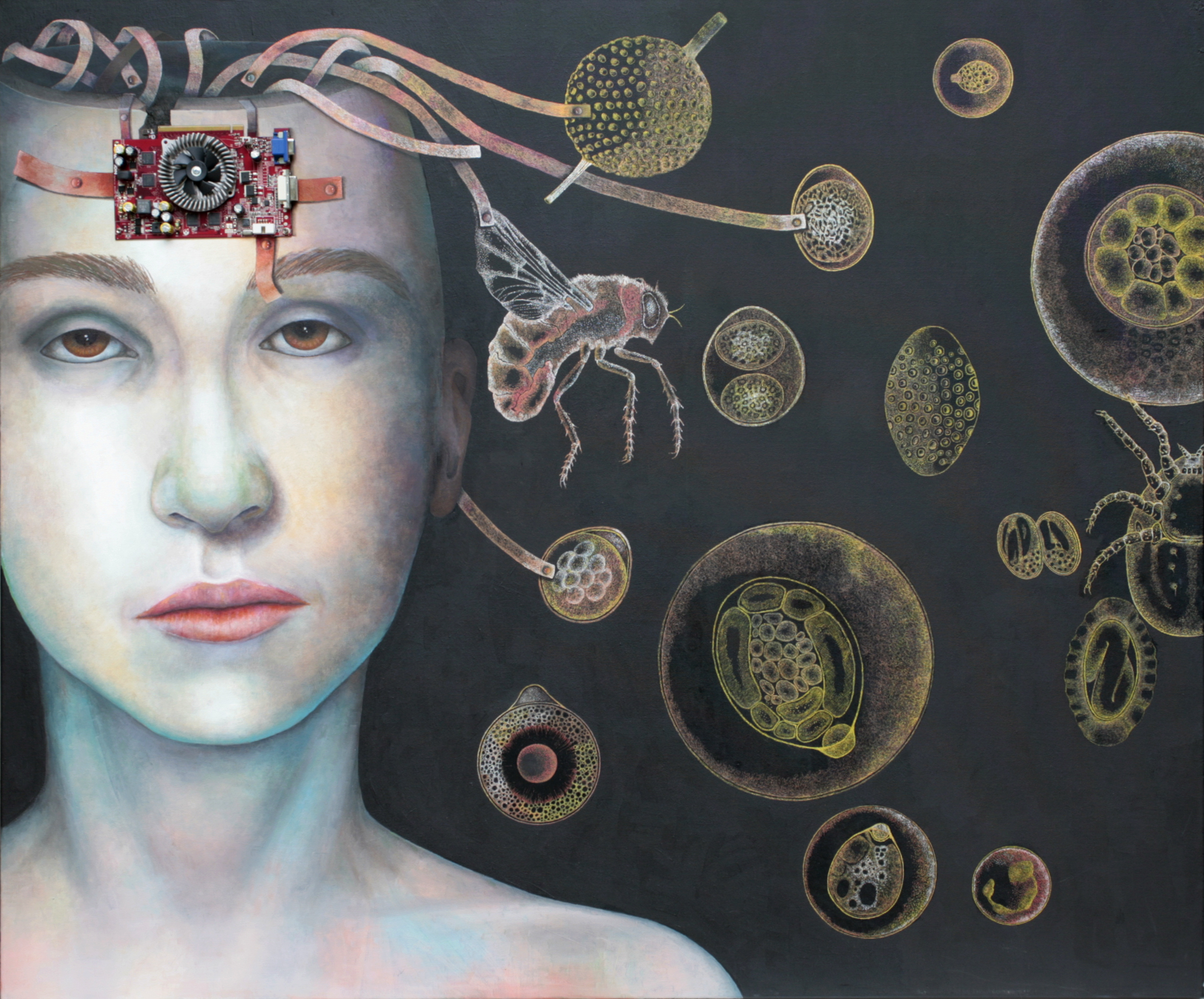
Parasites by Katrin Alvarez. Oil on canvas, 2011

Parasites appear frequently in biology-inspired fiction from ancient times onwards, with a flowering in the nineteenth century. These include intentionally disgusting alien monsters in science fiction films, often with analogues in nature. Authors and scriptwriters have, to some extent, exploited parasite biology: lifestyles including parasitoid, behaviour-altering parasite, brood parasite, parasitic castrator, and many forms of vampire are found in books and films. Some fictional parasites, like Count Dracula and Alien's Xenomorphs, have become well known in their own right.

== Context ==
Parasitism in nature is a biological relationship in which one species lives on or in another, causing it harm.

In evolutionary biology, parasitism is a relationship between species, where one organism, the parasite, lives on or in another organism, the host, causing it some harm, and is adapted structurally to this way of life. The entomologist E. O. Wilson has characterised parasites as "predators that eat prey in units of less than one". According to the immunologist John Playfair, the term 'parasite' is distinctly derogatory in common usage, where a parasite is "a sponger, a lazy profiteer, a drain on society". The idea is however much older. In ancient Rome, the parasitus was an accepted role in Roman society, in which a person could live off the hospitality of others, in return for "flattery, simple services, and a willingness to endure humiliation".

== Motifs ==
=== Nineteenth century novels ===
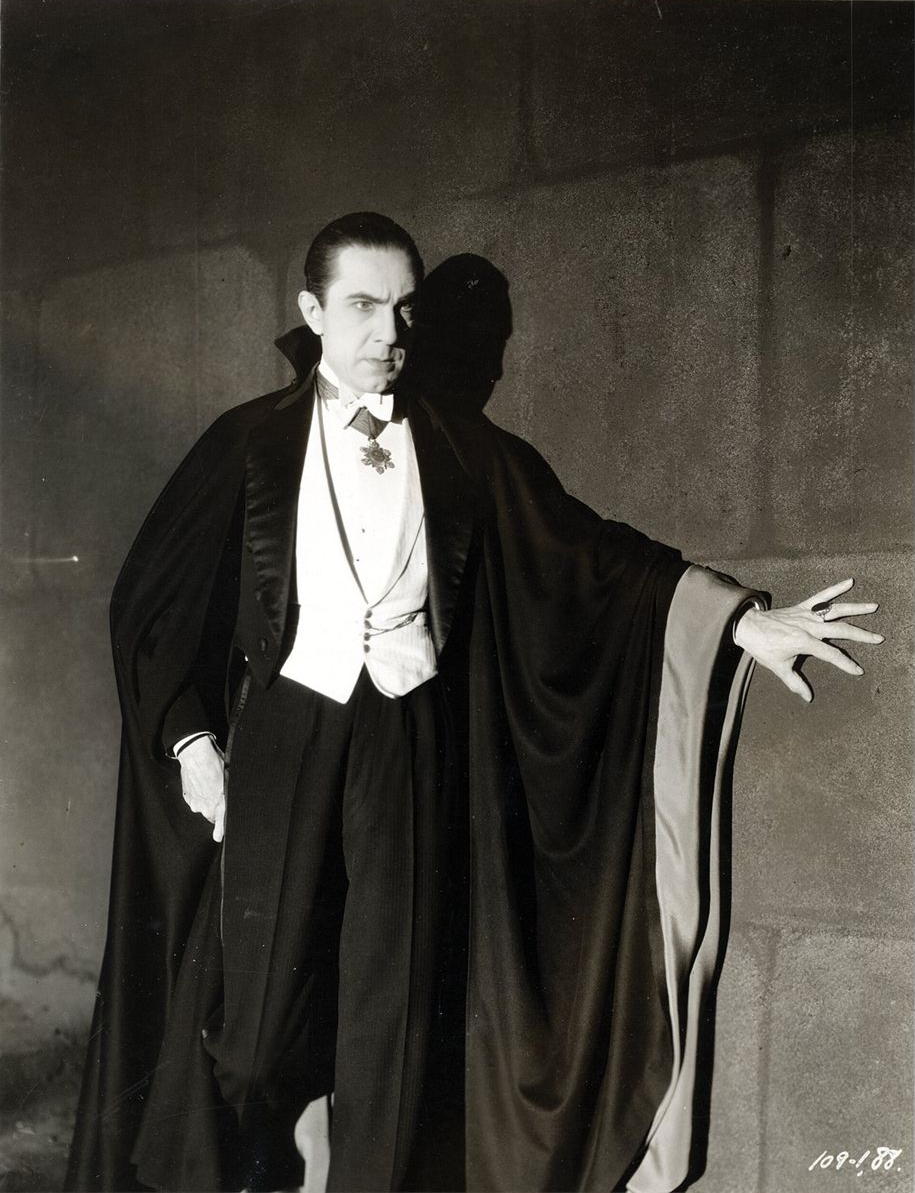
Bela Lugosi as the vampire Count Dracula, 1931

Parasitism featured repeatedly as a literary motif in the nineteenth century, though the mechanisms, biological or otherwise, are not always described in detail. For example, the eponymous Beetle in The Beetle by Richard Marsh, 1897, is parasitic and symbolically castrates the human protagonist. Bram Stoker's 1897 Dracula starts out as an apparently human host, welcoming guests to his home, before revealing his parasitic vampire nature. Conan Doyle's Parasite, in his 1894 book The Parasite, makes use of a form of mind control similar to the mesmerism of the Victorian era; it works on some hosts but not others.

=== Science fiction ===
Parasites, represented as extraterrestrial aliens or unnatural beings, are seen in science fiction as distasteful, in contrast to (mutualistic) symbiosis, and sometimes horrible. Practical uses can be made of them, but humans who do so may be destroyed by them. For example, Mira Grant's 2013 novel Parasite envisages a world where people's immune systems are maintained by genetically engineered tapeworms. They form readily understood characters, since, as Gary Westfahl explains, parasites need to exploit their hosts to survive and reproduce.

The social anthropologist Marika Moisseeff argues that Hollywood science fiction favours insects as villain characters because of their parasitism and their swarming behaviour. Such films, she continues, depict a ceaseless war of culture and nature as involving extraterrestrial species somewhat resembling insects, with humans as their hosts."

=== Range ===
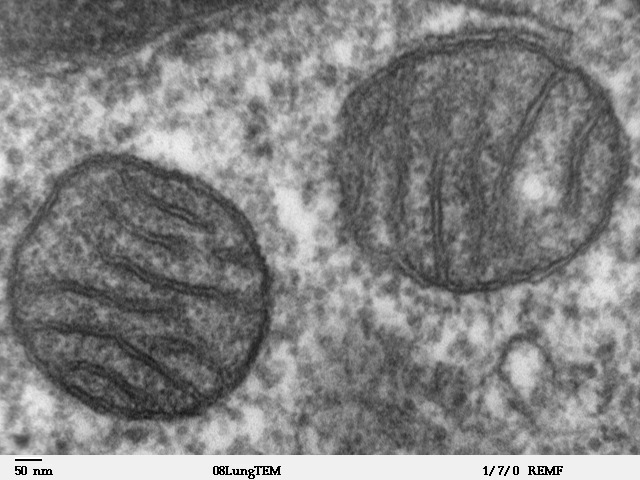
Among the many types of fictional parasite are the mitochondria of Parasite Eve; these are energy-generating organelles in animal cells, imagined as parasitic.

The range of accounts of fictional parasites and the media used to describe them have greatly increased since the nineteenth century, spanning among other things literary novels, science fiction novels and films, horror films, and video games. The table illustrates the variety of themes and approaches that have become possible.

Examples of the range of accounts of fictional parasites and their biological counterparts
Author	Work	Medium	Date	Parasite	Effect	Biological counterpart
David Cronenberg	Shivers	Science fiction body horror film	1975	Genetically engineered	Useful in organ transplants; sexually transmitted and aphrodisiac when modified by a deranged scientist	Genetic engineering and its ethical implications
Satoru Okada; Gunpei Yokoi; Hiroji Kiyotake; Yoshio Sakamoto	Metroid	Video game	1986	X Parasite	Deadly infection; confers useful energy and powers to vaccinated people	Pathogens such as bacteria, viruses; vaccines
Hideaki Sena (pharmacologist)	Parasite Eve	Science fiction horror novel	1995	Mitochondria cut free from mutualism in human cells	Deadly parasitism	Mitochondria, power-generating organelles, formerly free-living prokaryotic organisms, became mutualistic by symbiogenesis c. 2 billion years ago
Irvine Welsh	Filth	Novel	1998	Talking tapeworm	Sinister, comic; "the most attractive character in the novel"; becomes the sociopathic policeman's alter ego and better self.	Tapeworms, intestinal parasites

=== Fiction and reality ===
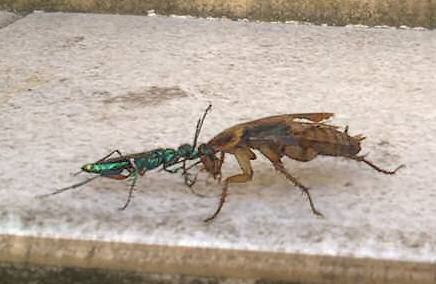
Emerald cockroach wasp (left) "walking" a paralyzed cockroach to its burrow

Kyle Munkittrick, on the Discover magazine website, writes that the great majority of aliens, far from being as strange as possible, are humanoid. Ben Guarino, in The Washington Post, observes that despite all the "cinematic aliens' gravid grotesquerie", earthly parasites have more horrible ways of life. Guarino cites parasitic wasps that lay their eggs inside living caterpillars, inspiring A. E. Van Vogt's 1939 story "Discord in Scarlet", Robert Heinlein's 1951 novel The Puppet Masters, and Ridley Scott's 1979 film Alien. The eponymous Alien has a "dramatic" life-cycle. Giant eggs hatch into face-huggers that grasp the host's mouth, forcing him to swallow an embryo. It rapidly grows in his intestines, soon afterwards erupting from his chest and growing into a gigantic predatory animal resembling an insect. Guarino cites the parasitologist Michael J. Smout as saying that the "massive changes" are feasible, giving the example of flatworms that transform from an egg to a tadpole-like form to an infective worm. The biologist Claude dePamphilis agrees, too, that parasites can acquire genes from their hosts, giving as example a broomrape plant that had taken up genes from its host on 52 occasions, having thoroughly overcome the host plant's defences. They suggest further themes for future science fiction films, including emerald jewel wasps that turn cockroaches into subservient puppets, able to crawl but unable to act independently; or the barnacle-like crustaceans that castrate their crab hosts, or grow into their brains, altering their behaviour to care for the young barnacles. All the same, a 2013 poll of scientists and engineers by Popular Mechanics magazine revealed that the parasite-based science fiction films The War of the Worlds (Byron Haskin, 1953) and Alien were among their top ten favourites.

== Types of parasite ==
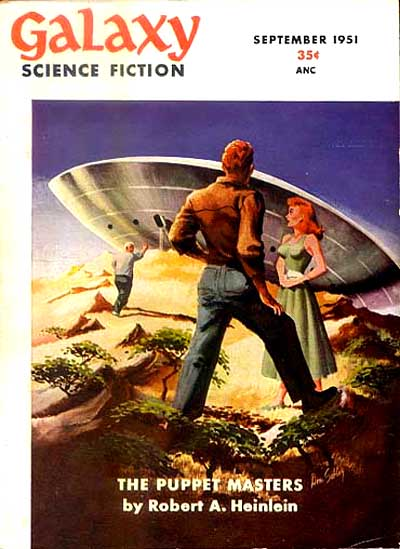
Robert A. Heinlein's behaviour-altering The Puppet Masters on the cover of the September 1951 issue of Galaxy Science Fiction

Several types of parasite, corresponding more or less accurately to some of those known in biology, are found in literature. These include haematophagic parasites (fictional vampires), parasitoids, behaviour-altering parasites, brood parasites, parasitic castrators, and trophically transmitted parasites, as detailed below.

=== Haematophagic parasite ===
In ancient times, myths of blood-drinking demons were widespread, including Lilith who feasted on the blood of babies.

Fictional vampires—haematophagic parasites—began in the modern era with Count Dracula, the title character of Bram Stoker's 1897 gothic horror novel Dracula, and have since appeared in many books and films ranging from horror to science fiction. Along with the shift in genres went a diversification of life-forms and life-cycles, including blood-drinking plants like the "strange orchid" in The Thing from Another World (1951), aliens like H. G. Wells's Martians in The War of the Worlds, "cyber-vamps" like "The Stainless Steel Leech" and "Marid and the Trail of Blood", and psychic bloodsuckers, as in Arthur Conan Doyle's The Parasite and Robert Wiene's 1920 film The Cabinet of Dr. Caligari.

=== Parasitoid ===
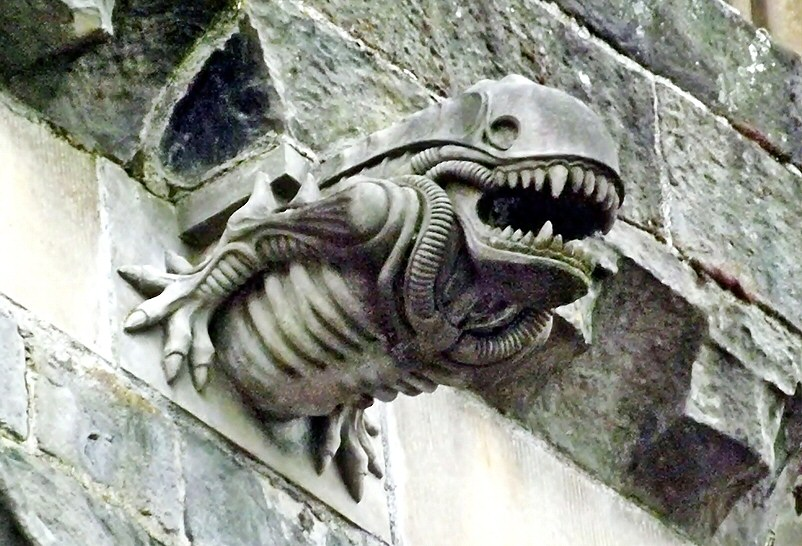
A 1990s gargoyle at Paisley Abbey resembling a Xenomorph parasitoid from Alien

The Xenomorph in Alien is a parasitoid, inevitably fatal to its human host. It has a life-cycle stage that grows inside the person's body; when mature, the predatory adult Xenomorph bursts out, killing the host. This behaviour was inspired by parasitoid wasps which have just such a life-cycle.

The molecular biologist Alex Sercel compares Xenomorph biology to that of parasitoid wasps and nematomorph worms, arguing that there is a close match. Sercel notes that the way the Xenomorph grasps a human's face to implant its embryo is comparable to the way a parasitoid wasp lays its eggs in a living host. He compares the Xenomorph life cycle to that of the nematomorph Paragordius tricuspidatus, which grows to fill its host's body cavity before bursting out and killing it.

The marine biologist Alistair Dove writes that there are multiple parallels between Xenomorphs and parasitoids, though there are in his view more disturbing life cycles in real biology. He identifies parallels include the placing of an embryo in the host; its growth in the host; the resulting death of the host; and alternating generations, as in the Digenea (trematodes).

=== Behaviour-altering parasite ===
Mind-controlling parasites feature in twentieth century science fiction. In Robert A. Heinlein's 1951 The Puppet Masters, slug-like parasites from outer space arrive on Earth, fasten to people's backs and seize control of their nervous systems, making their hosts the eponymous puppets. In Star Trek II: The Wrath of Khan, the Ceti eel tunnels into the ear of its human host until it reaches the brain. This is a behaviour-altering parasite analogous to Toxoplasma gondii, which causes infected mice to become unafraid of cats. This makes them easier to catch and consume and, once an infected mouse has been eaten, the parasite will then infect the cat, its definitive host, in which it can reproduce sexually. The Goa'uld in Stargate SG-1 enters through the host's neck and coils around the host's spine, assuming control. The Slug/Squid alien in The Hidden similarly enters via the host's mouth before taking over its body.

=== Brood parasite ===
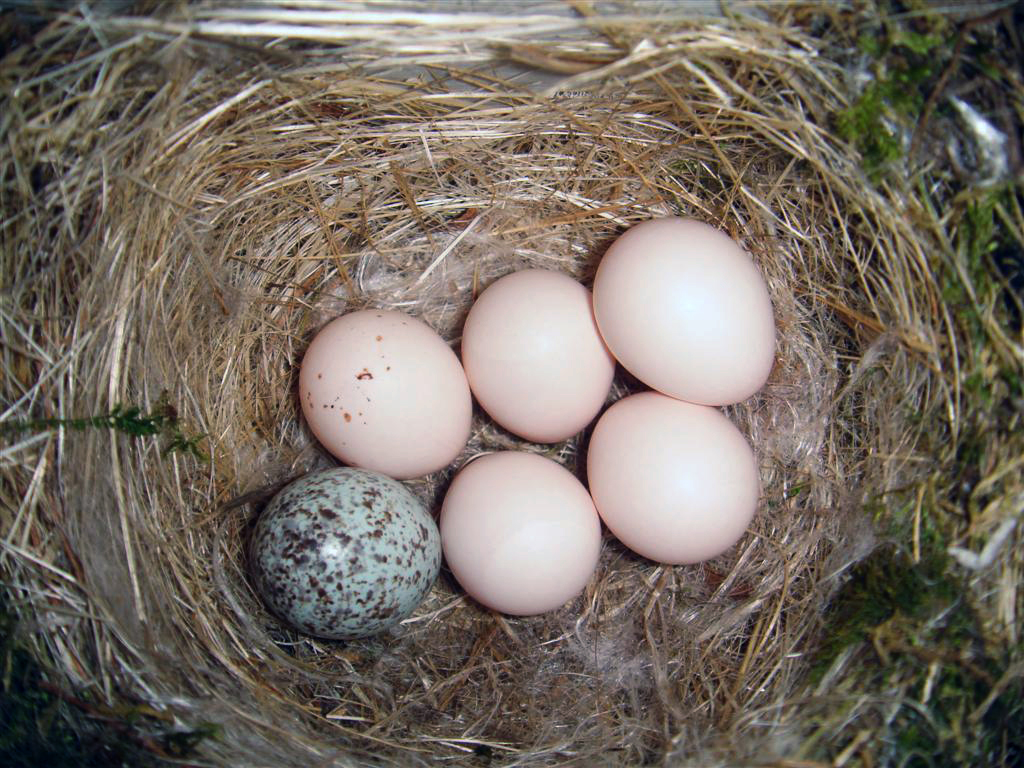
Brood parasites lay their eggs in other birds' nests for them to raise, inspiring the science fiction novel The Midwich Cuckoos.

Brood parasitism is not a common theme in fiction. An early example was John Wyndham's 1957 novel The Midwich Cuckoos, which sees the women of an English village give birth to and then bring up a group of alien children. The aliens are telepathic, and intend to take over the world. In nature, brood parasitism occurs in birds such as the European cuckoo, which lay their eggs in the nests of their hosts. The young cuckoos hatch quickly and eject the host's eggs or chicks; the host parents then feed the young cuckoos as if they were their own offspring, until they fledge. As a plot device, this allows aliens and humans to interact closely. A somewhat similar approach is taken in Octavia E. Butler's 1987–1989 Lilith's Brood, but the offspring born to the human mother there is an alien-human hybrid rather than simply an alien.

=== Parasitic castrator ===
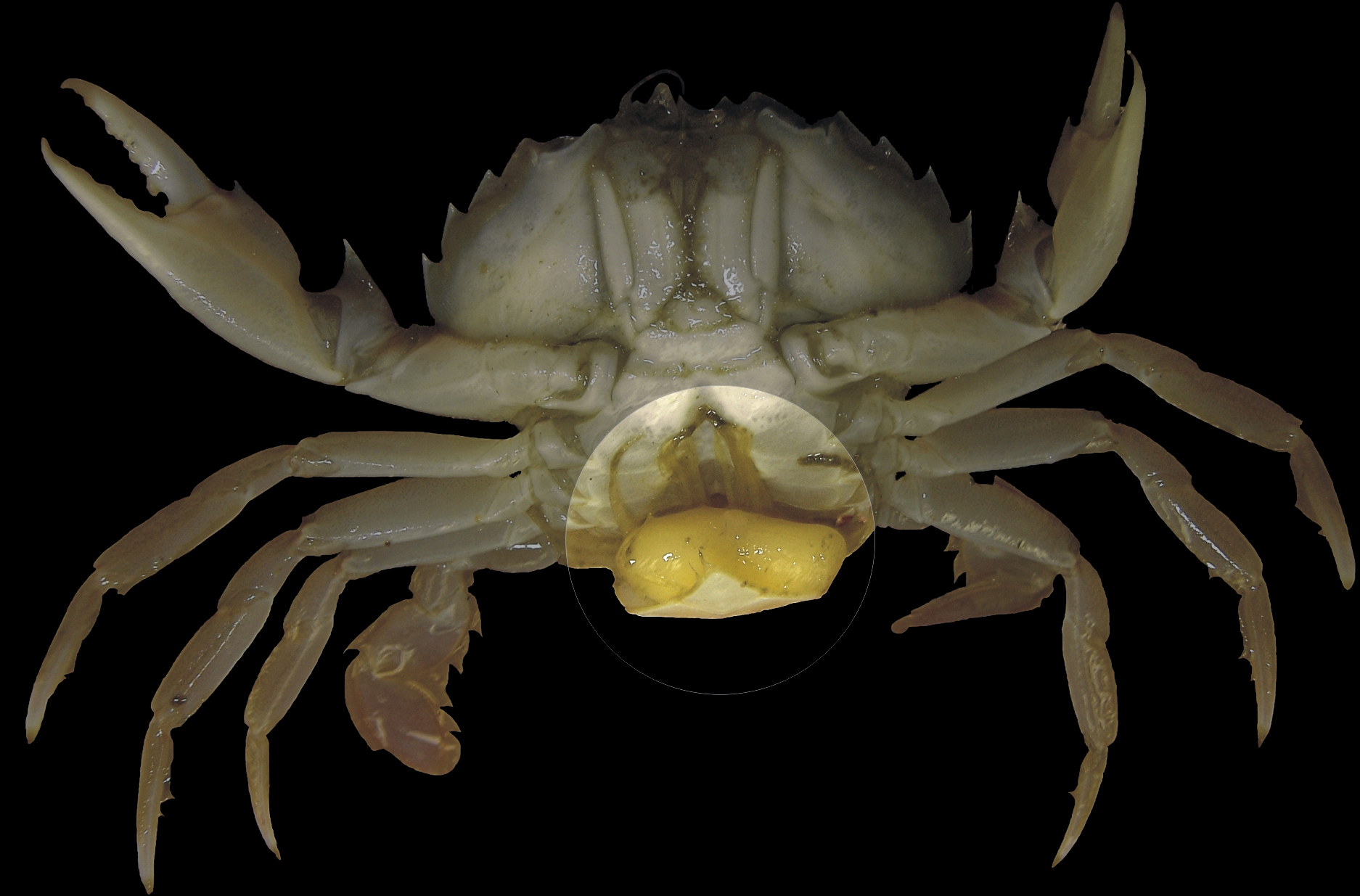
Sacculina, a parasitic castrator (highlighted), inspired Philip Fracassi's novella of that name.

Parasitic castration is found in nature in greatly reduced parasites that feed on the gonads of their crab hosts, making use of the energy that would have gone into reproduction. It is seen in fiction in Philip Fracassi's 2017 horror novella Sacculina, named for a genus of barnacle-like crustaceans with this lifestyle. It tells the tale of a chartered fishing boat, far from home, that is overrun by parasites from the deep.

=== Trophically-transmitted parasite ===
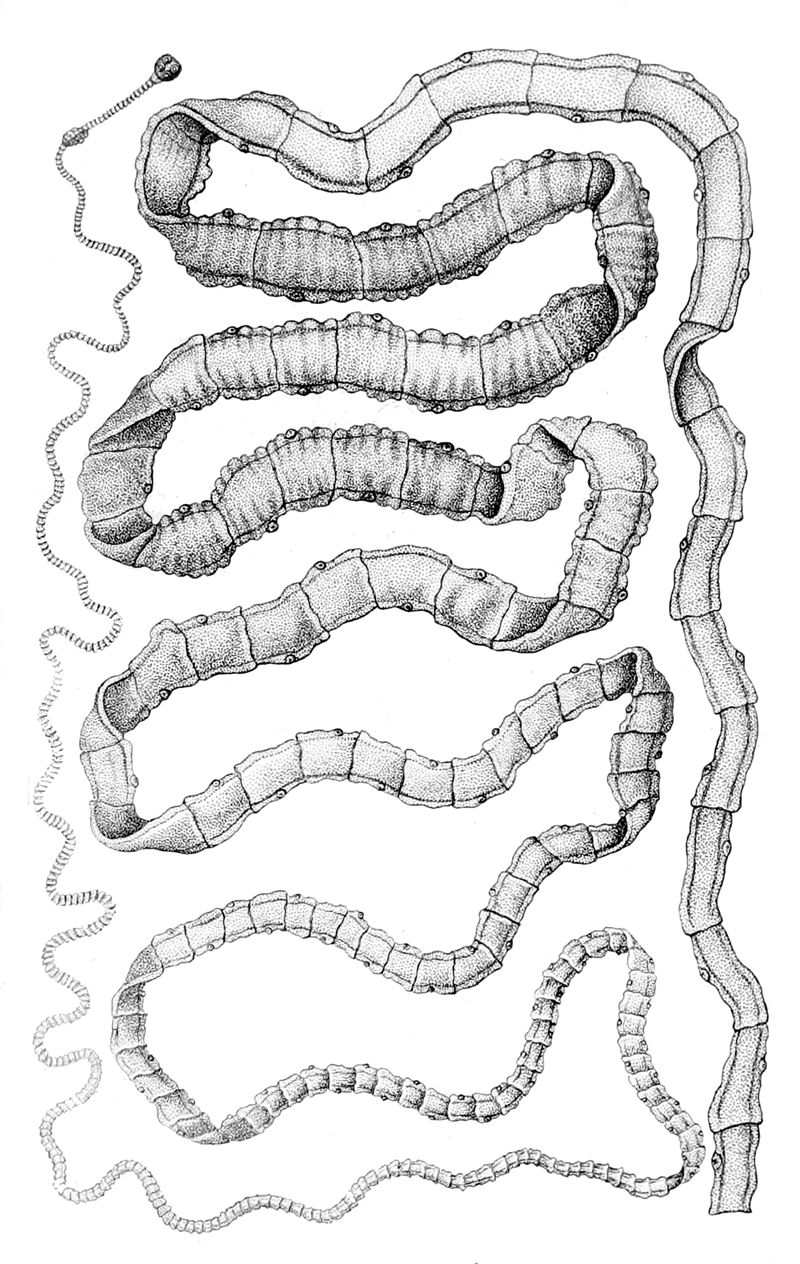
Pork tapeworm, an intestinal parasite transmitted via human faeces to pigs, and back to humans via inadequately-cooked meat

The genetically engineered tapeworm in Mira Grant's novel Parasite, and the talking tapeworm in Irvine Welsh's novel Filth, are fictional versions of conventional intestinal parasites. Tapeworms have complex life-cycles, often involving two or more hosts of different species, and are transmitted as the eggs are passed in faeces and eaten by another host, only for the host to be eaten, passing the parasite on to the predator. The unattractive lifecycle allows the novelists to exploit their readers' emotional reactions to the parasites. The parasite in Welsh's novel has been described as a "kind of sinister but strangely comic element".

== See also ==
- Evolution in fiction
- Genetics in fiction
- Symbiosis in fiction
- Tuberculosis in culture
