= The Last Defender of Camelot (2002 book) =

2002 short story collection by Roger Zelazny

- Cover of the first edition
- Author: Roger Zelazny
- Cover artist: Scott Grimando
- Language: English
- Genre: Science fiction, fantasy
- Publisher: Ibooks, Inc
- Publication date: 2002
- Publication place: United States
- Media type: Print (paperback)
- Pages: 416 pp
- ISBN: 0-7434-3510-9
- OCLC: 48883249

The Last Defender of Camelot is a collection of short stories written by science fiction writer Roger Zelazny. It was published by Ibooks, Inc in 2002 and has an identical title to an earlier collection.

== Contents ==
- "Introduction" by Robert Silverberg
- "Comes Now the Power"
- "For a Breath I Tarry"
- "Engine at Heartspring's Center"
- "Halfjack"
- "Home Is the Hangman"
- "Permafrost"
- "LOKI 7281"
- "Mana from Heaven"
- "24 Views of Mt. Fuji, by Hokusai"
- "Come Back to the Killing Ground, Alice, My Love"
- "The Last Defender of Camelot"
