= The Last Defender of Camelot =

The Last Defender of Camelot may refer to:

- The Last Defender of Camelot (short story), a 1979 short story by Roger Zelazny
- The Last Defender of Camelot (1980 book), a collection of short stories by Roger Zelazny
- The Last Defender of Camelot (2002 book), a collection of short stories by Roger Zelazny
- The Last Defender of Camelot (The Twilight Zone), an episode of the 1985 TV series The Twilight Zone
