= Symbiosis (disambiguation) =

Symbiosis is any close and long-term biological interaction between two organisms of different species.

Symbiosis may also refer to:

== Arts and entertainment ==
=== Music ===
- Symbiosis (A Bullet for Pretty Boy album), 2012
- Symbiosis (Bill Evans album), 1974
- Symbiosis (Demdike Stare album), 2009
- Symbiosis, a 1995 album by Poverty's No Crime
- Symbiosis (musical ensemble), ambient music trio

=== Other arts and entertainment ===
- Symbiosis (1982 film), a film directed by Paul Gerber
- Symbiosis (1976 film), an animated short film by David Cox
- Symbiosis (sculpture), a 1981 public artwork by American artist Richard Hunt
- "Symbiosis" (Star Trek: The Next Generation), TV series episode
- Symbiosis Gathering, a music and art festival

== Other uses ==
- Symbiosis (chemical)
- Symbiosis Society, a family of educational institutions in India
- Simbiosys, a chemical software company

== See also ==
- Cymbiosis, a music magazine
- Symbiote (disambiguation)
- Symbiont, a 2014 novel by Mira Grant
