= Frank Howard Atkins =

British writer

Frank Howard Atkins (pen name F. St. Mars) (1882–1921) was a British writer. He wrote more than 180 short stories in pulp magazines, most of which were published between 1908 and 1935 under his pen name.

Atkins' stories under the Mars pseudonym usually revolved around animals. The "F. St. Mars" stories appeared in Pearson's Magazine, The Grand Magazine, The Novel Magazine, The Red Magazine, and Adventure in the United States. His works were illustrated by popular artists such as George Vernon Stokes and Harry Rountree.

His father was the British writer Francis Henry Atkins.

== Bibliography ==
- Caught by a Comet (1910) (as Fenton Ash)
- People of the Wild (1911)
- Snapshots of the Wild (1919)
- The Way of the Wild (1919)
- Pinion and Paw (1919)
- The Wild Unmasked - Published by W. & R. Chambers, London (1920)
