= Symbiote =

Symbiote may refer to:

- Symbiote (comics), a fictional alien species in Marvel Comics
- Symbiont, an organism living in symbiosis with another
- Symbiotes (beetle), a genus of beetles
- Symbiotes (bacterium), a genus of bacteria
- the Goa'uld, sometimes called symbiotes, in the Stargate franchise

== See also ==
- Symbiosis (disambiguation)
