= The Grand Magazine =

British pulp magazine

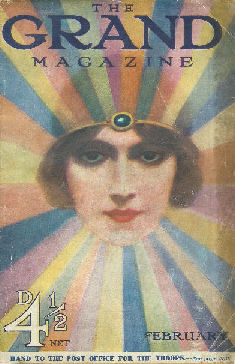
- Cover of Grand Magazine for February 1916
- Editor: Alderson Anderson, 1905–1910
- Frequency: Monthly
- First issue: February 1905
- Final issue Number: April 1940; 422
- Company: George Newnes Ltd
- Country: UK
- Language: English

The Grand Magazine was the first British pulp magazine. It was published monthly between February 1905 and April 1940. Published by George Newnes Ltd, it initially emulated Newnes's highly successful Strand Magazine, featuring a mix of fiction and non-fiction. In 1908, it was renamed The Grand Magazine of Fiction.

The New York Times greeted the appearance of the new magazine with the comment that "this is a promising periodical, containing much that will commend itself to the decent popular taste", and added that "Mr Herbert Greenhough Smith, who has been the editor of The Strand Magazine, occupies the same post on the new periodical".

Although Herbert Greenhough Smith was associated with the launch of the magazine, the first editor, until 1910, was Alderson Anderson.

In its first decade, The Grand carried fiction by such authors as P. G. Wodehouse, Edgar Wallace, Rafael Sabatini, Talbot Mundy, H. C. Bailey, E. W. Hornung, Marie Belloc Lowndes, Ruby M. Ayres, F. St. Mars, Crosbie Garstin and Herman George Scheffauer. The magazine also serialised H. G. Wells' The Passionate Friends: A Novel. Later contributors to The Grand included Agatha Christie, E. Phillips Oppenheim, Baroness Orczy, E. F. Benson, Ernest Bramah, Bertram Atkey, and A. M. Burrage.
