= The Last Defender of Camelot (1980 book) =

1980 short story collection by Roger Zelazny

- Cover of the first edition
- Author: Roger Zelazny
- Cover artist: Carl Lundgren
- Language: English
- Genre: Science fiction and Fantasy
- Publisher: Pocket Books
- Publication date: 1980
- Publication place: United States
- Media type: Print (paperback)
- Pages: 308 pp
- ISBN: 0-671-41773-8
- OCLC: 7011305

The Last Defender of Camelot is an annotated anthology of science fiction and fantasy short stories by American writer Roger Zelazny.

== Contents ==
This is a list of the short stories included in the 1980 edition. The ones marked as "UM" appeared only in the limited Underwood-Miller editions.

- "Passion Play"
- "Horseman!"
- "The Stainless Steel Leech"
- "A Thing of Terrible Beauty"
- "He Who Shapes"
- "Comes Now the Power"
- "Auto-Da-Fe"
- "Damnation Alley" (magazine version)
- "For a Breath I Tarry"
- "The Engine at Heartspring's Center"
- "The Game of Blood and Dust"
- "No Award"
- "Is there a Demon Lover in the House?"
- "The Last Defender of Camelot"
- "Stand Pat, Ruby Stone"
- "Halfjack"
- "Exeunt Omnes" (UM)
- "Fire And/Or Ice" (UM)
- "Shadowjack" (UM)
- "A Very Good Year" (UM)
