= Symbiosis (chemical) =

The biological term symbiosis was first used in chemistry by C. K. Jørgensen in 1964, to refer to the process by which a hard ligand on a metal predisposes the metal to receive another hard ligand rather than a soft one. Two superficially antithetical phenomena occur: symbiosis and antisymbiosis.

== Chemical antisymbiosis ==
This is found principally with soft metals. Two soft ligands in mutual trans position will have a destabilizing effect on each other. The effect is also found with borderline metals in the presence of high trans effect ligands. For example the selenocyanate ion trans to the soft carbon dioxide in trans-Rh(PPh_{3})_{2}(CO)(NCSe) bonds via the nitrogen, the harder of its two donors. The phenomenon may be explained in terms of a trans influence:

“With two π-acid ligands in mutual trans positions at a class-b metal, there would be a destabilizing competition for the dπ electrons on the metal. A π-acid bonded to a soft metal thus makes a metal a harder Lewis acid. Similarly a soft σ-donor will tend to polarize the electron density on a soft metal, causing it to favour an electrovalently bonded ligand in the trans position.”

== Chemical symbiosis ==
This effect occurs with class-a metals such as iron(II). The Cyclopentadienyl complex (C_{5}H_{5})Fe(CO)_{2}(SCN) is an example of chemical symbiosis. The cyclopentadienyl directs the thiocyanate to bond through its softer Sulphur donor. A more definitive example are the halopentamminocobalt(III) ions, Co(NH_{3})_{5}X^{2+}, which are more stable when the halogen, X, is fluoride than with iodide, and the halopentcyanocobalt(III) ions, Co(CN)_{5}X^{3−}, which are most stable when the halogen is iodine.

“Hard bases (electronegative donor atoms) retain their valence (outer shell) electrons when attached to a given central metal ion, thus enabling the metal ion to retain more of its positive charge, making it a hard Lewis acid. With soft bases the central metal atom is made a softer Lewis acid, because the metal’s positive charge is reduced by delocalization of electron density from the ligand into the ligand-metal bond. But we have the distinction that with a class-a metal there is little concomitant polarization of the electron density away from the trans position of the metal. In addition, symbiosis, unlike antisymbiosis, is probably not specifically trans directional, and is just as effective in, say, tetrahedral complexes.”
