= Parasite (Grant novel) =

2013 novel by Mira Grant

- Author: Seanan McGuire
- Language: English
- Series: Parasitology
- Release number: 1
- Genre: Science fiction
- Set in: California
- Publisher: Orbit Books
- Publication date: October 29, 2013
- Publication place: United States
- ISBN: 9780356501925
- Followed by: Symbiont

Parasite is a 2013 science fiction novel written by Seanan McGuire under the pseudonym Mira Grant. Published by Orbit Books, it is the first volume of the Parasitology trilogy. It was followed by Symbiont (2014) and Chimera (2015).

The book envisages a world with fictional parasites, where people's immune systems are maintained by genetically engineered tapeworms.

== Plot summary ==
In 2015, Dr. Shanti Cale works for SymboGen. She designs a genetically modified species of Diphyllobothrium tapeworms. The tapeworms are marketed as Intestinal Bodyguards™ and revolutionize healthcare; they live inside their human host, manufacturing drugs and eliminating the need for most medications.

In 2021, Sally Mitchell has a seizure and is involved in a severe car collision. She recovers from brain death, a feat thought to be impossible. Scientists hypothesize that her life was saved by her Intestinal Bodyguard™. Six years later, Sal has regular sessions with Dr. Morrison. She has no memory of her life before the accident. Her personality has changed significantly. Her relationship with her family is strained but loving, since she has no memory of her childhood. Sal works for an animal shelter and has a boyfriend named Nathan, who is a parasitologist.

At a mall, Sal and her sister Joyce see two people sleepwalking. They hear news reports about similar cases throughout the Bay Area. Their father, former USAMRIID commander Alfred Mitchell, suspects that SymboGen is involved. The next day, Sal and Nathan witness a bystander experience a similar sleepwalking episode. They rescue the man’s dog, Beverly.

Dr. Steve Banks, one of SymboGen's founders, offers Sal a job; she declines. Sal's handler Chave contracts the sleeping sickness and attacks Sal. Sal is rescued by security guards and taken into quarantine. She is examined and determined to be free of infection. Sal's friend Sherman, also a SymboGen employee, is taken to quarantine. She fears he has been infected or killed; Dr. Banks refuses to tell her.

After hearing about Sal's experience, Nathan realizes that the sleeping sickness is caused by a parasitic infection. He examines a patient and sees a growth under the skin which fluoresces under ultraviolet light. Sal receives a message urging her to call an unknown number for answers. She calls, and a mysterious woman arranges a meeting.

A sleeping sickness patient attacks and kills Nathan's research assistant. Nathan is summoned to the hospital. The next morning, three sleeping sickness patients attack Sal's house. Sal receives a letter instructing her to go to Clayton. There, they meet Dr. Shanti Cale and Tansy, her mentally unstable companion. Nathan reveals that Dr. Cale is his mother; she disappeared after being forced out of SymboGen when Nathan was a child. Dr. Cale is now confined to a wheelchair as the result of ingesting an early-generation tapeworm; she holds information that could damage SymboGen substantially.

Dr. Cale introduces them to Adam. She claims that Adam was created from her early-generation tapeworm, implanted into the body of a brain-dead man. Tansy is also a tapeworm in a human body. Dr. Cale reveals that SymboGen spliced genes from Toxoplasma gondii into the Intestinal Bodyguard™, accidentally giving the tapeworm the ability to cross the blood–brain barrier. The sleeping sickness is a result of this process.

Sal's father brings her to USAMRIID headquarters, where he tricks her into giving up information about the sleeping sickness. Sleepwalkers escape from their restraints, killing several guards. Sal and her father escape unharmed. Joyce begins to show signs of infection and is placed in quarantine.

Sal moves out of her parents’ home, angry at their treatment of her. Tansy arrives with news. The Intestinal Bodyguards™ are improving in their ability to migrate to their hosts’ brains without damage. Soon, they will be able to take over without causing the sleeping sickness. In that case, they will be virtually indistinguishable from normal humans. Tansy gives Sal a thumb drive and asks her to steal data from SymboGen.

Sal arrives at SymboGen and meets with Dr. Banks. She steals the data and goes to the lab, where she is accosted by Sherman. Sherman demands the data; Sal refuses. Tansy arrives, revealing that Sherman is also a tapeworm. He plans to use the stolen data to exterminate humanity, allowing the Intestinal Bodyguards™ to seamlessly take over their human hosts. Tansy and Sal escape with the data. Tansy distracts a mob of sleepwalkers while Nathan rescues Sal.

Back at Dr. Cale’s lab, Sal undergoes an MRI. It reveals that she is also a tapeworm.

== Style ==
Each chapter begins with in-universe quotations. These include memoirs from SymboGen scientists, scientific articles, and a report on the ad campaign used to introduce tapeworms to the general public.

== Reception and awards ==
Writing for NPR, Genevieve Valentine wrote that the novel reflected contemporary issues in American healthcare, including "pharmaceutical brand ethics, anti-vaccination activism, and the overuse of antibiotics." Valentine noted that Grant is interested in the ethical implications of the technology; the author presents both the government and corporations as flawed institutions filled with individuals of varying moral character. The reviewer had some critiques, noting that Parasite felt like a set-up for later books in the series and that Sal was "slow on the uptake", allowing readers to spot plot twists before the protagonist did.

Anthony Cardino of Strange Horizons stated that Grant's novels "dance lightly across genre boundaries." Parasite combines elements of a conspiracy thriller with science fiction. Cardino's praised Grant's ability to write strong female characters in first person. Further, the review noted that Sally's amnesia functions as a plot device which allows Grant to provide exposition without it feeling out of place. Cardino concluded that the novel is "part conspiracy thriller, part science fiction, part horror, and part character study: in Parasite, Mira Grant strives to provide something for everyone, and pretty well succeeds."

Kirkus Reviews stated that the novel was an example of Grant's penchant for tackling unusual subjects. The review praised the action and pacing despite the inclusion of "a great deal of silly melodrama." The review stated that readers with strong stomachs would enjoy the novel, while noting that the abrupt ending felt like a placeholder for later books in the series.

The novel was a finalist for the 2014 Hugo Award for Best Novel.
