= Symbiont (novel) =

2014 novel by Mira Grant

- Author: Seanan McGuire
- Language: English
- Series: Parasitology
- Release number: 2
- Genre: Science fiction
- Set in: California
- Publisher: Orbit Books
- Publication date: 25 November 2014
- Publication place: United States
- Pages: 608 (First edition)
- ISBN: 9780316218993
- Preceded by: Parasite
- Followed by: Chimera

Symbiont is a 2014 science fiction novel by Seanan McGuire, writing under the pseudonym Mira Grant. It is the second book of the Parasitology trilogy, taking place between Parasite and Chimera.

== Plot ==
In 2027, the sleeping sickness spreads as more tapeworms attempt to take over the bodies of their human hosts. Dr. Cale fears that the sleeping sickness will lead to the end of the human race.

Sal gives Dr. Cale a thumb drive full of information stolen from SymboGen. Nathan and Sal return to their apartment to rescue their dogs. They are attacked by sleepwalkers, but they escape and return to Dr. Cale's lab. Sal has a seizure, a result of damage sustained when her tapeworm bpdy integrated into Sally Mitchell's brain. Dr. Cale recommends brain surgery.

Meanwhile, Dr. Banks takes Tansy prisoner and begins experimenting on her.

Dr. Fang, a colleague of Dr. Cale, successfully performs Sal's surgery. As they leave the hospital, a mob of sleepwalkers attacks. Sal and Nathan become separated. Sal is shot with a tranquilizer. She awakens to find herself in the custody of USAMRIID. She reunites with Colonel Mitchell, who understands that she is a tapeworm chimera. He plans to keep her in quarantine, but he tries to hide her true nature from his superiors. Sherman, posing as a USAMRIID employee, kills Sal's guard and kidnaps her.

Sherman locks Sal inside a renovated shopping mall. He and his compatriots plan to kill off humanity, replacing them with tapeworm chimeras. Sherman attempts to seduce Sal by manipulating their pheromones; she rejects him. During her captivity, Sal meets Ronnie. Ronnie is a male chimera living in the body of a young girl after his original host's immune system rejected him. Sal escapes from the shopping mall by climbing through the air vents. Ronnie allows her to escape.

Sal returns to Dr. Cale's lab, which has been relocated into an abandoned candy factory. Dr. Banks arrives at the lab. He brings a woman named Anna with him, introducing her as another chimera. Dr. Cale's workers imprison Dr. Banks. They learn that has forcibly converted one of his employees into a chimera, killing the human in the process.

Adam and Sal realize that Anna shares a scent with Tansy. Dr. Banks has extracted pieces of Tansy's tapeworm and forced them into another human brain; Anna's body is rejecting her implanted worm. Dr. Banks promises to return the original Tansy if Dr. Cale will help save Anna.

Sal plans to break into SymboGen headquarters and rescue Tansy. Using Dr. Banks as a hostage, she and Nathan commandeer a ferry. They are accompanied by Fishy, one of Dr. Cale’s employees. During the journey, Sally recognizes that she has gained the ability to sense tapeworm pheromones. Some sleepwalkers begin obeying Sal's simple commands, indicating that it may be possible to cure some of them.

The group arrives at SymboGen headquarters. Dr. Banks leads them to a lab, where Tansy remains alive but unconscious. Sal's team brings Tansy to the entrance, where they are caught by Colonel Mitchell and his USAMRIID soldiers. Sal pretends to be the original Sally Mitchell in order to appease the colonel. She and Dr. Banks remain at SymboGen; Nathan and Fishy leave with Tansy.

In an epilogue, Ronnie pours a bag of white crystals into a reservoir which supplies a refugee camp.

== Reception ==
Publishers Weekly called the book a "cerebral and visceral sequel." The review praised the relationships between characters, particularly the parent-child relationships of Dr. Cale and her children, as well as between Sal and Colonel Mitchell. The same review felt that the pacing was slowed by the philosophical content, but that the "richness of the plot sustains the reader's interest..."

Niall Alexander of Reactor wrote that the novel is "accessible, action-packed, and its premise remains appallingly plausible..." Despite this, the reviewer felt that the book lacked direction and was overly long. Alexander wrote that the plot was filled with "incidents for incident's sake", which lessened the overall impact of the story. The reviewer concluded that Symbiont was inferior to Parasite due to these issues.

Kirkus Reviews criticized the novel, writing that Sal is a "creepily unsympathetic" protagonist. The review felt that the novel was overly long and stated that the supporting cast was not compelling.
