= Francis Henry Atkins =

British writer (1847–1927)

Francis Henry Atkins (c. 1847–1927) was a British writer of "pulp fiction", in particular science fiction aimed at younger readers. He wrote under the pseudonyms Frank Aubrey and Fenton Ash.

His son was writer Frank Howard Atkins.

== Bibliography ==
- The Devil-Tree of El Dorado: A Romance of British Guiana (1897)
- A Queen of Atlantis: A Romance of the Caribbean (1899)
- King of the Dead: A Weird Romance (1903)
- The Sacred Mountain (1904)
- The Sunken Island, or the Pirates of Atlantis (1904)
- The Radium Seekers, or The Wonderful Black Nugget (1905)
- The Temple of Fire, or The Mysterious Island (1905)
- The Hermit of the Mountains (1907)
- A Trip to Mars (1907)
- A Son of the Stars (1908)
- A King of Mars (1909)
- By Airship to Ophir (1911)
- The Black Opal: A Romance of Thrilling Adventure (1915)
- In Polar Seas (1916)
