= The Parasite =

1894 novelette by Sir Arthur Conan Doyle

First edition (publ. Constable & Co.)

The Parasite is an 1894 novelette by Sir Arthur Conan Doyle. It was also published in the United States, in four instalments, in Harper's Weekly in November and December 1894 (with illustrations by Howard Pyle); and, then, as a combined volume, by Harper & Brothers in January 1895.

The Parasite makes use of a form of mind control similar to the mesmerism of the Victorian era.

== Plot summary ==
The main character is a young man known as Austin Gilroy. He studies physiology and knows a professor who is studying the occult. The young man is introduced to a middle-aged woman known as Miss Penclosa, who has a crippled leg and psychic powers. She is a friend of the Professor's wife. The skeptical Gilroy's fiancée, Agatha, is put into a trance to prove Miss Penclosa's powers. This succeeds and Gilroy begins to go to the Professor's house where Miss Penclosa practices her powers on him. This is so Gilroy can look at the physical part of the powers.

Miss Penclosa 'falls in love' with the unfortunate Gilroy. She starts to use her powers on him to make him caress her, and utter sweet nothings to her. He loses his temper and rejects her love, and she begins to play tricks on him with her powers. The series of cruel tricks ends with him in Agatha's room carrying a small bottle of sulphuric acid. He notices that it is half-past three. He rushes to Miss Penclosa's home and demands her presence at the door. The nurse there answers in a frightened tone that she died at half-past three.

== Adaptations ==
Writer Patrick Roddy and director Andrew Froemke released a feature-film adaptation of The Parasite in 1997.

Writer/director Adam Zanzie released a short film adaptation of The Parasite for the David Lynch Master's in Film program on November 22, 2015. Zanzie wrote the screenplay and directed the film, which made its commercial debut on July 19, 2016 at the Tivoli Theatre as a featured film in the St. Louis Filmmakers Showcase. It later screened at the Trash Film Festival in Varaždin, Croatia in 2016.

CBS Radio Mystery Theater made an adaptation of The Parasite, which originally aired April 7, 1978.
