= Genetics in fiction =

Genetics as a theme in fiction

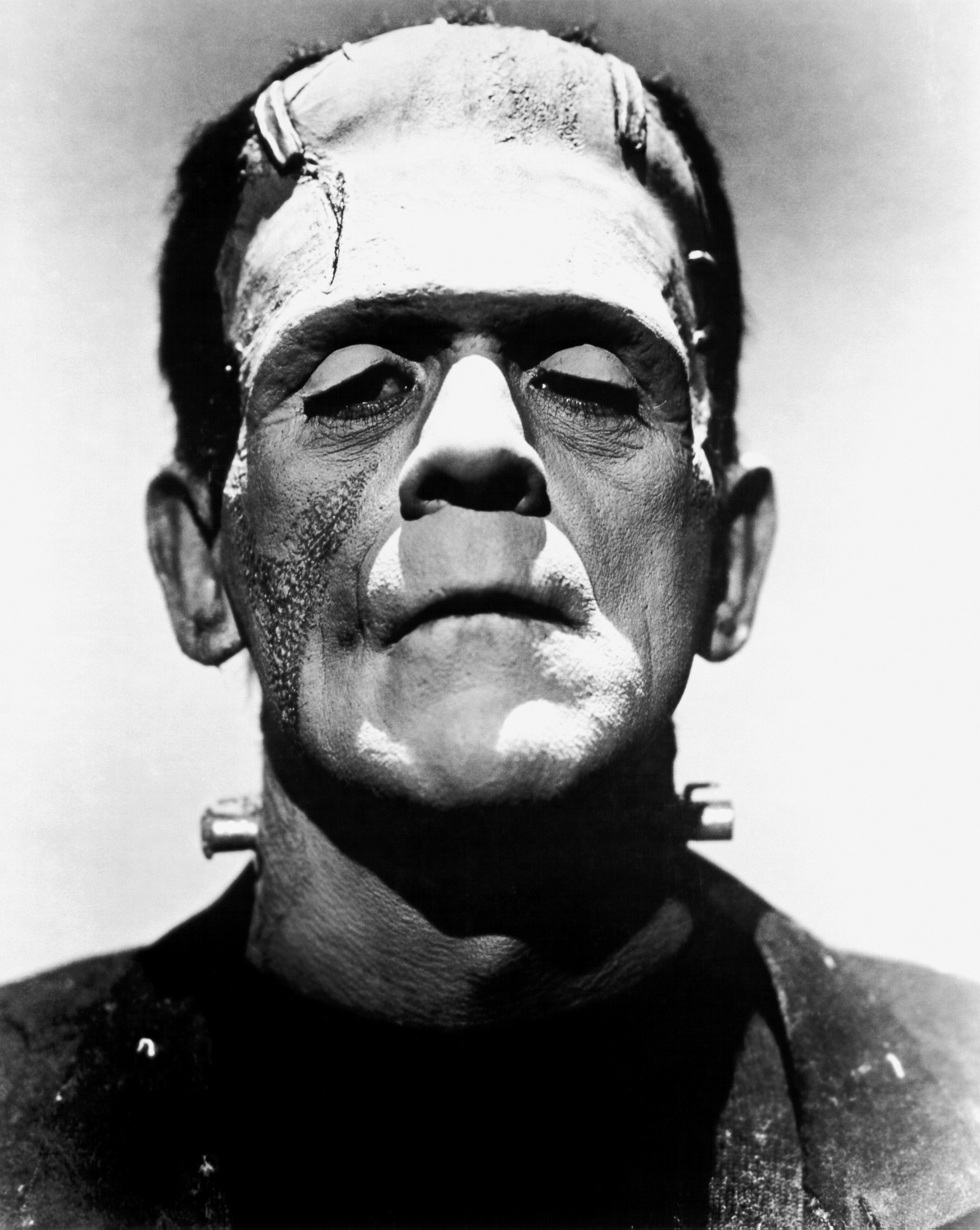
Boris Karloff in James Whale's 1931 film Frankenstein, based on Mary Shelley's 1818 novel. The monster is created by an unorthodox scientific experiment.

Aspects of genetics including mutation, hybridisation, cloning, genetic engineering, and eugenics have appeared in fiction since the 19th century.

Genetics is a young science, having started in 1900 with the rediscovery of Gregor Mendel's study on the inheritance of traits in pea plants. During the 20th century it developed to create new sciences and technologies including molecular biology, DNA sequencing, cloning, and genetic engineering. The ethical implications were brought into focus with the eugenics movement.

Since then, many science fiction novels and films have used aspects of genetics as plot devices, often taking one of two routes: a genetic accident with disastrous consequences; or, the feasibility and desirability of a planned genetic alteration. The treatment of science in these stories has been uneven and often unrealistic. The film Gattaca did attempt to portray science accurately but was criticised by scientists.

== Background ==
The 1953 discovery of the double helix chemical structure of DNA transformed genetics and launched the science of molecular biology.

Modern genetics began with the work of the monk Gregor Mendel in the 19th century, on the inheritance of traits in pea plants. Mendel found that visible traits, such as whether peas were round or wrinkled, were inherited discretely, rather than by blending the attributes of the two parents. In 1900, Hugo de Vries and other scientists rediscovered Mendel's research; William Bateson coined the term "genetics" for the new science, which soon investigated a wide range of phenomena including mutation (inherited changes caused by damage to the genetic material), genetic linkage (when some traits are to some extent inherited together), and hybridisation (crosses of different species).

Eugenics, the production of better human beings by selective breeding, was named and advocated by Charles Darwin's cousin, the scientist Francis Galton, in 1883. It had both a positive aspect, the breeding of more children with high intelligence and good health; and a negative aspect, aiming to suppress "race degeneration" by preventing supposedly "defective" families with attributes such as profligacy, laziness, immoral behaviour and a tendency to criminality from having children.

Molecular biology, the interactions and regulation of genetic materials, began with the identification in 1944 of DNA as the main genetic material; the genetic code and the double helix structure of DNA was determined by James Watson and Francis Crick in 1953. DNA sequencing, the identification of an exact sequence of genetic information in an organism, was developed in 1977 by Frederick Sanger.

Genetic engineering, the modification of the genetic material of a live organism, became possible in 1972 when Paul Berg created the first recombinant DNA molecules (artificially assembled genetic material) using viruses.

Cloning, the production of genetically identical organisms from some chosen starting point, was shown to be practicable in a mammal with the creation of Dolly the sheep from an ordinary body cell in 1996 at the Roslin Institute.

== Genetics themes ==
=== Mutants and hybrids ===
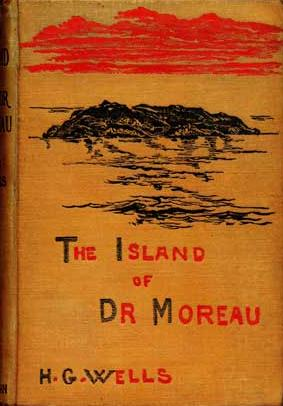
H. G. Wells's 1896 The Island of Dr Moreau imagined the use of hybridisation to create human-like hybrid beings.

Mutation and hybridisation are widely used in fiction, starting in the 19th century with science fiction works such as Mary Shelley's 1818 novel Frankenstein and H. G. Wells's 1896 The Island of Dr. Moreau.

In her 1977 Biological Themes in Modern Science Fiction, Helen Parker identified two major types of story: "genetic accident", the uncontrolled, unexpected and disastrous alteration of a species; and "planned genetic alteration", whether controlled by humans or aliens, and the question of whether that would be either feasible or desirable. In science fiction up to the 1970s, the genetic changes were brought about by radiation, breeding programmes, or manipulation with chemicals or surgery (and thus, notes Lars Schmeink, not necessarily by strictly genetic means). Examples include The Island of Dr. Moreau with its horrible manipulations; Aldous Huxley's 1932 Brave New World with a breeding programme; and John Taine's 1951 Seeds of Life, using radiation to create supermen. After the discovery of the double helix and then recombinant DNA, genetic engineering became the focus for genetics in fiction, as in books like Brian Stableford's tale of a genetically modified society in his 1998 Inherit the Earth, or Michael Marshall Smith's story of Organ farming in his 1997 Spares.

Comic books have imagined mutated superhumans with extraordinary powers. The DC Universe (from 1939) imagines "metahumans"; the Marvel Universe (from 1961) calls them "mutants", while the Wildstorm (from 1992) and Ultimate Marvel (2000–2015) Universes name them "posthumans". Stan Lee introduced the concept of mutants in the Marvel X-Men books in 1963; the villain Magneto declares his plan to "make Homo sapiens bow to Homo superior!", implying that mutants will be an evolutionary step up from current humanity. Later, the books speak of an X-gene that confers powers from puberty onwards. X-men powers include telepathy, telekinesis, healing, strength, flight, time travel, and the ability to emit blasts of energy. Marvel's god-like Celestials are later (1999) said to have visited Earth long ago and to have modified human DNA to enable mutant powers.

James Blish's 1952 novel Titan's Daughter (in Kendell Foster Crossen's Future Tense collection) featured stimulated polyploidy (giving organisms multiple sets of genetic material, something that can create new species in a single step), based on spontaneous polyploidy in flowering plants, to create humans with more than normal height, strength, and lifespans.

=== Cloning ===
Steven Spielberg's 1993 film Jurassic Park portrayed the recreation of dinosaurs from cloned fossil DNA.

Cloning, too, is a familiar plot device. Aldous Huxley's 1931 dystopian novel Brave New World imagines the in vitro cloning of fertilised human eggs. Huxley was influenced by J. B. S. Haldane's 1924 non-fiction book Daedalus; or, Science and the Future, which used the Greek myth of Daedalus to symbolise the coming revolution in genetics; Haldane predicted that humans would control their own evolution through directed mutation and in vitro fertilisation. Cloning was explored further in stories such as Poul Anderson's 1953 UN-Man. In his 1976 novel, The Boys from Brazil, Ira Levin describes the creation of 96 clones of Adolf Hitler, replicating for all of them the rearing of Hitler (including the death of his father at age 13), with the goal of resurrecting Nazism. In his 1990 novel Jurassic Park, Michael Crichton imagined the recovery of the complete genome of a dinosaur from fossil remains, followed by its use to recreate living animals of an extinct species.

Cloning is a recurring theme in science fiction films like Jurassic Park (1993), Alien Resurrection (1997), The 6th Day (2000), Resident Evil (2002), Star Wars: Episode II (2002) and The Island (2005). The process of cloning is represented variously in fiction. Many works depict the artificial creation of humans by a method of growing cells from a tissue or DNA sample; the replication may be instantaneous, or take place through slow growth of human embryos in artificial wombs. In the long-running British television series Doctor Who, the Fourth Doctor and his companion Leela were cloned in a matter of seconds from DNA samples ("The Invisible Enemy", 1977) and then—in an apparent homage to the 1966 film Fantastic Voyage—shrunk to microscopic size in order to enter the Doctor's body to combat an alien virus. The clones in this story are short-lived, and can only survive a matter of minutes before they expire. Films such as The Matrix and Star Wars: Episode II – Attack of the Clones have featured human foetuses being cultured on an industrial scale in enormous tanks.

Cloning humans from body parts is a common science fiction trope, one of several genetics themes parodied in Woody Allen's 1973 comedy Sleeper, where an attempt is made to clone an assassinated dictator from his disembodied nose.

=== Genetic engineering ===
Genetic engineering features in many science fiction stories. Films such as The Island (2005) and Blade Runner (1982) bring the engineered creature to confront the person who created it or the being it was cloned from, a theme seen in some film versions of Frankenstein. Few films have informed audiences about genetic engineering as such, with the exception of the 1978 The Boys from Brazil and the 1993 Jurassic Park, both of which made use of a lesson, a demonstration, and a clip of scientific film. In 1982, Frank Herbert's novel The White Plague described the deliberate use of genetic engineering to create a pathogen which specifically killed women. Another of Herbert's creations, the Dune series of novels, starting with Dune in 1965, emphasises genetics. It combines selective breeding by a powerful sisterhood, the Bene Gesserit, to produce a supernormal male being, the Kwisatz Haderach, with the genetic engineering of the powerful but despised Tleilaxu.

=== Eugenics ===
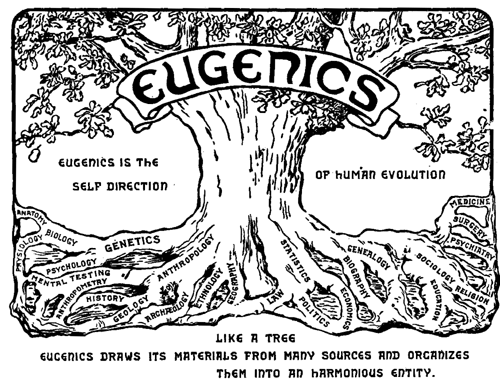
1921 conference logo, depicting eugenics as a tree uniting many fields

Eugenics plays a central role in films such as Andrew Niccol's 1997 Gattaca, the title alluding to the letters G, A, T, C for guanine, adenine, thymine, and cytosine, the four nucleobases of DNA. Genetic engineering of humans is unrestricted, resulting in genetic discrimination, loss of diversity, and adverse effects on society. The film explores the ethical implications; the production company, Sony Pictures, consulted with a gene therapy researcher, French Anderson, to ensure that the portrayal of science was realistic, and test-screened the film with the Society of Mammalian Cell Biologists and the American National Human Genome Research Institute before its release. This care did not prevent researchers from attacking the film after its release. Philim Yam of Scientific American called it "science bashing"; in Nature Kevin Davies called it a "surprisingly pedestrian affair"; and the molecular biologist Lee Silver described the film's extreme genetic determinism as "a straw man".

== Myth and oversimplification ==
The geneticist Dan Koboldt observes that while science and technology play major roles in fiction, from fantasy and science fiction to thrillers, the representation of science in both literature and film is often unrealistic. In Koboldt's view, genetics in fiction is frequently oversimplified, and some myths are common and need to be debunked. For example, the Human Genome Project has not (he states) immediately led to a Gattaca world, as the relationship between genotype and phenotype is not straightforward. People do differ genetically, but only very rarely because they are missing a gene that other people have: people have different alleles of the same genes. Eye and hair colour are controlled not by one gene each, but by multiple genes. Mutations do occur, but they are rare: people are 99.99% identical genetically, the 3 million differences between any two people being dwarfed by the hundreds of millions of DNA bases which are identical; nearly all DNA variants are inherited, not acquired afresh by mutation. And, Koboldt writes, believable scientists in fiction should know their knowledge is limited.

== See also ==
- Evolution in fiction
- Category:Fiction about genetic engineering
- Parasites in fiction
