= The Canopy of Time =

1959 novel by Brian Aldiss

- Author: Brian Aldiss
- Cover artist: John Griffiths
- Language: English
- Genre: Science fiction
- Published: 1959 (Faber and Faber)
- Publication place: United Kingdom
- Media type: Print (Hardback)
- Pages: 222 (Hardback edition)
- OCLC: 1933121

The Canopy of Time is a collection of science fiction previously published short stories by English writer Brian W. Aldiss, first published in 1959 by Faber and Faber. The book was published in the United States (in an alternate form which Aldiss preferred) as Galaxies Like Grains of Sand.

== Short stories ==
- "Three’s a Cloud" - first appeared in New Worlds Science Fiction #79 (January 1959), as "The Unbeaten Track"
- "All the World’s Tears" - Nebula Science Fiction #21 (May 1957)
- "Who Can Replace a Man?" - Infinite Science Fiction (June 1958)
- "Blighted Profile" - Science Fantasy v10, #29 (Jun 1958)
- "Judas Danced" - Star Science Fiction (USA, January 1958) and Science Fantasy v9, #27 (UK, Feb 1958)
- "O, Ishrail!" - New Worlds Science Fiction #58 (April 1957)
- "Incentive" - New Worlds Science Fiction #78 (Dec 1958)
- "Gene-Hive" - Nebula Science Fiction #30 (May 1958), as Journey to the Interior
- "Secret of a Mighty City" - The Magazine of Fantasy and Science Fiction (May 1958), as "Have Your Hatreds Ready"
- "They Shall Inherit" - Nebula Science Fiction #32 (July 1958)
- "Visiting Amoeba" - Authentic Science Fiction #82 (July 1957)

== Plot ==
Aldiss describes historical time as “a treacherous mirror, reflecting only our limited truths.” The mirror reflecting the forty-million year history of the City of New Union has been shattered and the book presents only a handful of its shards. A brief introduction ties each story to the previous one:

- "Three’s a Cloud" - Mildly drunk, Clemperer wanders into a restaurant in the seaside town into which he has washed up. The restaurant is nearly empty, but Clemperer sits down with the two other occupants and starts a conversation. He feels an odd gestalt with them, one that persists as a storm rages over Union Bay. Believing his new friends drowned, he goes to the restaurant and finds them, soaking wet, waiting for him.
- "All the World's Tears" - On the last day of summer at the end of the 83rd Century (AD 8300 Dec 18), in a war-exhausted world in which people avoid direct contact, J. Smithlao goes to Charles Gunpat's estate to give the old man a hate brace in preparation for a meeting. As his sneering comments about Gunpat's mutant daughter goad the man into a screaming rage, Smithlao witnesses an incident that will offer excellent material for the next time he is called to give Charles Gunpat a hate brace.
- "Who Can Replace a Man?" - One day the robots working on a vast farm receive no orders from the city. They are informed that the humans are extinct. Guided by the most intelligent of them, the robots begin planning to create a glorious robot civilization, free of human domination. Then they encounter a lone human.
- "Blighted Profile" - Chun Hwa rides his horse along the rim of one of the last burnt-over remnants of ancient radiation wars. His grandchildren's generation is planning a great city on Union Bay and he wants to go to the future to gather evidence that it is a mistake. A wild boy tells Chun Hwa that he has found a time machine such as the old man desires and Chun Hwa follows his heart.
- "Judas Danced" - In the city of Union, Alexander Abel Ybo has been sentenced to death for the second time for murdering Parowen Scryban for the second time. In a world where people view history through timescreens and express their feelings about it through interpretive dance, he is an outcast. Even though he looks like Jesus Christ, his club foot prevents him from dancing the Passion, so he murders his twin, who does.
- "O, Ishrail!" - Aboard the mental-health ship Cyberqueen, anchored in the harbor of New Union, Davi Dael pleads the case of a man called Ishrail. The man was found naked on a farm and claims to be an exile from a galaxy-wide civilization. No one on Earth has heard of such a civilization, though records, likely myths, indicate that some ships attempted to cross interstellar space millennia before. Ishrail is declared insane and Davi recognizes the exquisite cruelty of the people who exiled him.
- "Incentive" - A bit over a decade after Ishrail's exile began, the Galactics have come to Earth and established an embassy in New Union. Farro Westerby has gone to that embassy to confront Jandanagger Laterobinson and try to discern the real reason that Earth is being admitted into the Galactic Federation. Jandanagger acquaints Farro with the Galactics’ immaterialist understanding of Reality and notes that Earth is being drawn into the Federation as an act of psychotherapy, an exorcising of monsters from the Id.
- "Gene-Hive" - A nuclear accident triggers a change in one man's body, making one of his cells sentient. The rogue cell renders other cells sentient and transforms the man into a shapeshifter, the next stage in the evolution of life. The man begins to absorb other people and when unaffected humans approach him with atomic weapons, he merges with a mass migration of butterflies and vanishes.
- "Secret of a Mighty City" - In a projection room of Supernova Studios Harsch Benlin pitches to Smile P. Wreyermeyer an idea for a 3-D movie about the City of Nunion itself. It is an exploration of the city's decadence with its undertone of squalor, a search for the heart and soul of the greatest city in the Galaxy. Of course, the final product looks nothing like what Harsch Benlin pitched. It does not even mention the destitute artist who conceived it.
- "They Shall Inherit" - Representing Transfederation Health, Citizen Djjckett Male has come to the Experimental Applied Mutation Hospital to confer with Moderator Tedden Male regarding experiments aimed at advancing human development. Djjckett, whose own people make and use creatures that are part robot and part animal, claims that artificial mutation of humans is monstrous. The mutants seem to agree.
- "Visiting Amoeba" - An itinerant peddler strays beyond the Galaxy and must land on a nearby planet to replenish his ship's oxygen supply. Although the instruments say that the world is safe, the air kills him just as a manlike creature emerges from a lake. After absorbing all knowledge from the peddler's ship and library, the creature flies the ship back into the Galaxy, raises an invasion fleet, and heads for Earth. In the fabulous city of Nion, the creature tells the Supreme Suzerain that matter has grown tired: exhausted, it is beginning to collapse back into the nothingness whence it came, making room for a new creation.

== Reception ==
Floyd C. Gale described the book as "a Stapletonesque (sic) Long View of Man's future".

== Sources ==
- Barron, Neil (2004). Anatomy of Wonder: A Critical Guide to Science Fiction, 5th Edition. Westport, CT: Libraries Unlimited. Pg 92. ISBN 1-59158-171-0.
- Clute, John, and David Pringle. "Aldiss, Brian W." The Encyclopedia of Science Fiction. Eds. John Clute, David Langford, Peter Nicholls and Graham Sleight. Gollancz, 2 Sept. 2016. Web. 11 Oct. 2016.
- Tuck, Donald H. (1974). The Encyclopedia of Science Fiction and Fantasy. Chicago: Advent. pg. 4. ISBN 0-911682-20-1.
