= For a Breath I Tarry =

1966 novelette by Roger Zelazny

"For a Breath I Tarry" is a 1966 post-apocalyptic novelette by American writer Roger Zelazny, which was nominated for the Hugo Award for Best Novelette in 1967. Set in a future long after the self-extinction of humanity, the novelette recounts the tale of Frost, a sentient machine. Although humans have caused their own extinction, the sentient machines that they created continue the work of rebuilding a shattered Earth.

Along the way, the story explores the differences between humanity and machines, the former experiencing the world qualitatively, while the latter doing so quantitatively. This difference is illustrated through philosophical conversations between Frost and another machine named Mordel.

Frost's goal of becoming human, along with literary allusions, drives the plot and sets the tone of the novelette. These allusions include the first chapter of the Book of Job, in both situation and language, since verses are both quoted directly and paraphrased. In addition, the first three chapters of the Book of Genesis are echoed. Finally, Frost and Mordel enter into a Faustian bargain, though with better results than in the original story.

The other major character is the Beta Machine, Frost's peer in the Southern Hemisphere. (Frost controls the Northern Hemisphere.) The novelette hints that though being a machine, Beta has a feminine personality. After Frost has succeeded in his millennium-long quest to become human (via recovered DNA), Beta agrees to join him in becoming human—suggesting the possibility of rebirth for the human race.

The novelette has appeared in collections of Zelazny's works and in anthologies.

The title is from a phrase in the poet A. E. Housman's collection A Shropshire Lad.
