= The Last Defender of Camelot (short story) =

- Short story by Roger Zelazny
- Cover by Lela Dowling for the Underwood/Miller chapbook publication (1980)
- Country: United States
- Language: English
- Genre: Fantasy

Publication
- Published in: Asimov's SF Adventure Magazine
- Publisher: Davis Publications
- Media type: Print (Periodical & Chapbook)
- Publication date: 1979

"The Last Defender of Camelot" is a fantasy short story by American writer Roger Zelazny, first published in the Summer 1979 issue of Asimov's SF Adventure Magazine. The story was subsequently published as a chapbook by Underwood/Miller for the 1980 V-Con 8 convention, where Zelazny was a guest of honor. The story is currently published as a hardcover, paperback, and e-book by Amber Books Ltd. The story was also the basis for a 1986 episode of the television series The Twilight Zone.

== Plot ==
The story concerns Lancelot who has survived to the present day by means of magic. He must help Morgana le Fay confront Merlin, who is half-mad and attempting to meddle in the affairs of the world.

Lancelot has remained alive since the fall of Camelot, having the appearance of an elderly man but retaining his strength and fighting skills. He has spent his long life seeking the Holy Grail, believing that his immortality is punishment for his sins, and that finding the Grail will end his curse. Lancelot instead learns from Morgana that Merlin is responsible for his condition. Merlin has slept for centuries, but is about to awaken, and intends for Lancelot to be his champion and protector. Morgana warns Lancelot that Merlin will cause great harm in his misguided attempts to right the wrongs of the modern world, and that he must be stopped.

Lancelot finds Merlin and rejuvenates him from his centuries-long sleep with a magic elixir. Lancelot tries to persuade Merlin to desist from his plans, and Merlin removes his spell of immortality from Lancelot. Anticipating Merlin, Lancelot drinks the remainder of the elixir to restore his own youth. Merlin summons a "hollow knight" (a suit of armor animated by a spirit) to kill Lancelot. Morgana defeats Merlin, and Lancelot vanquishes the spirit, but is mortally wounded. As Lancelot dies, he finally sees a vision of the Holy Grail.

== Awards and nominations ==
The story won the 1980 Balrog Award for short fiction.

== Adaptations ==
In 1986, the story was adapted as an episode of The Twilight Zone television series.

The story was adapted as a comic in 1993. Both the adaptation and the illustration were done by James B. Zimmerman.

== Sources ==
- Levack, Daniel J. H. (1983). Amber Dreams: A Roger Zelazny Bibliography. San Francisco: Underwood/Miller. pp. 48–49, 108. ISBN 0-934438-39-0.
