= Mara (demon) =

Personifications of evil in Buddhism

Translations of Māra
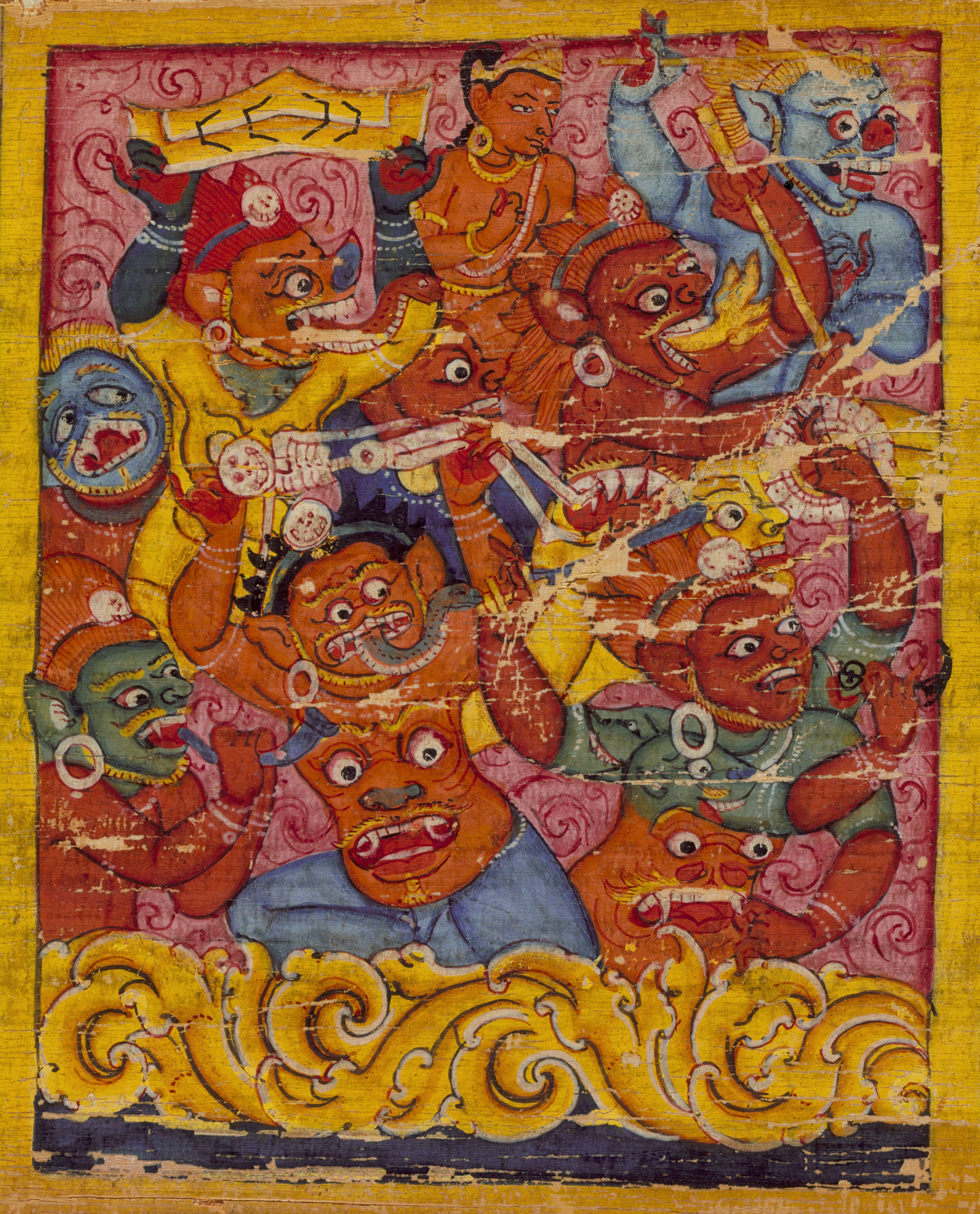
- The demons of Mara, palm leaf manuscript, Nalanda, Bihar
- English: Mara; Demon
- Sanskrit: मार, Māra
- Pali: Māra
- Burmese: မာရ်နတ် (MLCTS: Marnat)
- Chinese: 天魔; 魔羅; 魔罗 (Pinyin: Tiānmó; Móluó; Móluó)
- Indonesian: Mara; Setan; Iblis
- Japanese: 魔羅; マーラ; 天魔 (Rōmaji: Mara; Māra; Tenma)
- Khmer: មារ (UNGEGN: Méru)
- Korean: 마라 (RR: Mara)
- Sinhala: මාරයා (Mārayā)
- Tibetan: བདུད (Wylie: bdud)
- Thai: มาร (RTGS: Māra)
- Vietnamese: Thiên Ma

Mara, (Note: Sanskrit: मार, Māra; Sinhala: මාරයා; Chinese: 天魔; pinyin: Tiānmó or traditional Chinese: 魔羅; simplified Chinese: 魔罗; pinyin: Móluó; Japanese: 魔羅, romanized: Mara; also マーラ, Māra or 天魔, Tenma; Korean: 마라, romanized: Mara; Vietnamese: Thiên Ma; Tibetan Wylie: bdud; Khmer: មារ; Burmese: မာရ်နတ်; Thai: มาร; Tagalog: Mara) in Buddhism, refers to any form of malicious force hindering enlightenment. Both demonic as well as celestial beings are part of Saṃsāra and hence, considered to be under Māra's influence, if they do not follow the message of the Buddha.

In the story of the Awakening of Prince Siddhartha Māra appears as a powerful deva, trying to seduce him with his celestial army and a vision of beautiful maidens (accharā) who, in various legends, are often said to be Mara's daughters. In other iterations, Māra is inspired by Hindu myths about asuras, a class of titans or lesser deities.

In Buddhist cosmology, Mara is associated with death, rebirth and desire. Nyanaponika Thera has described Mara as "the personification of the forces antagonistic to enlightenment."

== Origin ==
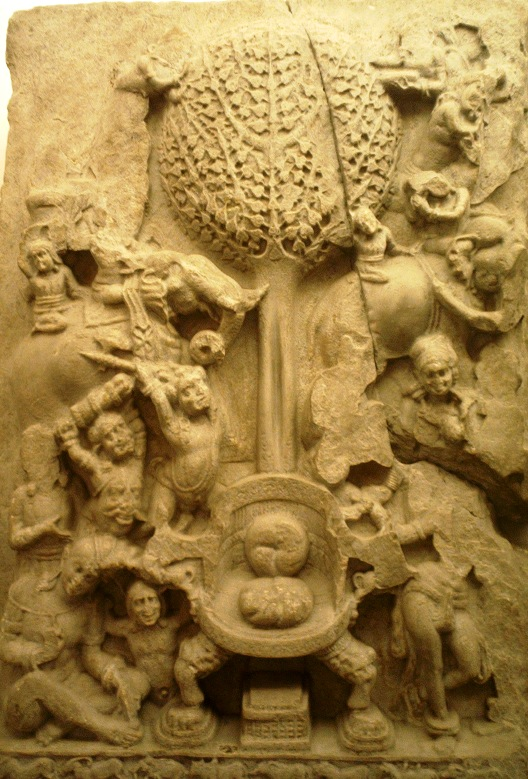
Mara's assault on the Buddha (an aniconic representation: the Buddha is only symbolized by his throne), 2nd century, Amaravati Stupa, India

His name is first mentioned in the Atharva Veda (1200 BCE–1000 BCE) as Mrtyu and Agha Mara, the evil slayer. He is called the "evil one who kills" and "Papiyan", denoting a being which is not only morally bad but intertwined with sorrow, pain and misfortune.

While Mara's origin is of Hindu nature, the development of the symbolism of Mara was spread by Buddhism.

== Etymology ==
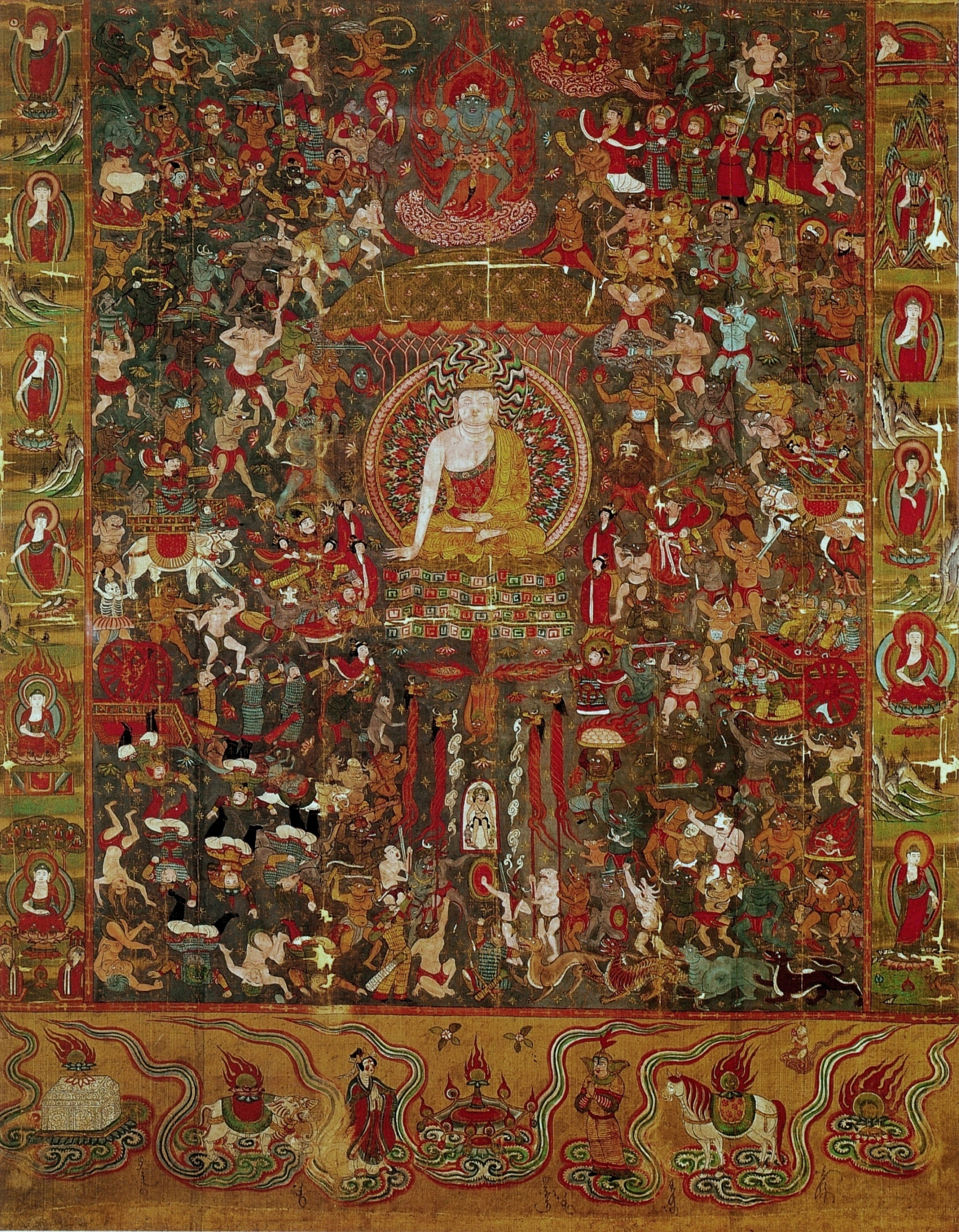
Mara, his lustful daughters, and demonic army, attempting to tempt Buddha, on a 10th-century icon from Mogao Caves

The word Māra comes from the Sanskrit form of the verbal root mṛ. It takes a present indicative form mṛyate and a causative form mārayati (with strengthening of the root vowel from ṛ to ār). Māra is a verbal noun from the causative root and means 'causing death' or 'killing'. It is related to other words for death from the same root, such as: maraṇa and mṛtyu. The latter is a name for death personified and is sometimes identified with Yama.

The root mṛ is related to the Indo-European verbal root *mer meaning "die, disappear" in the context of "death, murder or destruction". It is "very wide-spread" in Indo-European languages suggesting it to be of great antiquity, according to Mallory and Adams.

== Four types of Māra ==
In traditional Buddhism, four metaphorical forms of Māra are given:

- Kleśa-māra – Māra as the embodiment of all unskillful emotions, such as greed, hate and delusion.
- Mṛtyu-māra – Māra as death.
- Skandha-māra – Māra as metaphor for the entirety of conditioned existence.
- Devaputra-māra – the deva of the sensuous realm, who tried to prevent Gautama Buddha from attaining liberation from the cycle of rebirth on the night of the Buddha's enlightenment.

== Character ==
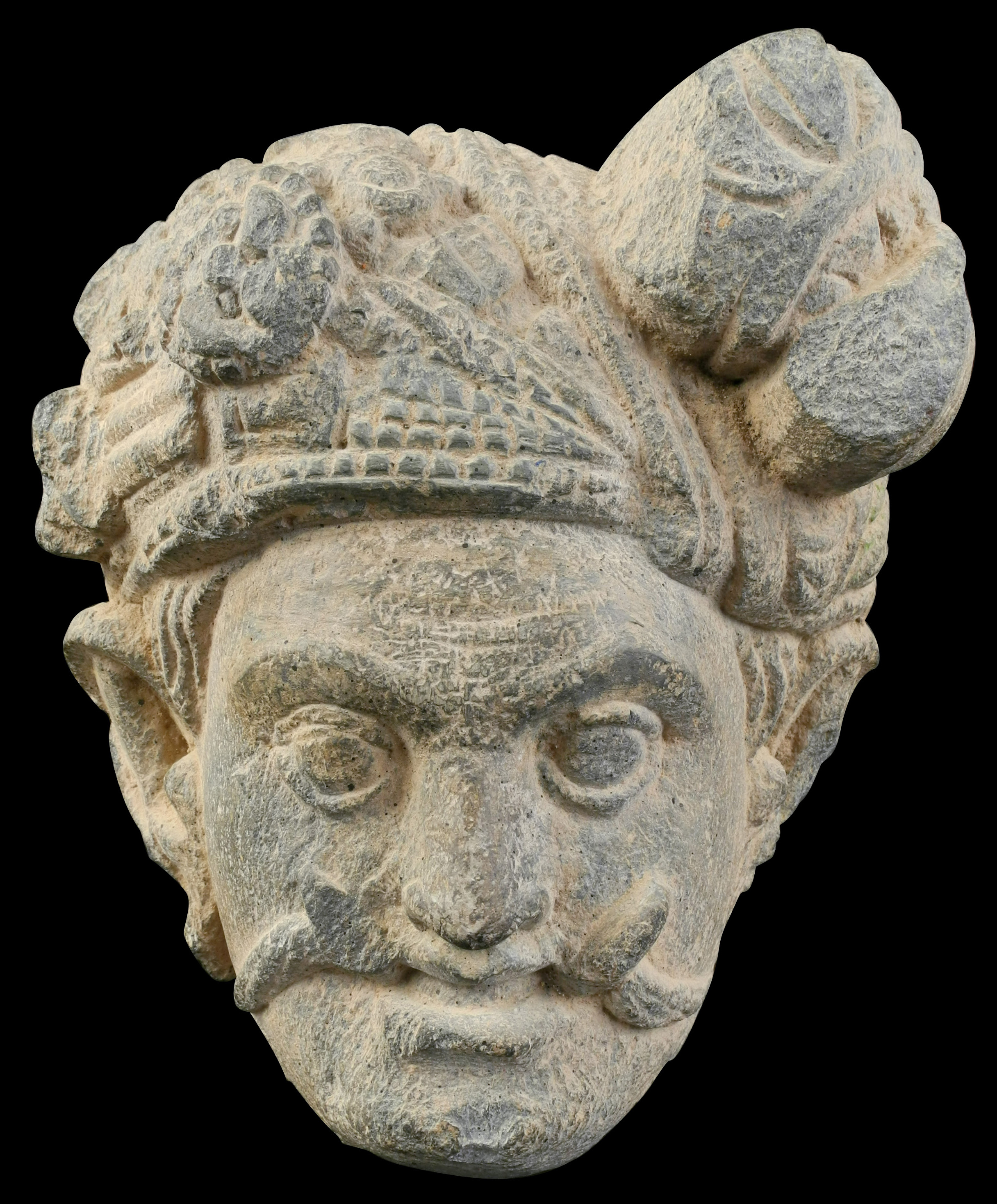
Relief fragment of Mara in Gandhara style, found in Swat Valley

Early Buddhism acknowledged both a literal and psychological interpretation of Mara.

Mara is described both as an entity having an existence in Kāma-world, just as are shown existing around the Buddha, and also is described in pratītyasamutpāda as, primarily, the guardian of passion and the catalyst for lust, hesitation and fear that obstructs meditation among Buddhists. The Denkōroku refers to him as the "One Who Delights in Destruction", which highlights his nature as a deity among the Parinirmitavaśavarti devas.

"Buddha defying Mara" is a common pose of Buddha sculptures. The Buddha is shown with his left hand in his lap, palm facing upwards and his right hand on his right knee. The fingers of his right hand touch the earth, to call the earth as his witness for defying Mara and achieving enlightenment. This posture is also referred to as the bhūmisparśa "earth-witness" mudra.

In certain Sri Lankan traditions, the mount of Mara is said to be Girimekhala, a gargantuan elephant with black hide, and reaching 250 yojana in height.

=== Three daughters ===
In some accounts of the Buddha's enlightenment, it is said that the demon Māra did not send his three daughters to tempt but instead they came willingly after Māra's setback in his endeavor to eliminate the Buddha's quest for enlightenment. Mara's three daughters are identified as Taṇhā (Thirst), Arati (Aversion, Discontentment), and Rāga (Attachment, Desire, Greed, Passion). For example, in the Samyutta Nikaya's Māra-saṃyutta, Mara's three daughters were undressing in front of the Buddha; but failed to entice him:

They had come to him glittering with beauty –
Taṇhā, Arati, and Rāga –
But the Teacher swept them away right there
As the wind, a fallen cotton tuft.

The three daughters of Māra were inspired by Aratis, a type of feminine goblin that was associated with avarice.

=== The Great Brahma and the delusion of eternity ===
According to the Buddhist view, Mara's influence extends into the non-sensual world of God(s) (Brahmāloka). While lower worlds fall into the traps of Mara by giving in to sensual desire, the abode of Brahma is free from such temptation. However, they crave (Taṇhā) eternity, and are ignorant (Aavidyā) of the impermanence of all conditioned existence. As such, the Brahma, and thus the very concept of God, is associated with Mara's delusions, a criticism of the pre-Buddhist Brahmanical theistic beliefs.

While the Brahmanical texts extoll the sanctity and necessity for men to engage in procreation and family life in order to achieve pleasure and symbolic immortality, it is Mara who encourages to rejoice in the goods of life and concealing the impermanent nature of such things. Mara tempts the Buddha "A man with sons delights in sons, one with cattle delights in cattle. Attachments truly are a man's delight; without attachments one does not delight." Thereby, the Mara keeps the wheel of life spinning and fosters further rebirths. The Buddha's response unravels the true nature of attachment as a seed of sorrow, replying that these things are actually causes of grief (socati) and those who avoid them will avoid grief.

The alignment of the God(s) with Mara's view is made explicit in various discussions between the Buddha and a Brahma. When confronting Baka Brahma, the God extols the heavenly kingdom he has created, that he believes to be eternal and unchanging in nature. However, the Buddha explains that Baka Brahma has become ignorant of the conditions which led to his rebirth as a brahmā, and teaches the deity about his past and future, and how his long life will eventually come to an end once the conditions expire, and his kingdom will decay.

In another encounter between the Buddha and God, in the Brahmanimantanika Sutta, Mara speaks through a lesser brahmā at the Great Brahmā's assembly. Here it is not the belief in eternity which is criticized, but obedience to the theistic deity. The assembly member warns the Buddha that many individuals before him have opposed the Great Brahma, and as a result, were sent to hell as he would remain under the God's dominion. The Buddha, however, exposes Mara's influence, and Mara retreats. In order to demonstrate the limitations of the Great Brahma, the Buddha announces to disappear from the allegedly omniscient God and travels through a realm, which the Great Brahma can neither see nor know. As a result, the Great Brahma admits defeat and admits the Buddha's superiority.

While the latter story is not a criticism of the belief in eternity per se, it criticizes adherence to an allegedly omnipotent theistic deity, and discourages the belief in a creator deity and creation as parts of Mara's schemes. The implicit argument brought forth describes a God as a conditioned being and hence as something which will ultimately perish and cannot possess true authority nor can it determine destiny of the afterlife.

=== Mara's conversion ===
The Jingde Record of the Transmission of the Lamp and the Denkoroku both contain a story of Mara's conversion to Buddhism under the auspices of the monk Upagupta.

According to the story, Upagupta journeyed to the kingdom of Mathura and preached the Dharma with great success. This caused Mara's palace to tremble, prompting the deity to use his destructive powers against the Dharma. When Upagupta entered samadhi, Mara approached him and slipped a jade necklace around his neck.

Upagupta reciprocated by transforming the corpses of a man, a dog, and a snake into a garland and gifted it to Mara. When Mara discovered the true nature of the gift, he sought the help of Brahma to remove it. Brahma informed him that because the necklace was bestowed by an advanced disciple of the Buddha, its effects could only be assuaged by taking refuge in Upagupta.

Mara returned to the human world where he prostrated before the monk and repented. At Upagupta's recommendation, he vowed never to do harm to the Dharma and took refuge in the Three Jewels.

== In popular culture ==
Mara appears in Roger Zelazny's 1967 novel Lord of Light as a god of illusion.

Mara has appeared as a recurring Demon in the Megami Tensei franchise, as well as in its spinoffs. Here, Mara takes the appearance of a giant penis riding a golden chariot. Mara has consistently been one of the most popular demons in the series, even reaching #1 popularity on some demon popularity polls.

In 2020, the singer-songwriter Jack Garratt released a song entitled "Mara". Inspired by the story of Mara's distraction of the Buddha, "Mara" describes Garratt's experience of intrusive thoughts.

== Sources ==
- Bodhi, Bhikkhu (trans.) (2000). The Connected Discourses of the Buddha: A Translation of the Samyutta Nikaya. Boston: Wisdom Publications. ISBN 0-86171-331-1.
- Saddhatissa, H. (trans.) (1998). The Sutta-Nipāta. London: RoutledgeCurzon Press. ISBN 0-7007-0181-8.
