= This Immortal =

1965 novel by Roger Zelazny

"...And Call Me Conrad"
- Short story by Roger Zelazny
- Country: United States
- Language: English
- Genre: Science fiction

Publication
- Published in: The Magazine of Fantasy and Science Fiction
- Publication type: Magazine
- Publisher: Mercury Press
- Media type: Print (Periodical)
- Publication date: October and November 1965

This Immortal
- Cover of the first edition
- Author: Roger Zelazny
- Cover artist: Gray Morrow
- Language: English
- Genre: Science fiction
- Publisher: Ace Books
- Publication date: July 1966
- Publication place: United States
- Media type: Print (Paperback)
- Pages: 174
- Awards: Hugo Award for Best Novel (1966); Seiun Award for Best Translated Long Work (1976)

This Immortal, serialized as ...And Call Me Conrad, is a science fiction novel by American author Roger Zelazny. For its original publication, it was abridged by the editor and published in two parts in The Magazine of Fantasy and Science Fiction in October and November 1965. It was a joint winner (with Frank Herbert's Dune) of the 1966 Hugo Award for Best Novel.

== Publication history ==
Most but not all of the edits made for the serialized version were restored for the first paperback publication by Ace Books and the title was changed by the publisher to This Immortal. Zelazny stated in interviews that he preferred the original eponymous title. The abridged version was novel length at over 47,000 words; the paperback version was over 58,000 words after the cuts were restored. However, it was not until a book club version was published in the 1980s that Zelazny realized that some cuts had not been restored to the book version; thus, earlier publications of This Immortal were still not complete. The abridged magazine version also contains 10 paragraphs of text not in the book version, starting from "And the long-dormant Radpol was stirring again, but I did not know that until several days later" and ending with "The days of Karaghiosis had passed." Also, the "Synopsis of Part One" that appeared in the November 1965 issue of F&SF (immediately prior to Part Two) is written in the first person and contains material about Conrad's character and backstory that is not in the main text of ...And Call Me Conrad nor the 1980s restored version of This Immortal.

== Plot summary ==
After being devastated by a nuclear war, the Earth is a planet with a population of only 4 million, overrun by a variety of mutated lifeforms. Worse, much of the Earth is now owned by the Vegans, a race of blue-skinned aliens who see the planet as a tourist location. Conrad Nomikos, the first person narrator, is a man with a past which he would rather not talk about who has been given a task which he would rather refuse: to show an influential Vegan named Cort Myshtigo around the old ruins of Earth. Thanks to an unusual mutation (he laughingly calls himself a changeling), Conrad is well over a hundred years old, but he hides this fact by faking his death and changing identities over the years. It is clear that Myshtigo's survey of ancient Earth is a cover for his real mission, which is unknown. Conrad becomes his reluctant protector.

Conrad then finds himself playing nursemaid to a group of tourists in addition to Myshtigo: Don dos Santos, the nominal leader of a group who want to take Earth back from the Vegans and are willing to use violent means to do so; his consort Diane (also referred to as Red Wig), the real leader of the resistance; Dos Santos' bodyguard, the master assassin Hasan, who knew Conrad under a different name; Earth's Poet Laureate Phil, an old friend of Conrad's; and George and Ellen Emmets, a married pair of scientists conducting research (with Ellen a previous lover of Conrad). They plan to visit the ancient ruins of Earth, beginning with Greece and Egypt.

The group has a run-in with a cannibal tribe and several close encounters with mutated and dangerous lifeforms. There are also several accidents which may or may not been attempts to assassinate Myshtigo. Conrad learns that Don and Diane have received intelligence stating Myshtigo must be killed, and have hired Hasan to do so. But their instructions do not say why, and as Myshtigo's real mission is unclear, Conrad continues to protect him. Myshtigo is horrified to learn that Conrad is having the pyramids of Egypt torn down to provide building material for new construction. Conrad explains that the process is also being filmed, and that the film will be run backwards to simulate the construction of the pyramids. Myshtigo isn't sure if Conrad is serious or not. Along the way Conrad is devastated by news that the island where he resides with his beloved wife Cassandra has been destroyed in an earthquake, along with all its inhabitants. The poet Phil dies, and in his final note to Conrad, says it is crucial to keep Myshtigo alive, though he too does not say why. This steels Conrad's determination to protect Myshtigo, which he does through several attempts to kill both Myshtigo and the group as whole. In the final battle to protect the Vegan, Cassandra, having escaped the cataclysm at sea in Conrad's yacht, appears and delivers the decisive saving blow. Myshtigo, saying he has seen enough, cuts the tour short and heads home.

It is eventually revealed that Myshtigo has been charged with the final disposition of the planet Earth, which Vega no longer wants as a colony, and his "tour" was to take a personal look at the situation in general and Conrad in particular. Dos Santos and his group realize that Conrad has been fighting to protect the Earth in his own way. Through actions such as the deconstruction of the pyramids, Conrad makes the Vegans see that Earthlings would rather destroy the planet's riches than see them fall into the hands of others. Having seen the mettle of which Conrad is made, Myshtigo decides to leave the planet in the possession of the one being with the longevity, power and moral fiber to do well by it. Conrad finds himself the owner and caretaker of Earth.

== Major themes ==
Many of Zelazny's heroes are overmen, or even gods or demigods; Conrad Nomikos is no exception to the rule. Identified early in the book as a possible "Kallikantzaros" by his lover Cassandra (who exhibits the same abilities as her namesake to foretell the future but not be believed), Conrad is later also compared to Pan. Whether or not Conrad is a god, however, is left unclear in the book: while he has led an extraordinarily long life, it is hinted that this could be the result of mutation due to the nuclear war. Jane Lindskold, in her book titled Roger Zelazny, suggests that the fact that Conrad's face is handsome on one side and disfigured on the other is a metaphor for Conrad's ability to be both creator and destroyer, and it is not until the end of the book that the broken god can be "healed".

Zelazny declared that “I wanted to leave it open to several interpretations—well, at least two. I wanted to sort of combine fantasy and sf… either Conrad is a mutant or he is the Great God Pan. The book may be read either way.” In keeping with this, some of the clues that Conrad may be Pan are that Conrad's surname Nomikos recalls Nomios (one of Pan's titles), he plays a syrinx (panpipes) in the novel, he may be immortal, and he has a disfigured appearance (limp, scarred face, and heterochromia).

Conrad Nomikos is a prototype for later Zelazny rogues such as Corwin, the amnesiac hero from The Chronicles of Amber and the cigarette-smoking Buddha, Sam (aka Mahasamatman) in Lord of Light — both flawed humans who are also flawed superhumans.

Zelazny also identified Aldous Huxley as one model he kept in mind while writing this novel: "Bear [Huxley] in mind when constructing the cast of characters, including the monomaniac scientist as a note of thanks for the assist, but take nothing else. Do not lean too heavily on anyone."

== Reception ==
Algis Budrys praised This Immortal as "an extremely interesting and undeniably important book", describing it as "a story of adventures and perils, high intrigue, esthetics [and] politics ... utterly charming [and] optimistic". He predicted that, among New Wave science fiction writers, Zelazny's career would become more important and enduring than Thomas M. Disch's.

Lawrence P. Ashmead, an editor for Doubleday & Company Inc., rejected the book for publication, claiming that "the plot is terribly thin and uninteresting." He also pans the "Germanic constructions and pseudo-clever dialogue" of the book.

== Release details ==
=== As ...And Call Me Conrad ===
- New York: The Magazine of Fantasy and Science Fiction, Mercury Press, October and November 1965

=== As This Immortal ===
- New York: Ace Books, 1966, paperback
- London: Rupert Hart-Davis, 1967, hardcover
- London: Panther, 1968, paperback
- New York: Ace Books, 1973, paperback
- New York: Ace Books, 1974, paperback
- New York: Garland Press, 1975, hardcover
- New York: Ace Books, 1980, paperback
- Irthlingborough, UK: John Goodchild, 1984, hardcover
- London: Methuen, 1985, paperback
- Norwalk, Connecticut: Easton Press, 1986, hardcover
- New York: Ace Books/SFBC, 1988, hardcover
- New York: Baen Books, 1989, paperback
- London: Victor Gollancz Ltd, 2000, paperback
- New York: Ibooks, 2004, paperback

== Related works ==
Harry Turtledove obtained permission to use the character Conrad Nomikos in the story "Gorgopotamus Bridge," first appearing in the anthology Combat Monsters: Untold Tales of World War II (2025) from Blackstone Publishing, edited by Henry Herz. The story deals with the role of Nomikos, then known as "Konstantin Karaghiosis," in the titular historical sabotage mission during the Second World War.
