= Nebula Award Stories 1965 =

1966 anthology edited by Damon Knight

- First edition (US)
- Editor: Damon Knight
- Cover artist: Donald Crews and Ann Crews
- Language: English
- Series: Nebula Award Stories
- Genre: Science fiction
- Publisher: Doubleday 1966 (US); Gollancz 1967 (UK)
- Publication place: United States
- Media type: Print (hardcover)
- Pages: xii, 299
- OCLC: 45032759
- Followed by: Nebula Award Stories Two

Nebula Award Stories 1965 is an anthology of science fiction short works edited by Damon Knight. It was first published in hardcover by Doubleday in 1966, with a Science Fiction Book Club edition following in October of the same year. The first British edition was published by Gollancz in 1967. Paperback editions followed from Pocket Books in the U.S. in November 1967 (reprinted in October 1968 and December 1969), and New English Library in the U.K. in April 1969. The U.K. and paperback editions bore the variant title Nebula Award Stories 1. The book was more recently reissued by Stealth Press in hardcover in February 2001. It has also been published in German.

== Summary ==
The book collects pieces published in 1965 that won or were nominated for the Nebula Awards for novella, novelette and short story for the year 1966, together with an introduction by the editor. Not all non-winning pieces nominated for the awards were included.

== Contents ==
- "Introduction" (Damon Knight)
- "The Doors of His Face, the Lamps of His Mouth" [Best Novelette winner] (Roger Zelazny)
- "Balanced Ecology" [Best Short Story nominee] (James H. Schmitz)
- ""Repent, Harlequin!" Said the Ticktockman" [Best Short Story winner] (Harlan Ellison)
- "He Who Shapes" [Best Novella co-winner] (Roger Zelazny)
- "Computers Don't Argue" [Best Short Story nominee] (Gordon R. Dickson)
- "Becalmed in Hell" [Best Short Story nominee] (Larry Niven)
- "The Saliva Tree" [Best Novella co-winner] (Brian W. Aldiss)
- "The Drowned Giant" [Best Short Story nominee] (J. G. Ballard)
- "Nebula Awards 1965 and Roll of Honor"

== Reception ==
P. Schuyler Miller, reviewing the anthology for Analog, took a clinical approach, discussing the founding of the sponsoring organization, its institution of the Nebula Awards and the first awards themselves before proceeding to the book (already projected as the "first in a series of annual anthologies") and its contents. Without evaluating the book as a whole, he reviews the pieces included separately by the categories in which they were nominated, making note of those that first appeared in Analog. Of the co-winning novellas, he calls the Aldiss story "something of a stunt," but feels Zelazny's "He Who Shapes" "has a good deal more meat in it," approving its treatment of character. He finds the same author's winning novelette, "The Doors of His Face, the Lamps of His Mouth" "a forceful story." In the category of best short story he prefers Schmitz's, which "has his unique flavor" to Ellison's winning piece, while stating "I can't complain, since I didn't vote." Of the remaining runners-up, he characterizes Niven's as "a scientific problem story," Dickson's as a "black comedy" and Ballard's as "one of his strangest stories."

The book was also reviewed by Judith Merril in The Magazine of Fantasy & Science Fiction v. 32, no. 1, January 1967, Tony Sudbery in Vector 45, July 1967, and (retrospectively) by Jonathan Strahan in Locus #486, July 2001, Don D'Ammassa in Science Fiction Chronicle #214, July 2001, and Paul Levinson in The New York Review of Science Fiction no. 165, May 2002.
