= To Die in Italbar =

1973 novel by Roger Zelazny

- Original hardcover edition
- Author: Roger Zelazny
- Cover artist: Margo Herr
- Language: English
- Genre: Science fiction
- Publisher: Doubleday
- Publication date: 1973
- Publication place: United States
- Media type: Print (hardback & paperback)
- Pages: 182
- ISBN: 0-385-02020-1 (first edition); ISBN 0-7434-4536-8 (Paperback reprint)
- OCLC: 666882
- Dewey Decimal: 813/.5/4
- LC Class: PZ4.Z456 To PS3576.E43
- Preceded by: Isle of the Dead

To Die in Italbar (1973) is a science fiction novel by American writer Roger Zelazny. To Die in Italbar follows Mr. H, a man who needs only to touch someone to heal or hurt them, during a deadly galactic pandemic.

The novel is a distant legacy sequel to Zelazny's novel Isle of the Dead, taking place at least a few decades later, with the previous protagonist Francis Sandow appearing late in the book as a secondary character. Zelazny wrote this novel hastily to fulfill a contract when he became a full-time writer in May 1969, and the publisher declined to publish it at that time. Zelazny revisited the manuscript in 1972 and added about 25% of new material, including a cameo of Sandow to "jazz up" the novel. It was finally released in 1973. He regretted the book ever since that time, calling it his "worst novel" and noting that “If I could kill off one book it would be To Die in Italbar. I wrote that in a hurry to make some money after I quit my job.”

== Plot ==
Heidel von Hymack, known to all as "H", is a man with the power to cure people of incurable diseases. He travels from world to world healing people by touching them. However his healing powers have a dark side: after a while they reverse and he becomes a spreader of deadly diseases. Avoiding contact with others is almost impossible because of his celebrity, so his most dedicated followers tend to die horribly. He does not know why he has this power, though he dreams of a mysterious "Lady" who rules his life. In fact he has been accidentally joined to a deity of the Pei'an religion, a goddess of disease and healing whose changing moods determine whether he saves or kills. The only other human so joined is Francis Sandow, a man of incalculable wealth who builds planets. Sandow was introduced in the novel Isle of the Dead.

Commander Malacar Miles is the only man living on an Earth devastated in an interstellar war between DYNAB and the Combined Leagues (CL). He uses his unexpired diplomatic immunity from the peace negotiations to wage a campaign of sabotage on the CL economy. Learning of "H", he searches for him in order to use him for bioterrorism.

Francis Sandow is searching for "H" to put a stop to the plagues "H" has been spreading. Sandow, Miles, "H", and others meet in a confrontation where Miles is killed and the "Lady" is exorcised from her host. Sandow agrees to use his wealth and worldscaping powers to restore the Earth.

== Reception ==
Sidney Coleman, writing in F&SF magazine, found the novel greatly inferior to Zelazny's previous novels. Nevertheless, Coleman acknowledged that if evaluated simply as "preposterous adventure," it was a well-written "superior specimen" marked by "fast action," "strong emotion", "colorful characters," and its author's "fertile imagination."

== Sources ==
- Levack, Daniel J. H. (1983). Amber Dreams: A Roger Zelazny Bibliography. San Francisco: Underwood/Miller. pp. 65–66. ISBN 0-934438-39-0.
