= The Doors of His Face, the Lamps of His Mouth =

Novelette by Roger Zelazny

- Short story by Roger Zelazny
- Country: United States
- Language: English
- Genre: Science fiction

Publication
- Published in: The Magazine of Fantasy and Science Fiction
- Publication type: Periodical
- Publisher: Mercury Publications
- Media type: Magazine
- Publication date: March 1965

"The Doors of His Face, the Lamps of His Mouth" is a science fiction novelette by Roger Zelazny. Originally published in the March 1965 issue of The Magazine of Fantasy and Science Fiction, it won the 1966 Nebula Award for Best Novelette and was nominated for the 1966 Hugo Award for Best Short Fiction.

Writing in The Encyclopedia of Science Fiction, John Clute found that Zelazny's story "intoxicatingly dashes together myth and literary assonances—in this case Herman Melville's Moby-Dick—and sex". Gardner Dozois commented that "Doors of His Face" was inspired by "a loving nostalgia for the era of the pulp adventure story that was then widely supposed to be ending".

In the introduction to the novelette in Nebula Award Stories 1965, editor Damon Knight noted that the story received more votes than any other nominee in its category—more, in fact, than all the others combined.

The story has been interpreted as employing New Wave stylistics through its use of onomastics, metaphors and similes. The title is based on verses from the Book of Job in the King James Version of the Bible, specifically chapter 41, verses 14 and 19—part of the description of the Leviathan: "Who can open the doors of his face?" and "Out of his mouth go burning lamps".

== Plot summary ==
The story is set on Venus at a time when mankind has achieved routine travel to the various planets of the Solar System. Unlike the actual planet, Zelazny's Venus is Earth-like, offering breathable air, water-filled oceans and native fauna, one of which is the fictional Ichthyform Leviosaurus Levianthus, a 300-foot-long denizen of the Venusian oceans commonly called "Ikky". It has never been caught, despite numerous attempts to do so.

The story's two main protagonists are Jean Luharich and Carlton Davits. Luharich is a successful businesswoman and media celebrity who is financing, and commanding, an expedition to capture an Ikky. The ship used is known as Tensquare, a nuclear powered platform designed by a rich entrepreneur who went broke looking for Ikky. Davits is a work-for-hire seaman who has been on the crew of several earlier attempts, and in fact had once been in Luharich's position: a playboy sportsman who hired Tensquare to catch an Ikky, until he was injured in a disastrous try whose failure he blames on himself. Davits and Luharich were previously involved in a brief romantic relationship which ended years before the story begins. Both are fiercely competitive and excellent swimmers. Davits hires on with the condition that he stays sober.

Davits has been hired on as a "baitman"—the crewmember who is tasked with diving to the end of a submerged cable so as to attach and activate an electronic lure. Because the lure is deployed only when an Ikky has been detected in close proximity to the ship, the baitman can find himself dangerously close to the Ikky. This happens to Davits. He manages to safely return to the ship, where he assists Luharich in a successful capture, for which she has to overcome the same primal fears that caused Davits to fail in his attempt, when he saw the face of the Leviathan.

== Zelazny's conception of Venus ==
John Clute described Zelazny's Venus as "fantastical, densely described" and "almost entirely 'unscientific'". In Gardner Dozois' view, Zelazny recognized that the Venus depicted in "The Doors of His Face, the Lamps of His Mouth" was not the actual planet. Instead, Dozois saw Zelazny's planet as "an homage, a deliberate act of retro nostalgia" for Venus in fiction, the "lushly romantic pulp version ... that had been popularized in tales from Planet Stories and Thrilling Wonder Stories decades before".

Zelazny explained his conception of Venus as intentionally written before such a story was rendered impossible by scientific discovery. "By late 1961 we already had fly-by photos which indicated what the surface of Mars and Venus were really like. But the knowledge was not yet so disseminated to the public, and so one could still get away with a story of the older variety... That was it. I could never do another story of that sort again. They [The Doors of His Face, the Lamps of His Mouth and A Rose for Ecclesiastes] were both my tribute to a phase in the genre’s history which was closed forever."

== Publication history ==
In addition to its original appearance in The Magazine of Fantasy and Science Fiction, "The Doors of His Face, the Lamps of His Mouth" appeared in two best-of-the-year anthologies: The Best from Fantasy and Science Fiction (15th Series, 1966) and Nebula Award Stories 1965 (1966).

Since then, the story has been anthologized at least twelve times, including translations into French, German and Italian. The story also appears in eight collections devoted to Zelazny's work, including translations into Dutch and Lithuanian. In 1991, the story was published as a chapbook by Pulphouse Publishing.

== See also ==
- The Doors of His Face, The Lamps of His Mouth, and Other Stories, short story collection
- "The Fog Horn," by Ray Bradbury
