= Roadmarks =

1979 science fantasy novel by Roger Zelazny

- Cover of first edition (hardcover)
- Author: Roger Zelazny
- Cover artist: Darrell K. Sweet
- Language: English
- Genre: Science fantasy
- Publisher: Del Rey
- Publication date: October 1979
- Publication place: United States
- Media type: Print (hardback & paperback)
- Pages: 185
- ISBN: 0-345-28530-1
- OCLC: 4908136
- Dewey Decimal: 813/.5/4
- LC Class: PZ4.Z456 Rm PS3576.E43

Roadmarks is a science fantasy novel by American author Roger Zelazny, written during the late 1970s and published in 1979.

== Structure and characters ==
The novel postulates a road that travels through time, with a nexus placed every few years, where a handful of specially gifted people are able to enter and exit. The plot involves a series of assassination attempts on the protagonist, with short vignettes on each of the would-be assassins.

The book has two poetry collections as characters; Les Fleurs du Mal by Charles Baudelaire and Leaves of Grass by Walt Whitman appear as cybernetic extensions of themselves. The collections are companions to the protagonist and his son Randy, and they are referred to as "Flowers" and "Leaves" respectively. The collections talk, argue, and often quote their own content, exhibiting human-like levels of intelligence.

The novel alternates between non-linear "Two" and linear "One" chapters. Zelazny explains as follows:

I did not decide until I was well into the book that since there was really two time-situations being dealt with (on-Road and off-Road—with off-Road being anywhen in history), I needed only two chapter headings, One and Two, to let the reader know where we are. And since the Twos were non-linear, anyway, I clipped each Two chapter into a discrete packet, stacked them and then shuffled them before reinserting them between the Ones. It shouldn't have made any difference, though I wouldn't have had the guts to try doing that without my experience with my other experimental books and the faith it had given me in the feelings I'd developed toward narrative."

The book's editor was confused by the "Two" chapters and required Zelazny to rearrange the order of several before publication.

== Plot summary ==
The central theme of the novel is time travel, using a highway that links all times and all possible histories. Exits from the highway lead to different times and places. Changing events in the past cause some exits further up the road, in the future, to become overgrown and inaccessible and new exits to appear, leading to different alternative futures.

The narrator and protagonist, Red Dorakeen, has vague memories of a place or time that is no longer accessible from the Road. He runs guns to the Greeks at Marathon, trying to recreate history as he remembers it in an attempt to open a new exit from the Road to his half-remembered place. The phrase "Last Exit to Babylon" was the manuscript title of the book and appears on the cover art; it was later used as a title for Volume Four in the Collected Stories of Roger Zelazny.

All "One" chapters feature Red Dorakeen, and all "Two" chapters feature secondary characters. These are Red's natural son Randy, newly introduced to the Road and tired of his old life in Ohio; a series of potential assassins attempting to kill Red, some of whom are comic references to pulp characters or real people; and Leila, a woman whose destiny is closely connected to Red's.

The "One" storyline is fairly linear, but the "Two" storyline jumps around in time and sequence, first introducing Randy and Leila without introduction, then later showing Randy's introduction to the Road and meeting with Leila, who will/has just abandoned Red following an incident in the "One" timeline. The narrative becomes clear in the final chapter.

== Reception ==
Greg Costikyan reviewed Roadmarks in Ares Magazine #5, commenting that "Roadmarks is a fun book – and, from anyone but Zelazny, it would be considered a tour de force. Its major difficulty would seem to be that Zelazny tried to force too many ideas into a length unsuited for them, thus being unable to exploit all of those ideas to satisfying fullness."

== Reviews ==
- Review by Baird Searles (1980) in Isaac Asimov's Science Fiction Magazine, January 1980
- Review by Stephen P. Brown [as by Steve Brown] (1980) in Heavy Metal, February 1980
- Review by Tom Staicar (1980) in Amazing Stories, May 1980
- Review by Darrell Schweitzer (1980) in Science Fiction Review, May 1980
- Review by Orson Scott Card (1980) in Destinies, Spring 1980
- Review by Spider Robinson (1980) in Analog Science Fiction/Science Fact, May 1980
- Review by Tom Hosty (1980) in Foundation, #20 October 1980
- Review by uncredited (1981) in Ad Astra, Issue Sixteen
- Review by Martyn Taylor (1981) in Vector 105
- Review by W. Ritchie Benedict (1981) in Thrust, #17, Summer 1981

== Adaptation ==
In February 2021, it was reported that George R.R. Martin and Kalinda Vazquez were developing a television adaptation of the novel for HBO (a pay television service).
