= The Doors of His Face, The Lamps of His Mouth, and Other Stories =

Short story collection by Roger Zelazny

- Dust jacket from first edition
- Author: Roger Zelazny
- Cover artist: Peggy Barnett
- Language: English
- Genre: Science fiction
- Publisher: Doubleday
- Publication date: 1971
- Publication place: United States
- Media type: Print (hardcover)
- Pages: 229 pp
- ISBN: 0-385-08216-9

The Doors of His Face, The Lamps of His Mouth, and Other Stories is a collection of science fiction short stories by American writer Roger Zelazny. It was published in 1971 by Doubleday.

== Contents ==
The stories in the original edition are as follows:

- "The Doors of His Face, the Lamps of His Mouth", winner of the 1965 Nebula Award for Best Novelette
- "The Keys to December"
- "Devil Car"
- "A Rose for Ecclesiastes"
- "The Monster and the Maiden"
- "Collector's Fever"
- "This Mortal Mountain"
- "This Moment of the Storm"
- "The Great Slow Kings"
- "A Museum Piece"
- "Divine Madness"
- "Corrida"
- "Love Is An Imaginary Number"
- "The Man Who Loved the Faioli"
- "Lucifer"

Stories added in later editions:

- "The Furies"
- "The Graveyard Heart"

== Selected Synopses ==
The title story, about extreme sportsmen who fish for "sea monsters" in the oceans of Venus, won the first Nebula Award for Best Novelette in 1965.

"This Mortal Mountain" is also about future extreme sports—mountain climbing on a planet with a mountain that is tens of kilometers high, extending far above any breathable atmosphere.

"This Moment of the Storm" is about a constable on a distant colony planet, whose duties include the use of armed drone aircraft.

== Reception ==
Dave Langford reviewed The Doors of His Face, The Lamps of His Mouth for White Dwarf magazine (issue #87), and he commented that "there are enough goodies here to prove this author had magic in his typewriter, for a while...".

== Reviews ==
- Review by Charlie Brown (1971) in Locus, #102 December 10, 1971
- Review by Douglas Barbour (1973) in Riverside Quarterly, August 1973
- Review [German] by Joachim Körber? (1981) in SF Perry Rhodan Magazin, 2/81
- Review [German] by uncredited (1982) in Reclams Science Fiction Führer
- Review by K. V. Bailey (1987) in Paperback Inferno, #66
- Review by Andy Sawyer (1988) in Paperback Inferno, #70
- Review by Graham Sleight (2011) in Locus, #611 December 2011

== Sources ==
- Levack, Daniel J. H. (1983). Amber Dreams: A Roger Zelazny Bibliography. San Francisco: Underwood/Miller. pp. 32–33. ISBN 0-934438-39-0.
