= Unicorn Variation =

Fantasy novelette by Roger Zelazny

"Unicorn Variation" is a 1981 fantasy story by American writer Roger Zelazny. It was first published in Isaac Asimov's Science Fiction Magazine.

== Plot summary ==
In an abandoned saloon, a man and a unicorn play chess. The fate of humanity is at stake. A Sasquatch aids the human.

== Reception ==
"Unicorn Variation" won the 1982 Hugo Award for Best Novelette, and was ranked second for 1982's Locus Award for Best Novelette. The Japanese version won the 1984 Seiun Award for Best Translated Short Story.

== Origin ==
In his 1983 collection Unicorn Variations, Zelazny explained the story's origin: he had been approached by Gardner Dozois, who was soliciting content for an anthology of stories about unicorns. Subsequently, he was approached by another editor, who was soliciting content for an anthology of stories set in bars. When Zelazny told George R. R. Martin of these encounters, Martin said that Fred Saberhagen was soliciting content for an anthology of stories about chess; he then jokingly suggested that Zelazny write a story about chess and unicorns in a bar, so that he could sell the story to all three anthologies. Zelazny went on to do exactly that and subsequently won a Hugo Award for the story. The game described is Halprin v. Pillsbury in Munich, 1900.
