= Changeling (novel) =

1980 fantasy novel by Roger Zelazny

- Cover illustration from the first edition (paperback)
- Author: Roger Zelazny
- Illustrator: Esteban Maroto
- Cover artist: Esteban Maroto
- Language: English
- Genre: Fantasy
- Publisher: Ace Books
- Publication date: June 1980
- Publication place: United States
- Media type: Print (paperback)
- Pages: 252
- ISBN: 0-441-10257-3
- OCLC: 7592256
- Followed by: Madwand

Changeling is a 1980 fantasy novel by American writer Roger Zelazny. It was nominated for a Locus Award in 1981, and it was followed by a sequel, Madwand.

== Plot summary ==
The people had long suffered under Det Morson's power. When the wizard Mor finally joined the fight, Det and his infamous Rondoval castle were destroyed. But the victory was incomplete, because the conquerors found a baby amid the rubble—Det's son, Pol. Unwilling to kill the child, Mor took him to a parallel world where technology prevailed, and the practice of magic was considered to be mere legend. Mor substituted Pol for a baby of the same age, using a spell to persuade the parents to recognize him as their own child. In order to retain the balance between the worlds, Mor took the baby from the other world and brought it back to his own world, leaving it with a local artisan named Marak.

== Plot ==
In the world of magic, the young Mark Marakson is obsessed with devices, building water wheels and later, steam engines. He does not understand why the people on the farms and villages rely on magicians rather than using the machinery he creates. Young Pol, meanwhile, grows up a poet, musician and singer, marked by the white streak in his dark hair. He is a great disappointment to the man he regards as his father, who is an engineer. From time to time he sees glowing strands in the air which he can touch to make things happen.

Mark is ostracised by the people around him and wanders in the hills until he finds a graveyard of machines, left from the ancient war between magic and technology. Able to restart them, he returns in triumph on a flying machine to claim his childhood sweetheart in the village, only to be assaulted by the villagers, losing an eye. Fleeing back to the graveyard he creates an army of machines to take revenge.

Mor, realizing that he has disturbed the balance of the world, goes to retrieve Pol to counter Mark, revealing Pol's heritage and powers to him. To return Pol, the elderly Mor has to remain in the technology world to balance out the transfer. He dies in a park where every tree, bird and insect is artificial.

Pol must find his way around Castle Rondoval. The strands he can use to perform magic are everywhere around him. Soon he finds a thief who was in the castle when Mor cast a sleep spell over it. Revived, the thief becomes his helper. He also discovers Det's dragons asleep in the dungeons. Reviving the mightiest one, who recognizes him as his former master's son, he then has to set out on a quest to find the three segments of his father's magical staff, scattered across the world by Mor. On the journey, he is accompanied by Mark's former sweetheart, thus creating a romantic triangle.

The quest requires him to defeat several magical traps and guardians. Completing it, he is able to take on and defeat Mark Marakson, restoring the balance of his world. In doing so, he loses the affections of the girl. He is left to seek his future in Rondoval, among the old magics left by his father. The next part of his story is told in the novel Madwand.

== Sources ==
- Levack, Daniel J. H. (1983). Amber Dreams: A Roger Zelazny Bibliography. San Francisco: Underwood/Miller. p. 21. ISBN 0-934438-39-0.
