= Mrtyu =

Hindu personification of death

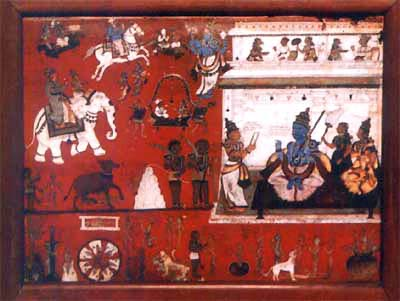
Yama's court.

Mṛtyu (Sanskrit: मृत्यु, romanized: Mṛtyu, lit. 'Death'), is a Sanskrit word meaning death. Mṛtyu, or Death, is often personified as the deities Mara (मर) and Yama (यम) in Dharmic religions such as Hinduism and Buddhism.

- Mṛtyu-māra as death in Buddhism or Māra, a "demon" of the Buddhist cosmology, the personification of Temptation.
- Yama (Sanskrit: यम) is the god of death and the underworld in Hinduism and Buddhism.
  - Yama in Hinduism.
  - Yama in Buddhism.

== Etymology ==
The Vedic mṛtyú, along with Avestan mərəθiiu and Old Persian məršiyu comes from the Proto-Indo-Iranian word for death, *mr̥tyú-, which is ultimately derived from the Indo-European root *mer- ("to die") and thus is further related to Ancient Greek μόρος and Latin mors.

== Literature ==
=== Vedas ===
Mrtyu is invoked in the hymns of the Rigveda:

Depart, Mṛtyu, by a different path; by that which is your own, and distinct from the path of the gods; I speak to you who have eyes, who have ears; do no harm to our offspring, nor to our male progeny.

— Rigveda, Hymn 10.18.1

=== Upanishads ===
The Brhadaranyaka Upanishad (a mystical appendix to the Shatapatha Brahmana and likely the oldest of the Upanishads) has a creation myth where Mṛtyu "Death" takes the shape of a horse, and includes an identification of the Ashvamedha horse sacrifice with the Sun:

Then he became a horse (ashva), because it swelled (ashvat), and was fit for sacrifice (medhya); and this is why the horse-sacrifice is called Ashva-medha [...] Therefore the sacrificers offered up the purified horse belonging to Prajapati, (as dedicated) to all the deities. Verily the shining sun [ye tapati] is the Asvamedha, and his body is the year; Agni is the sacrificial fire (arka), and these worlds are his bodies. These two are the sacrificial fire and the Asvamedha-sacrifice, and they are again one deity, viz. Death.

— Brhadaranyaka Upanishad, Hymn 1.2.7

=== Padma Purana ===
Mrtyu fights in the war between the devas and the asuras in the legend of Jalandhara.

=== Mahabharata ===
The Mahabharata references a legend regarding a dispute between Time, Mrityu, Yama, Ikshvaku, and a Brahmana. Mrityu is female in this legend.

== See also ==
- Yama
- Yamaduta
- Chitragupta
