= Isle of the Dead (Zelazny novel) =

1969 novel by Roger Zelazny

- First edition
- Author: Roger Zelazny
- Cover artist: Leo and Diane Dillon
- Language: English
- Genre: Science fiction
- Publisher: Ace Books
- Publication date: 1969
- Publication place: United States
- Media type: Print (hardback & paperback)
- Pages: 190
- ISBN: 0-441-37469-7

Isle of the Dead is a science fiction novel by American writer Roger Zelazny, published in 1969 with cover art by Leo and Diane Dillon. It was nominated for the Nebula Award for Best Novel in 1969, and it won the French Prix Apollo in 1972. The title refers to the several paintings by Swiss-German painter Arnold Böcklin. In the novel, Francis Sandow refers to “that mad painting by Boecklin, The Isle of the Dead.” Böcklin created at least five paintings with that title, each depicting an oarsman and a standing figure in a small boat, crossing dark water toward a forbidding island. A later edition by Ace Books featured a cover painting by Dean Ellis that was intentionally reminiscent of Böcklin's work.

== Background ==
As to the novel's inspiration, Zelazny noted that “This was a spin-off from the novelette I did called ‘This Moment of the Storm.’ Actually, it wasn't the guy I was interested in, at first. I wanted somebody that was born in the twentieth century, who had made it aboard one of these generation starships where he'd been frozen and spent generations getting to this new planet which proved habitable. By the time he got there, they’d invented a faster-than-light drive, because several centuries had gone by and they’d become more sophisticated. Earth had much higher technology, and he had the means of going back fast if he wanted to, but he didn't. He wasn't sure he was happy on the world he'd reached, though, and decided to go out and try a few others, since it was easy to do. There were still time dilation effects and, through making a few sharp investments here and there, with so much time passing, he became quite wealthy. He also happened to become the oldest human in the galaxy, and because of the fancy new medicine he was in very good shape. He also just happened to have been through the initiation ritual which would make him a god in this other religion, even though he didn't believe in it wholeheartedly. But it was the concept of the big expanse of time that interested me."

== Plot introduction ==
Francis Sandow is the last surviving human born in the 20th century. An early space colonist, he spent long centuries of space travel in suspended animation. After his last such trip, he woke in the 27th century, where everything had changed. Desperate for something to hold to, he sought out a mentor, who happened to be a member of a very long-lived and slowly dying alien race, the Pei'ans. Under this tutelage, Sandow eventually became a telepath and "worldscaper". Worldscapers have the ability to create and/or terraform planets. The process of becoming a worldscaper culminates in a mystic rite called "Naming" that binds the mortal to one of the gods in the Pei'an pantheon, and it is believed that the worldscaper is actually acting as an avatar for the god. There are only twenty-seven existing worldscapers; Sandow, bound to Shimbo of Darktree, Shrugger of Thunders, is the only non-Pei'an among them. Outworlders are welcome to practice the religion, which is called Strantri. Sandow opines it will be the first major religion to outlive its founders. Unlike most of the Pei'an deities, who tend to be chimeras like Egyptian gods, Shimbo is also unmistakably human, showing that the Pei'ans had visited Earth in the distant past.

The rite of Naming was once reserved for the high priests of the Pei'an religion. Sandow is a confirmed agnostic as far as the objective existence of the gods is concerned. However, whenever he sits for a time in a Strantri shrine, the icon of Shimbo always lights up, and this happens simultaneously in every shrine in the galaxy.

At the beginning of the novel, Sandow is one of the most famous men in the Galaxy, wealthy beyond imagination, living a life of seclusion and luxury in worlds he fashions according to his taste. But he is lured into action by a series of photographs sent to him anonymously, showing him old enemies, old friends, and old lovers—most of whom should be dead, but appearing in the photographs to be alive.

The novel is partly a tribute to Ernest Hemingway and some of its meditative sequences are written in a Hemingway-like style. Through Sandow's narrative, Zelazny presents observations on 20th-century American culture and how it has changed as other planets are created or discovered. An episode in a luxurious city of an earth colony leads to a rant on gratuities, for example.

Eventually Sandow makes his way to Illyria, a world he created as an idyllic paradise, but finds it has been severely damaged. The enemy is a Pei'an rival who as an orthodox member of the faith feels that Sandow's Naming was sacrilege. The ultimate conflict takes place on the Isle of the Dead, at the center of a great lake. It is a replica of Arnold Böcklin's famous Isle of the Dead painting.

Sandow also appears as a character in To Die in Italbar (1973) and the short story "Dismal Light" in the collection Unicorn Variations.

== Plot summary ==
Sandow is jolted from his wealthy, indolent lifestyle by a series of messages, each accompanied by a picture of one of a number of people once important to him, and all dead for many years. Sandow realizes the pictures could be fake, and he has other obligations, one of which is responding to a call for help from a friend, Ruth Laris. In the course of investigating her disappearance, he receives another message that he will find all his friends "on the Isle of the Dead". The message is in Pei'an, addressed to Shimbo (the name of the Pei'an god connected with Sandow) and signed by Belion (Shimbo's traditional enemy in Pei'an mythology).

Sandow soon learns that somebody has been stealing the memory records and tissue samples of people who died on Earth. These things are required of everyone who lives on Earth, so they can be recalled to life should the need arise. The six missing sets are of the people whose photos Sandow received.

Visiting his Pei'an mentor Marling, who is dying, Sandow learns that his tormentor is Gringrin, another Pei'an who was denied communion with a deity despite passing almost all the tests. Gringrin vowed revenge on the other worldscapers, starting with Sandow. Somehow Gringrin has been able to unite himself with Belion.

Sandow helps his mentor end his life with the glitten root ceremony, in which two telepaths take the hallucinogenic root, sharing a dream from which only one returns alive. This is also used for duelling between telepaths, which is what Sandow must do when he finds Gringrin. After the funeral, Sandow sets out for Illyria, the world he made which has the Isle of the Dead.

Landing by stealth, and armed to the teeth, he sets out to walk the remaining distance to the Isle of the Dead. He now believes that Gringrin intended him to be lured there, and slowly humiliated before all the people who ever mattered to him. He is sure Gringrin has made a major mistake by staging this on a world Sandow made. All the forces on the planet will be allied with Sandow; he is the world's God.

He comes upon Gringrin himself, alive but injured. Things have gone badly wrong. One of the recalled persons is Mike Shandon, a con man who is also a telepath, and a deadly enemy of Sandow's. He has persuaded the god Belion to abandon Gringrin and go to him. Apparently the Pei'an gods are real and Gringrin, attempting to ordain himself independently, asked for a creative spirit to come to him, but instead was chosen by Belion. Now, Belion's abandoned him and gone to Shandon. Gringrin wants to flee, but Sandow is determined to rescue as many of his friends as possible.

As the two cross the river to the island they meet more of Sandow's revived enemies and friends. From one of them, a feisty dwarf named Nick, Sandow learns that his recalled wife Kathy is having an affair with Shandon.

Sandow decides to buy Shandon off, which he is well equipped to do. As the two negotiate and link minds to confirm the deal, the gods assert themselves and a battle begins in which Shimbo's air and water battle Belion's earth and fire. A storm rages as the ground shakes and splits. Both Sandow and Shandon are consumed by their godgame, until Sandow sees Nick try to help Kathy, only to fall with her into a fissure. Both die, and at the same moment Shimbo deserts him. Shandon/Belion continues attacking, and Sandow goes down under a pile of rocks, breaking his leg. Sandow has one last trick - a laser weapon surgically implanted in his middle finger. In a supremely ironic gesture, he "gives Shandon the finger", killing him and ending the battle.

Sandow crawls away to find a "power-pull" energy nexus, so he can use its energies to summon his orbiting ship. On the way he encounters his last revived friend/enemy, Lady Karle, alive but entombed in a cave. She and Sandow were lovers who were torn apart when a corporate war, in which Sandow was a player, ruined her family and drove her to seek revenge on him. Sandow bitterly dismisses her cries and goes on. He meets Gringrin, mortally wounded. Gringrin begs him to perform the glitten rite with him, using the location of the recall tapes as an incentive. Once in the rite, Gringrin confesses that the recall tapes were ruined by Shandon's conflagration, but Ruth is alive in a hospital and can be saved. In the psychedelic trance, Sandow faces Death in the shape of the Valley of Shadows. He sees all the worlds he has made, and realizes that as long as he can create life, casting worlds like "jewels in the darkness", he has a purpose. Gringrin in turn loses his dread of death, and walks happily into the Valley.

Waking, Sandow crawls on and reunites with his ship, then returns to Lady Karle's cave with a weapon and vaporizes the rock. They hobble to the ship together.
