= Unicorn Variations =

1983 collection of stories and essays by Roger Zelazny

- Dust jacket from the first edition
- Author: Roger Zelazny
- Language: English
- Genre: Science fiction, fantasy
- Publisher: Timescape Books
- Publication date: 1983
- Publication place: United States
- Media type: Print (hardback)
- Pages: 213
- ISBN: 0-671-49449-X
- OCLC: 9827688
- Dewey Decimal: 813/.54 19
- LC Class: PS3576.E43 A6 1983

Unicorn Variations is a collection of stories and essays by American author Roger Zelazny, published in 1983. It won the Locus Award for Best Collection in 1984.

== Contents ==
- "Introduction"
- "Unicorn Variation"
- "The Last of the Wild Ones" (a follow-up short story to the earlier story "Devil Car")
- "Recital"
- "The Naked Matador"
- "The Parts That Are Only Glimpsed: Three Reflexes" (essay)
- "Dismal Light" (a follow-up short story to the novel Isle of the Dead)
- "Go Starless in the Night"
- "But Not the Herald"
- "A Hand Across the Galaxy"
- "The Force That Through the Circuit Drives the Current" (a short story that plays with themes developed in the story "Home is the Hangman")
- "Home is the Hangman" (also in the collection My Name Is Legion)
- "Fire and /or Ice"
- "Exeunt Omnes"
- "A Very Good Year"
- "My Lady of the Diodes"
- "And I Only Am Escaped to Tell Thee"
- "The Horses of Lir"
- "The Night Has 999 Eyes"
- "Angel, Dark Angel"
- "Walpurgisnacht"
- "The George Business"
- "Some Science Fiction Parameters: A Biased View" (essay)
