= Girimekhala =

Giant Elephant monster of Sri Lankan Mythology

Girimekhala (Girimekhalā) is the elephant that carries Mara in Theravada Buddhism.

== Buddhist tradition ==
Its height is 250 yojana. When Mara and his army of evil tried to prevent the future Buddha from achieving enlightenment, the Buddha asked the earth to bear testimony for his deeds and Girimekhala fell in front of the Buddha.

Girimekhala appears in the Buddhist chant Buddha-jaya-maṅgala Gāthā (Verses of the Buddha's Auspicious Victories):

Bāhuṃ sahassam-abhinimmita-sāvudhantaṃ
Grīmekhalaṃ udita-ghora-sasena-māraṃ.
Dānādi-dhamma-vidhinā jitavā munindo:
Tan-tejasā bhavatu te jaya-maṅgalāni.
[Tan-tejasā bhavatu te jaya-maṅgalāni.]

== Popular culture ==
=== Video games ===
Girimekhala has made appearances in video games including:

- Megami Tensei series
  - Shin Megami Tensei: Persona series
  - Shin Megami Tensei: Devil Children series
- Dragon Quest IX: Sentinels of the Starry Skies
- Dragon Warrior Monsters
- Dragon Warrior Monsters 2
- Final Fantasy XIV
- Tokyo Afterschool Summoners

=== Television ===
In The Real Ghostbusters, Winston battles against a demon pitcher who resembles Girimekhala in a game of baseball.

== See also ==
- Gajasura
- Gajasurasamhara
