= Madwand =

1981 novel by Roger Zelazny

- Dust-jacket illustration from the first edition.
- Author: Roger Zelazny
- Cover artist: Rowena Morrill
- Language: English
- Genre: Fantasy
- Publisher: Phantasia Press
- Publication date: 1981
- Publication place: United States
- Media type: Print (Hardcover)
- Pages: 254 pp
- ISBN: 0-932096-11-5
- OCLC: 8388617
- Dewey Decimal: 813/.54 19
- LC Class: PS3576.E43 M3
- Preceded by: Changeling

Madwand is a 1981 fantasy novel by American writer Roger Zelazny. It is a sequel to Changeling.

== Plot summary ==
Pol Detson, son of Lord Det, has come home, now a powerful sorcerer of unsurpassed natural ability. But Pol is still an untrained talent, a "madwand". To take control of his powers, to rule in his father's place, he must survive arduous training and a fantastic initiation into the rites of society.

During this process, Pol discovers that he is being monitored by a powerful magician. He has recurrent dreams of opening a portal into another world where a dark bestial erotic magic reigns supreme. Eventually he is drawn to a castle occupied by two magicians who are working to make the dream real, and want him to take his father's place in the scheme, so they can all reinvent themselves as gods in the new world.

Pol's loyalty to the world that he lives in, which will be destroyed by the dark world, causes him to resist and, with the help of a dragon, he stops the portal being opened. One of his enemies is killed and the other flees by flying away. He leaves behind a garment containing a label that says "Made in Hong Kong".

The story implied that a sequel was necessary to complete the story, but no sequel was ever written.

== Reception ==
Greg Costikyan reviewed Madwand in Ares Magazine #13 and commented that "A bad Zelazny, to be sure, is considerably better than a lot of good others; but Zelazny will have to do some work to equal his previous books."

== Reviews ==
- Review by Charles Platt (1982) in The Patchin Review, Number Three
- Review by Richard E. Geis (1982) in Science Fiction Review, Spring 1982
- Review by Lawrence I. Charters (1982) in Science Fiction & Fantasy Book Review, #3, April 1982
- Review by Algis Budrys (1982) in The Magazine of Fantasy & Science Fiction, May 1982
- Review by Joe Sanders (1982) in Starship, November 1982
- Review [French] by Eric Sanvoisin (1987) in Fiction, #389

== Sources ==
- Levack, Daniel J. H. (1983). Amber Dreams: A Roger Zelazny Bibliography. San Francisco: Underwood/Miller. pp. 53–54. ISBN 0-934438-39-0.
- Chalker, Jack L.; Mark Owings (1998). The Science-Fantasy Publishers: A Bibliographic History, 1923-1998. Westminster, MD and Baltimore: Mirage Press, Ltd. pp. 507–508.
