= Lord of Light =

1967 novel by Roger Zelazny

- Cover of first edition (hardcover)
- Author: Roger Zelazny
- Cover artist: Howard Bernstein
- Language: English
- Genre: Science fantasy
- Published: 1967 Doubleday
- Publication place: United States
- Media type: Print (hardback & paperback)
- Pages: 257
- Award: Hugo Award for Best Novel (1968)
- OCLC: 6446183

Lord of Light (1967) is a science fantasy novel by American author Roger Zelazny. It was awarded the 1968 Hugo Award for Best Novel and nominated for a Nebula Award for Best Novel. Two chapters from the novel were first published as novelettes in the Magazine of Fantasy and Science Fiction – "Dawn" in April 1967, and "Death and the Executioner" in June 1967.

Zelazny noted that Lord of Light was written so that it could be interpreted as either science fiction or fantasy. The context of the novel is modern Western characters in a Hindu-Buddhist-influenced world.

== Plot summary ==
Lord of Light is set on a planet colonized by remnants of Earth from a spaceship called the Star of India. To increase their chances of survival, the crew has used chemical treatments, biofeedback and electronics to mutate their minds and create enhanced self-images, or "Aspects", that let them channel their powers. The crew has also developed a technology to transfer a person's atman, or soul, electronically to a new body. This reincarnation by mind transfer has created a race of potential immortals and allowed the former crew members to institute the Hindu caste system, with themselves at the top.

The crew has used their powers to control the native non-human races (whom they characterize as demons) while setting themselves up as gods in the eyes of the many generations of colonist progeny. Taking on the powers and names of Hindu deities, these "gods" maintain respect and control of the masses by maintaining a stranglehold on the access to reincarnation and by suppressing any technological advancements beyond a medieval level. The gods fear that any enlightenment or advancement might lead to a technological renaissance that would eventually weaken their power.

The protagonist, Sam, who has developed the ability to manipulate electromagnetic forces, is a renegade crewman who has rejected godhood, taking for himself the role of Siddhartha Gautama, the Buddha. Sam is the last "Accelerationist": He believes that technology should be available to the masses, and that reincarnation should not be controlled by the elite. Sam introduces Buddhism to defeat the power of the gods with this "new" religion. His carefully planned revolt against the gods takes place in stages: "An army, great in space, may offer opposition in a brief span of time. One man, brief in space, must spread his opposition across a period of many years if he is to have a chance of succeeding."

=== Stories ===
1. In a monastery, the deathgod Yama – assisted by Tak the ape (formerly Tak the Archivist for the gods) and Ratri, Goddess of Night – assembles a clandestine radio transceiver to extract Sam's atman, or soul, from the "Bridge of the Gods", the planet's ring system, and restore it to a body. Sam's bodiless essence was projected by the gods into that structure after his capture in the battle of Keenset. This mode of execution was used because the last time the gods killed his body, Sam returned and stole a new one from one of the lesser gods. When Sam awakes, he claims to be horrified to be back in the flesh, having been aware of his ethereal condition the whole time, and having experienced it as a blissful Nirvana. He wants to return, to "hear the song the stars sing on the shores of the great sea". Eventually, after meditation on and immersion in earthly senses, he returns fully to the world. Shortly after, an encounter with the god Mara, who had come to investigate the disturbances caused by Yama's machinery, causes the conspirators to flee. As they proceed, Sam muses on his past.
2. Prince Siddhartha, entering old age, comes down to the city of Mahartha to obtain a new body. He finds that there have been political and religious changes while he has lived on his estates. Before getting the body, he must submit to a mind-probe, operated by the Masters of Karma, which will be used to determine his fitness for reincarnation. Those judged unfit are given diseased bodies or even reincarnated as animals such as dogs. The dogs then act as spies for the Masters. Siddhartha contacts Jan Olvegg, former captain of the Star of India, and reveals himself as Sam. He talks via a videoscreen with the current Brahma, and sees that Brahma—who he remembers was originally a woman named Madeleine, incarnated into a male body—cannot stop acting like a God, even seeming to believe it himself when he begins to 'curse' Sam. After this Sam cannot remain passive, and must proceed against the Gods. He raids the House of Karma, steals bodies for himself, Olvegg, and others, and causes the former Chief Master of Karma to be reincarnated as a dog. He then disappears to execute the next stage of his plan.
3. The Buddha appears, preaching a philosophy of non-violence that undermines the doctrine of obedience to the gods and the struggle for a better rebirth. Instead, he emphasizes the pursuit of Nirvana and release from the illusion of the world. The goddess Kali, realizing that this is Sam's work, sends her personal executioner, Rild, to kill Sam, but Rild falls ill and is found and tended to by the Buddhist acolytes, as well as by Sam himself. Because he owes Sam his life, Rild renounces his mission after he recovers. He becomes one of Sam's disciples, eventually exceeding his teacher's wisdom. He takes the name Sugata, preaching in earnest what Sam had done only calculatingly as a way to overthrow the gods. Yama descends to kill Sam. Sugata/Rild faces Yama on a treetrunk bridge over a river, knowing he cannot defeat the God of Death, but fighting him anyway. Yama kills Rild and proceeds to find Sam. However, Sam tricks Yama and escapes, promising to return with "new weapons". Sam also warns Yama against the machinations of Yama's beloved Kali, and in so doing makes a personal enemy of Yama.
4. Sam enters Hellwell, a huge pit where he had bound the demons centuries earlier. He negotiates with their leader, Taraka, for allies in his struggle. He frees Taraka to see the world above, but Taraka betrays him by taking possession of Sam's body, promising to resume the bargain "later". While in control of Sam's body, Taraka deposes a local maharajah and takes over his palace and harem. As Sam recovers control of his body, he finds himself becoming more like Taraka, enjoying the pleasures of the flesh. In turn, Taraka takes on some aspects of Sam, and ceases to revel in his life of pleasure. Sam tells him he has suffered the Curse of the Buddha, which is revealed to be a conscience and guilt. Soon after, Agni, God of Fire, arrives to kill Sam, finding instead two spirits in one body. Agni destroys the palace, while Sam/Taraka flees to Hellwell. They decide to free as many demons as possible before the gods arrive. However, even the full might of all the demons of Hellwell cannot stand against the gods. A mere four of the gods, Yama, Kali, Shiva and Agni, are able to hold off the demons and pursue Sam. Despite his own powers, Sam is captured and Taraka leaves him. Sam is told that he is to be taken to Heaven and made an example of, lest the other gods try to emulate his rebellion.
5. In the place called Heaven, Yama and Kali are to be married. Tak of the Bright Spear is the Archivist of Heaven, but is suspect because he was fathered in lifetimes past by Sam. However, Tak's main concern is seducing comely demi-goddesses such as Maya. Sam is more or less free to wander Heaven, even trysting with Kali, who would like to have him back as her lover. He preaches to any who will listen, and the gods allow this, hoping to flush out sympathizers. However, Sam knows of some of his old gadgetry locked away in one of the museums in Heaven, and with the help of Helba, the Goddess of Thieves, he attempts an escape using a belt that amplifies his powers. This fails, and Kali, disgusted with herself and with him, persuades Brahma to order a human sacrifice, namely Helba and Sam himself, to celebrate her wedding. Sam is set free once more to flee for his life, hunted by the White Tigers of Kaniburrha, some of whom may be reincarnated gods, perhaps even Kali herself. Tak attempts to protect Sam by killing the tigers, but is struck down by Ganesha. For this, Tak is sent out of Heaven in the body of an ape. The wedding proceeds, with Sam apparently dead.
6. Brahma is dead. He has been murdered by persons or gods unknown. Vishnu, Shiva, and Ganesha gather to quickly arrange a replacement. They decide that the only viable candidate is Kali. However, for her to be reincarnated as Brahma (a man), her short marriage to Yama must end. Yama is appalled at how coldly she accepts this. Next, Shiva is found murdered. Yama throws himself into investigating the deaths. His friend, Kubera, approaches the demigod Murugan and accuses him of the murders, finally addressing him as Sam. Taraka, Lord of the Rakasha, had taken a liking to Sam and 'strengthened his flames' so he could exist as pure energy, and can survive without a body. He displaced Murugan's spirit as Murugan was about to occupy a new body for the wedding feast. Kubera uncovered the deception by examining the brainwave records from the transfer. Instead of turning Sam in, Kubera offers to help him escape. Sam refuses, determined to kill as many gods as he can. Since Kubera's friend, Yama, is the obvious next target, Kubera tricks Sam, who underestimates Kubera's physical strength and the powers of his Attribute, and in a bout of Irish Stand-Down (in which two men take turns hitting each other until one cannot continue), knocks him out and prepares to flee on the giant bird Garuda. They recruit Ratri to stop Yama from interfering, and take her along. They flee to the city of Keenset, which is undergoing a technological revival and is marked for destruction by the gods. Eventually, Yama, feeling betrayed by Kali and the other gods, joins them. With Yama's weaponry, and various allies, including the zombie army of Nirriti the Black, they fight a titanic battle of gods, men, and monsters, killing thousands of men, demigods, and eventually some gods as well. They go down in defeat, but not before dealing a crushing blow to the hierarchy of heaven. Yama apparently commits suicide, but some suspect that he has invented a remote reincarnation device. Ratri is exiled from heaven and condemned to wander the world in a series of homely bodies. Kubera had hidden himself in a vault, held in suspended animation. Sam, having proved himself unkillable, is instead projected into the magnetized debris ring around the planet, known as the Bridge of the Gods. However, the gods win only a Pyrrhic victory. The most powerful deities, such as Yama, Brahma, Shiva, and Agni, are now dead or sworn enemies of Heaven. Others have gone into exile rather than fight against Sam. While Brahma/Kali is exultant, Ganesha realizes that the days of Heaven are numbered, and he must look out for himself.
7. In the final story, Sam has been returned from Nirvana. Sam, together with Yama, Ratri, and Kubera, plan their next move in their campaign against heaven. They are joined by the drunken god Krishna, who is a great fighter when sober, and who has wandered the world since he went into exile rather than fight at Keenset. Meanwhile, Nirriti, a Christian and the former chaplain of the original ship, has amassed great power in the southern continent. He is laying waste to cities in his attempts to stamp out the Hindu religion which he hates. He has acquired enough technology to challenge anything the gods can muster, even if they resort to "the tall man of smoke who wears a wide hat", apparently a reference to a nuclear device. He is also allied with the freed demons. At first he seems to be a natural ally for Sam and Yama, but they entrust the demon Taraka with conveying a message to him, and Taraka is determined to fight Yama, to prove that Taraka is the mightiest being on the planet. Thus Taraka falsely tells them that Nirriti has refused, and instead they ally with Brahma to defeat Nirriti, if Brahma will consent to their demands. This alliance defeats Nirriti in a final battle, despite Ganesha's attempt at betrayal, but at a huge cost. Brahma (the former Kali), fatally wounded, is conveyed from the battlefield by Yama. Later, Kubera finds Yama with his "daughter", whom he calls "Murga". She is mentally disabled, and Yama admits that this was due to a botched mind-transfer. Kubera, always ready to help his friend, uses his powers to stimulate Murga's mind. Sam sees Tak and Ratri restored to young bodies. Sam then leaves, no one is sure where to; sometime later, Yama follows. Myths build up around their life and departure.

== Characters ==
The novel has a range of major and minor characters. The gods live in Heaven, an artificial plateau in the polar regions "where only the mighty might make their home". It is covered by a giant dome for defense and weather control. Heaven is divided into the Celestial City and the Forest of Kaniburrha.

=== Major characters ===
- Sam is one of the crew of the Star of India, the starship which brought the colonists to the planet. Aboard the starship, he had been a botanist and operated the ship's hydroponic gardens. He thus belongs to the group who are known as the First, a diminishing group of people. As Sam says, "All the rest are dead, or are gods". He himself had been a god, styling himself Kalkin. Thanks to his several lives and exploits, he is known by many names, such as Maitreya, Lord of Light, Manjusri of the Sword, Binder of Demons and so on. His major contribution to the ascendancy of the Gods was his use of what he termed electrodirection, or mental control of electromagnetics, to control and destroy or bind the most hostile natives of the planet, beings of pure energy known to men as demons. The power can also interfere with electronics and machinery, and, if strengthened, alter gravitation. Eventually disillusioned by the rise of the Gods, he retires to the life of Prince Siddhartha, until he finally rebels. In doing so, he creates more legends, and gains more names, including Buddha, The Enlightened One, Tathagatha, Mahasamatman or Great-Souled Sam etc. After an episode of 'demonic possession' by one of the planet's original inhabitants, his 'mind' can exist outside his body, even if his body is killed. His character is inspired by the Buddhist figure of Siddhartha Gautama.
- Yama, the God of Death, begins as Sam's enemy, but later becomes his chief ally. A juvenile scientific genius, he was mortally injured in an accidental explosion, so that he had to be quickly reincarnated into the first available body, which happened to be middle-aged. He therefore was "old before he was young", and did not have the same outlook as someone who has "known first love in the days of spring". He is a "master of arms, master of sciences", who has created much of the new technology behind the power of the Gods' regime, while himself being a peerless combatant with both medieval and technologically advanced weaponry. He also has the power of the death gaze: he can kill by looking his victim in the eyes. Asked by Sam how he can bear to serve a "bunch of drunken body changers" he puts forth a "higher cause" rationale. However he also is emotionally involved with Kali, and eventually revolts as a result of her betrayal. Ganesha assesses him as "too serious, too conscientious", and "emotionally unstable". He is loosely based on the Hindu god of the same name.
- Kali, Goddess of Destruction, also known as Durga, consort of Kalkin, and once called Candi the Fierce, is another of the First. Over the centuries, she has been Sam's lover, companion, wife, comrade-in-arms, and finally enemy. She yearns for the days when the planet was still wild and unconquered. As Sam warns Yama, who loves her, she loves only "those who bring her gifts of chaos". Like Yama, she has the death-gaze power, along with many others only hinted at. She also carries a weapon, the skull-wheel, which is some kind of ultrasonic emitter that causes confusion and oblivion, even to the demons. She is very loosely based on the Hindu goddess of the same name.
- Tak, of the Bright Spear, is a former demigod exiled to the world as an ape, as punishment for trying to help Sam while he was in captivity. He is also Sam's son, possibly of Sam's original body, a fact of which Sam may not be aware. Tak is very philosophical and practical, once rationalizing that when people have many bodies, biological parenthood becomes meaningless; and yet that kinship seems to be his motive for helping Sam.
- Kubera is Yama's friend and companion in an order of the Gods called the Lokapalas. He loves his food and drink; no matter how he is reincarnated, his body always runs to fat. He is however, shrewdly intelligent and a master technologist, surpassing Yama in some areas. He is known as steadfastedly loyal, and has never broken his word once he has given it. He has the unique ability to invest inanimate objects with emotion and feelings, which he uses to create the Pavilion of Silence at Worldsend, a structure at the far end of the place known as Heaven in which rooms are dedicated to emotions such as Despair, Heartbreak, and Fear. This is a place of retreat for the Gods. After centuries of idleness as a God he eventually breaks with the rest and helps Sam. He is very loosely based on the Hindu god of the same name.
- Ratri, the Goddess of the Night, is Kubera's friend who is drawn into the conflict, not altogether unwillingly. She too is disgusted by the treatment Sam received in Heaven, and goes to Kubera for advice after she witnesses Brahma's last twitches when he is poisoned. Eventually she helps Kubera escape Heaven with Sam. Her power is to cast Night—enforced darkness—across any area, which is used in the Battle of Keenset. After that battle, because she is judged to have been merely weak-willed in helping Sam, she is expelled from Heaven to wander the world in bodies that can not express her powers, or her beauty. In spite of this she can occasionally summon the strength to become the Goddess whose "radiance drives out the dark". As a character she provides an emotional counterweight to Yama's hatred and Sam's zeal. She is very loosely based on the Hindu goddess of the same name.

=== Minor characters ===
- Jan Olvegg, also known as Olvagga, or Janaveg, or Janagga, is another one of the First, having been the Captain of the colonists' ship. Sam encounters him in exile while still contemplating his own rebellion. He identifies himself to Olvegg with "It's a long way to Tipperary". Olvegg, who at first cannot recognize Sam because of his changing of bodies, brings Sam up to date on the rise of the Gods since Sam retired, and thus precipitates Sam's campaign. He is later captured by, and agrees to fight for, Nirriti the Black. Nirriti remembers that Olvegg was a Christian, although far less fanatical than Nirriti in spreading his faith.
- Rild, later called Sugata, is introduced as an assassin and master swordsman, a holy disciple of Kali. He is sent to kill Sam while Sam is reviving Buddhism by playing the Buddha, but instead becomes a convert to Buddhist philosophy and eventually attains true enlightenment. This has some similarities to the tale of Aṅgulimāla. Sugata is also one of the traditional epithets for Buddha. The use of Sugata for Rild stresses his attainment of true enlightenment. Sam, whose epithet is Tathagata, a different traditional epithet for Buddha, refers to Rild as the true Buddha when conversing with Yama.
- Trimurti, composed of Brahma, Vishnu and Shiva, rule in Heaven.
  - Brahma, the Creator, is weak-spirited, mostly concerned with his manliness, since he was originally a woman named Madeleine. He is very loosely based on the Hindu god of the same name.
  - Shiva, the Destroyer, is an "old warhorse" whose main power is a trident made by Yama, which can kill or disintegrate. Shiva also uses the "Thunder Chariot", a jet-powered aircraft. He is very loosely based on the Hindu god of the same name.
  - Vishnu, the Preserver, was the architect of the place called Heaven, but is a passive god who goes along with Brahma's machinations, which in turn seem to be driven by the influence of Kali and Ganesha. He is very loosely based on the Hindu god of the same name.
- Ganesha is a manipulator, an insider, the self-styled power behind the throne. He is not, however, as ingenious as he thinks he is, and makes huge mistakes that prove to be disastrous to the Gods. He helps Nirriti at the beginning, hoping to make him into a puppet "enemy of Heaven" that can be used to scare people, only to be surprised by how powerful Nirriti becomes. He pushes Vishnu to pick Kali as the new Brahma, and in doing so makes Yama revolt against Heaven. He pushes the other Gods to allow Sam to preach while held captive in Heaven, hoping to tempt Sam's sympathizers into revealing themselves and ultimately consolidate Heaven's power, but his plan backfires. As the power of the Gods wanes, he tries to maintain his position by betraying them to Nirriti. Asked if he trusts Ganesha, Nirriti replies "Yes, but I would give him his silver afterward", a clear reference to Judas Iscariot, Nirriti being a Christian. Ganesha dies in the final battle. He is very loosely based on the Hindu god of the same name.
- Agni, the god of fire, is a fearsome character armed with a wand that emits the Universal Fire, a stream of plasma which destroys anything it touches. He and Yama were friends prior to Yama joining Sam. The wand itself can only be held by wearing a special outfit and glove, presumably to protect the holder. He also has goggles that enable him to see in infra-red and ultra-violet wavelengths, and for immense distances. It is said he scarred the faces of the moons with his wand, while standing on the ground. The original Agni replaces Shiva after the latter was killed by Sam, and was replaced himself by subsequent 'lesser' Agnis who died one after another. The character is loosely based on the Vedic Hindu god bearing the same name.
- Taraka, Lord of the Rakasha, is a demon, an energy being. Like the rest of his kind he was bound by Sam in the early days, but is set free by Sam as part of a bargain to marshal the demons to oppose the gods. Taraka deceives Sam and possesses his body after his release, resulting in Sam and Taraka simultaneously living in Sam's body. The cohabitation leads them to each gain some of the traits of the other, but the effect is more pronounced upon Taraka, as he learns to feel sorrow, remorse, and guilt. Eventually, out of respect and as a sort of recompense, Taraka 'strengthens the flames' of Sam's soul, enabling him to live as an energy being like the Rakasha do, if he should be killed. Taraka is killed by Yama's death gaze in the final battle, despite Sam's warnings. He is loosely based on the Hindu asura Tārakāsura.
- Nirriti the Black was originally Renfrew, the chaplain of the colonists' ship. A staunch Christian, he is disgusted by the ascendancy of Hinduism on the planet and eventually sets himself up with an army of zombie soldiers to conquer and convert the planet. Nirriti is portrayed as a solo megalomaniac, opposed to the pantheon of the Gods. This character is deeply ironic, a Christian who comes to be known as "The Dark Lord", leader of an army of "Soulless Ones" who have no will of their own but kneel to accompany him in his prayers when so ordered. His final irony is to die in the arms of the false Buddha, Sam. As he dies, he asks for Sam's blessing, which is freely given. He is very loosely based on the later Hindu deity Nirṛti.
- Mara, Lord of Illusion, can project complex illusions across great distances, a power that the Gods use both for entertainment and in battle. He is the one God who can stand against Sam and Yama at Keenset where both exert their full powers, being able to misdirect their attacks. Likewise he frustrates Sam's attempt to escape Heaven by confusing him as to the way out of the dome. Despite this his character is not much in evidence in the novel, only his actions. In the first story he appears in disguise attempting to find out what Yama is doing, but when confronted, apparently unable to use his powers of illusion effectively against Yama within a limited space, the Death God breaks his neck, thus killing him. He is loosely based on the Buddhist demon bearing the same name.
- Krishna is seen only briefly, and as two different characters. He is characterized as a lord of music and dance, and he wields a power of divine drunkenness. He has enormous charisma. Krishna is mostly an apolitical libertine, but was said to be a deadly wrestler who "broke the black demon Bana" during the battles between the colonists and the native inhabitants of the planet, which suggests that he was one of the First. Eventually, disgusted by the abusive practices of the Gods, he joins Sam's efforts to overthrow them. A 'false Krishna' also is mentioned, as when the original Krishna went missing a replacement was found. The original Krishna was loosely based on the Hindu god of the same name. The "false Krishna" mentioned may have been very loosely inspired by the tale of Paundraka Vasudeva, a mortal King in the Bhagavata Purana who believed himself to be Krishna.
- Murugan, who when introduced is a god of youth in an older body and is patiently awaiting a new body during the wedding of Yama and Kali. He meets the real death when his new body is stolen by Sam during the reincarnation process. He is very loosely based on the Hindu god Kartikeya.

== Film version ==
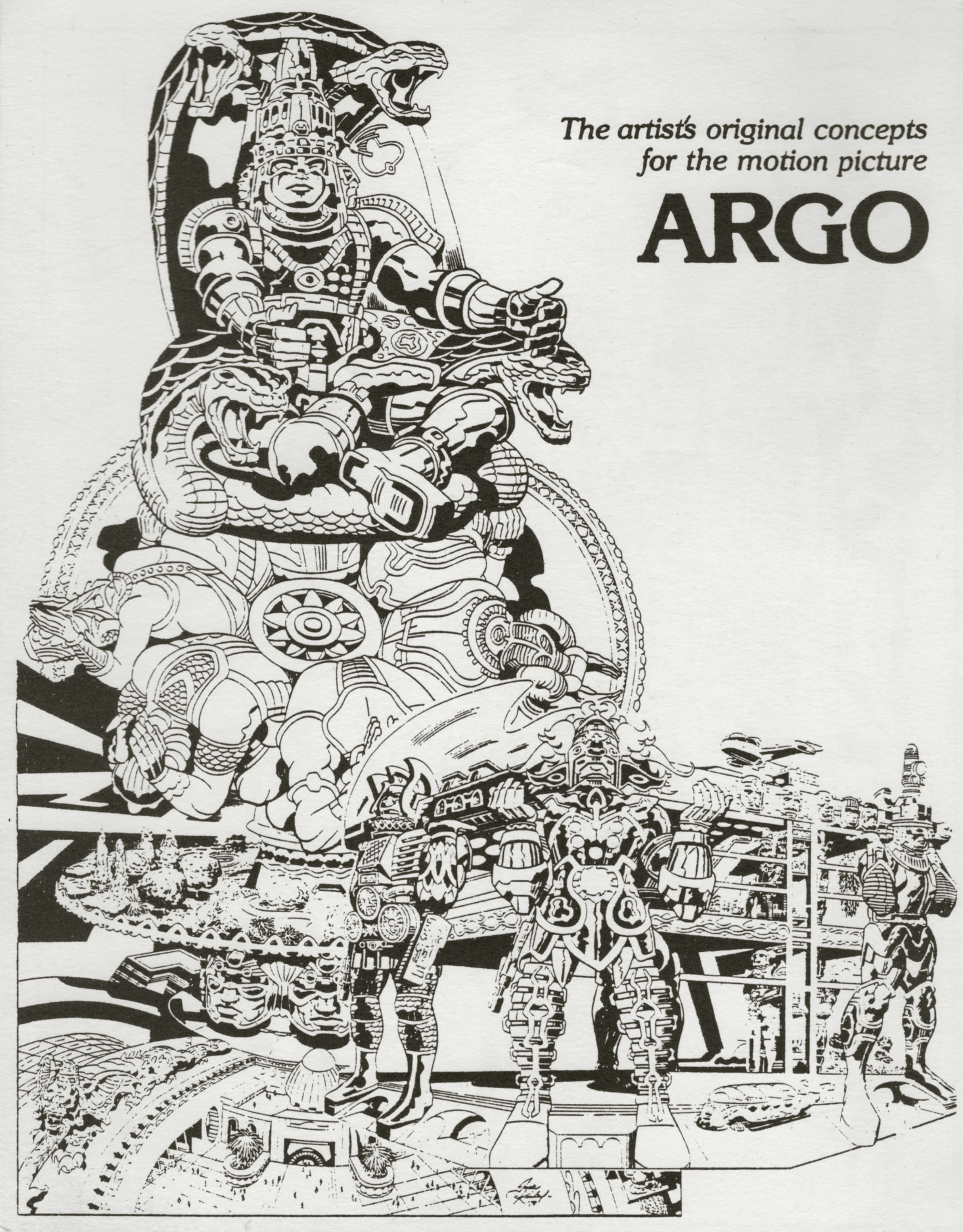
Concept art by Jack Kirby

In 1979, it was announced that Lord of Light would be made into a $50 million film. The movie sets were intended to be made permanent, becoming the core of a science fiction theme park to be built in Aurora, Colorado. Comic book artist Jack Kirby was contracted to produce artwork for set design. Because of legal problems, the project was never completed.

Parts of the unmade film project—the script and Kirby's set designs—were subsequently acquired by the US Central Intelligence Agency (CIA) as cover for the "Canadian Caper": the exfiltration of six US diplomatic staff trapped during the Iranian hostage crisis in 1980 (in Tehran but outside the US embassy compound). The rescue team pretended to be scouting a location in Iran for shooting a Hollywood film from the project script, which they had renamed Argo. The story of the rescue effort was later adapted into the 2012 film Argo.

== TV version ==
In 2017, Universal Cable Productions announced that it would create a television series based on Lord of Light.

== Sources ==
- Levack, Daniel J. H. (1983). Amber Dreams: A Roger Zelazny Bibliography. San Francisco: Underwood/Miller. pp. 50–53. ISBN 0-934438-39-0. OCLC 10344075.
