= A Rose for Ecclesiastes =

1963 short story by Roger Zelazny

"A Rose For Ecclesiastes"
- Short story by Roger Zelazny
- Story illustration by Hannes Bok for the cover of The Magazine of Fantasy & Science Fiction (November 1963)
- Language: English
- Genre: Science fiction

Publication
- Published in: The Magazine of Fantasy & Science Fiction
- Publication type: Periodical
- Publication date: November 1963

"A Rose for Ecclesiastes" is a science fiction short story by American author Roger Zelazny, first published in the November 1963 issue of The Magazine of Fantasy and Science Fiction, with a special wraparound cover painting by Hannes Bok. The story was nominated for the 1964 Hugo Award for Best Short Fiction.

== Plot summary ==
The story is narrated by a gifted human linguist and poet named Gallinger, who is part of a mission studying Mars. He becomes the first human to learn the "high language" of the intelligent Martians, and to be allowed to read their sacred texts. He comes to believe that Martian culture is essentially fatalistic, following an event in the distant past that left the long-lived Martians sterile.

The Martian high priestess regards Gallinger highly, and over the course of months, his theological and poetical discussion elevate him to a status something like a prophet. Ultimately, he is seduced by a Martian temple dancer and impregnates her, the first such pregnancy on the planet in hundreds of years. The Martians appear not to take this well, as it contradicts their religion's expectation of extinction.

Gallinger sets out to do two things: he translates the Biblical book of Ecclesiastes, which he finds thematically similar to their religious texts, into the High Tongue. As part of the cultural exchange he engages in with the High Priestess, he promises to bring her a rose, since the Martians have never seen one. The ship's biologist grows a rose and gives it to Gallinger.

In anger at Martian religious fatalism and impassioned by his love for the dancer and his child-to-be, Gallinger breaks into the temple during a closed service and reads to the Martians from his translation of Ecclesiastes. He mocks it as he reads it, stating:

He was right! It is vanity; it is pride! It is the hubris of rationalism to always attack the prophet, the mystic, the god. It is our blasphemy which has made us great, and will sustain us, and which the gods secretly admire in us. —And the truly sacred names of God are blasphemous things to speak!

He discovers that the Martian religion is more complicated than he had originally realized, as is his role in fulfilling prophecy. It has been prophesied that a stranger will "go shod in the temple", breaking in without removing all unclean items, restoring life to the Martian race and bringing something new. His actions have brought life, and the High Priestess takes the rose vowing to learn how to grow the flower.

The story ends well for the Martians, though perhaps less so for Gallinger, who discovers his dancer was only fulfilling her religious duty by seducing him, not caring for him otherwise. He attempts suicide, but, when he wakes up, he is in the infirmary, and he sees Mars through a port, growing farther away as the ship leaves Mars to return to Earth.

== Reception and reprinting ==
"A Rose for Ecclesiastes" has been anthologized in several collections, including the following:

- Isaac Asimov Presents the Great SF Stories #25 (edited by Isaac Asimov and Martin H. Greenberg)
- The Doors of His Face, The Lamps of His Mouth, and Other Stories
- Science Fiction: The Science Fiction Research Association Anthology (edited by Patricia S. Warrick, Charles Waugh, and Martin H. Greenberg)

It is regarded as one of Zelazny's best early stories and was included in The Science Fiction Hall of Fame Volume One, 1929-1964, an anthology of the best science fiction short stories before 1965, as judged by the Science Fiction Writers of America. The story has been viewed as an important example of New Wave stylistics.

R. D. Mullen described the story as "perhaps the best story ever on Mars as a dying world". Judith Merril praised it as "incomparable". Samuel R. Delany characterized the story as a "wonderful and magical tale". The Oxford Companion to Twentieth-century Literature in English declares the story "rewrote the cliches of science fiction into augurs of renewal". Theodore Sturgeon called the story "one of the most beautifully written, skillfully composed and passionately expressed works of art to appear anywhere, ever." In an essay for The New York Times, Sturgeon wrote about the story:

One of the highest tributes I have ever heard paid to a writer lies in the words of a young lady who said, 'I knew, halfway through the second paragraph, that I was in good hands.' Science fiction has produced many such pairs of hands, and I genuinely envy those who have yet to encounter... Roger Zelazny, who dares to place an arrogant poet as an essential member of a Mars expedition and have him use Ecclesiastes to establish cultural contact."

"A Rose for Ecclesiastes" was included in Visions of Mars: First Library on Mars, a silica glass mini-DVD that was taken to Mars by the Phoenix space probe in 2008.

== In popular culture ==
Novelist and musician Steven Brust, a lifelong Zelazny fan, named his 1993 solo album A Rose for Iconoclastes after "A Rose for Ecclesiastes".
