= Roger Zelazny =

American writer and poet (1937–1995)

- Zelazny in 1988
- Born: Roger Joseph Zelazny; May 13, 1937; Euclid, Ohio, U.S.
- Died: June 14, 1995 (aged 58); Santa Fe, New Mexico, U.S.
- Education: Western Reserve University (B.A.); Columbia University (M.A.)
- Occupation: Writer
- Writing career
- Pen name: Harrison Denmark
- Genres: Fantasy, science fiction
- Notable works: Lord of Light, The Chronicles of Amber, Isle of the Dead, The Doors of His Face, The Lamps of His Mouth, and Other Stories, Doorways in the Sand, Eye of Cat, Unicorn Variations, A Night in the Lonesome October
- Movement: New Wave (although he denounced the term himself)

Roger Joseph Zelazny (May 13, 1937 – June 14, 1995) was an American fantasy and science fiction writer known for his short stories and novels focusing on mythology and various religions; he is perhaps best known for The Chronicles of Amber series. He won the Nebula Award three times (out of 14 nominations) and the Hugo Award six times (also out of 14 nominations), including two Hugos for novels: the serial novel ...And Call Me Conrad (1965), subsequently published as This Immortal (1966), and Lord of Light (1967).

== Biography ==
Zelazny was born in Euclid, Ohio, the only child of Polish immigrant Joseph Frank Żelazny and Irish American Josephine Flora Sweet. In high school, he became the editor of the school newspaper and joined the Creative Writing Club. In the fall of 1955, he began attending Western Reserve University and graduated with a B.A. in English in 1959. He was accepted to Columbia University in New York, and he specialized in Elizabethan and Jacobean drama, graduating with an M.A. in 1962. His dissertation was titled Two Traditions and Cyril Tourneur: an Examination of Morality and Humor Comedy Conventions in "The Revenger's Tragedy".

Between 1962 and 1969, he worked for the U.S. Social Security Administration in Cleveland, Ohio, and then in Baltimore, Maryland, spending his evenings writing science fiction. He deliberately progressed from short-shorts to novelettes to novellas and finally to novel-length works by 1965. On May 1, 1969, he quit his job to become a full-time writer, and thereafter he concentrated on writing novels in order to maintain his income. During this period, he was an active and vocal member of the Baltimore Science Fiction Society, whose members included the writer Jack L. Chalker, in addition to Joe and Jack Haldeman, among others.

His first appearance in a fanzine was with part one of the story "Conditional Benefit" (Thurban 1 #3, 1953); his first professional publication and sale was the fantasy short story "Mr. Fuller's Revolt" (Literary Calvalcade, 1954). As a professional writer, his debut works were the simultaneous publication of "Passion Play" (Amazing, August 1962) and "Horseman!" (Fantastic, August 1962). "Passion Play" was written and sold first. His first story to attract major attention was "A Rose for Ecclesiastes", published in The Magazine of Fantasy & Science Fiction, with cover art by Hannes Bok.

Roger Zelazny was also a member of the Swordsmen and Sorcerers' Guild of America (SAGA), a loose-knit group of heroic fantasy authors founded in the 1960s, some of whose works were anthologized in Lin Carter's Flashing Swords! anthologies.

== Personal life and death ==
Zelazny was married twice—first to Sharon Steberl in 1964 (divorced, no children), and then to Judith Alene Callahan in 1966. Before this period, he was engaged to folk singer Hedy West for six months from 1961 to 1962. Roger and Judith had two sons, Devin and Trent (1976–2024), who was an author of crime fiction, and a daughter, Shannon. At the time of his death, Roger and Judith were separated, and he was living with author Jane Lindskold.

Raised as a Catholic by his parents, Zelazny later declared himself a lapsed Catholic and remained that way for the rest of his life. "I did have a strong Catholic background, but I am not a Catholic. Somewhere in the past, I believe I answered in the affirmative once for strange and complicated reasons. But I am not a member of any organized religion."

Zelazny died, aged 58, in Santa Fe on June 14, 1995, of kidney failure secondary to colorectal cancer. At the time of his death, he had been a resident of Santa Fe for twenty years.

== Themes ==
In his stories, Zelazny frequently portrayed characters from myth, depicted in the modern or a future world. Mythological traditions that his fiction borrowed from include the following:

- Chinese mythology, in Lord Demon (with Jane Lindskold)
- Egyptian mythology, in Creatures of Light and Darkness
- Greek mythology, in ...And Call Me Conrad
- Hindu mythology, in Lord of Light
- Navajo mythology, in Eye of Cat
- Norse mythology, in The Mask of Loki
- Psychoanalysis, Arthurian mythos, Norse mythology and Kabbalah, in The Dream Master

Additionally, elements from Norse, Japanese and Irish mythology, Arthurian legend, and real history appear in The Chronicles of Amber series. The novel A Night in the Lonesome October involves the Cthulhu Mythos, a shared fictional universe based on the work of H. P. Lovecraft.

Another recurring motif of Zelazny's is the "absent father" (or father-figure). Again, this motif occurs most notably in the Amber novels: in the first Amber series, the protagonist Corwin searches for his lost, god-like father Oberon; in the second series, which focuses on Corwin's son Merlin (not to be confused with the Arthurian Merlin), Corwin himself is strangely missing. This somewhat Freudian theme runs through almost every Zelazny novel to some degree. The novels Roadmarks, Doorways in the Sand, Changeling, Madwand and A Dark Traveling; the short stories "Dismal Light", "Godson" and "The Keys to December"; and the Alien Speedway series all feature main characters who are either searching for or have lost their fathers. Zelazny's father, Joseph, died unexpectedly in 1962 and never knew of his son's successes as a writer.

Two other personal characteristics that influenced Zelazny's fiction were his expertise in martial arts and his addiction to tobacco. Zelazny became an expert with the épée in college; he thereby began a lifelong study of several martial arts, including judo, aikido (which he later taught as well, having gained a black belt), tai chi and baguazhang. In turn, many of his characters ably and knowledgeably use similar skills while dispatching their opponents. Zelazny was also a passionate cigarette and pipe smoker (until he quit in the early 1980s)—so much so that he made many of his protagonists heavy smokers as well. However, he quit in order to improve his cardiovascular fitness for the martial arts; once he had quit, characters in his later novels and short stories stopped smoking also.

Zelazny also often experimented with form in his stories. The novel Doorways in the Sand practices a flashback technique in which most chapters open with a scene, typically involving peril, not implied by the end of the previous chapter. Once this scene is established, the narrator backtracks to the events leading up to it, and then he follows through to the end of the chapter, whereupon the next chapter jumps ahead to another dramatic non sequitur.

In Roadmarks, a novel about a road system that links all possible times, places and histories, the chapters that feature the protagonist are all titled "One". Other chapters, titled "Two", feature secondary characters, including original characters, pulp heroes and real historical figures. The "One" storyline is fairly linear, whereas the "Two" storyline jumps around in time and sequence. After finishing the manuscript, Zelazny shuffled the "Two" chapters randomly among the "One" chapters in order to emphasize their non-linear nature relative to the storyline.

The novel Creatures of Light and Darkness, featuring characters in the personas of Egyptian gods, uses a narrative voice entirely in the present tense; the final chapter is structured as a play, and several chapters take the form of long poems.

Another common stylistic approach in Zelazny's novels is the use of mixed genres, whereby elements of each are combined freely and interchangeably. The novels Jack of Shadows and Changeling, for example, revolve around the tensions between the two worlds of magic and technology. The novel Lord of Light, perhaps one of his most famous works, is written in the classic style of a mythic fantasy, while it is established early in the book that the story itself takes place on a colonized planet.

== Legacy ==
Zelazny's stories inspired other authors in his generation including Samuel R. Delany, whose novel Nova and many of his short stories were written "partly in response to Zelazny’s eruption into the field." In 1967, Algis Budrys listed Zelazny, Delany, J. G. Ballard and Brian Aldiss as "an earthshaking new kind of" writer, and leaders of the New Wave. Neil Gaiman said that Zelazny was the author who influenced him most, with this influence particularly seen in Gaiman's literary style and subjects. Andrzej Sapkowski considered Zelazny to be his spiritual teacher, whose work inspired him to write his first novel.

The anthology Lord of the Fantastic: Stories in Honor of Roger Zelazny, edited by Martin H. Greenberg and released in 1998, featured essays and stories in honor of Zelazny by Walter Jon Williams, Jack Williamson, John Varley, Gaiman, Gregory Benford and many other authors.

The anthology Shadows & Reflections: A Roger Zelazny Tribute Anthology, edited by Trent Zelazny and Warren Lapine, was released in 2017; it featured two essays and fifteen stories set in universes that Zelazny created. Contributors included Zelazny, George R. R. Martin, Shannon Zelazny, Warren Lapine, Steven Brust, Kelly McCullough, Jane Lindskold, Steve Perry, Gerald Hausman, Lawrence Watt-Evans, Michael H. Hanson, Mark Rich, Gio Clairval, Edward J. McFadden III, Theodore Krulik, Shariann Lewitt and Jay O'Connell.

== Awards ==
Zelazny won at least 16 awards for specific works of fiction: six Hugo Awards, three Nebula Awards, two Locus Awards, one Prix Tour-Apollo Award, two Seiun Awards and two Balrog Awards. Often Zelazny's works competed with each other for the same award.

- ...And Call Me Conrad (published in book form as This Immortal) won the 1966 Hugo Award (novel), a tie with Dune by Frank Herbert.
- "The Doors of His Face, the Lamps of His Mouth" won the 1966 Nebula Award (novelette).
- "He Who Shapes" tied for the 1966 Nebula Award (novella).
- Lord of Light won the 1968 Hugo Award (novel).
- Isle of the Dead won the 1972 Prix Tour-Apollo Award (novel).
- This Immortal won the 1976 Seiun Award (foreign novel).
- "Home Is the Hangman" won both the 1976 Hugo Award and the 1976 Nebula Award (novella).
- "The Last Defender of Camelot" won the 1980 Balrog Award (short fiction).
- "Unicorn Variation" won the 1982 Hugo Award (novelette) and the 1984 Seiun Award (foreign short fiction).
- Unicorn Variations won the 1984 Locus Award (collection) and the 1984 Balrog Award (collection/anthology).
- "24 Views of Mt. Fuji, by Hokusai" won the 1986 Hugo Award (novella).
- Trumps of Doom won the 1986 Locus Award (fantasy novel).
- "Permafrost" won the 1987 Hugo Award (novelette).

In addition, Zelazny was the Guest of Honor at the Worldcon convention in Washington, D.C., in 1974 (also known as Discon II); he won an Inkpot Award for lifetime achievement at the San Diego Comic-Con convention in 1993. "A Rose for Ecclesiastes" was included in Visions of Mars: First Library on Mars, a DVD taken on board the Phoenix Mars lander in 2008.

== Tributes ==
The ostracod (class of crustaceans) Sclerocypris zelaznyi was named after Zelazny.
