= List of fictional feral children =

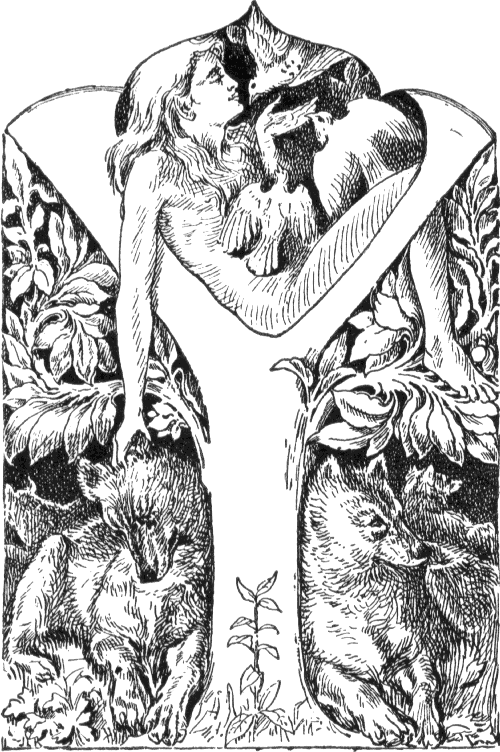
Mowgli (by John Lockwood Kipling), represents the modern idea of a feral child.

Feral children, children who have lived from a young age without human contact, appear in mythological and fictional works, usually raised by animals. Often their dual heritage is a benefit to them, protecting them from the corrupting influence of human society, such as in Tarzan's case. It may also permit the development and expression of their own animal nature, for example Enkidu, or providing access to the wisdom and lore by which animals survive in the wild, for example Mowgli.

In most tales, the child is lost or abandoned. They are then found and adopted in a chance encounter with a sympathetic wild animal. In some stories, the child chooses to abandon human society (Note: such as in Where The Wild Things Are) or refuses to enter society altogether. (Note: Peter Pan) The child usually returns to civilization, but may decide to return again to life in the wild. (Note: Tarzan) In some cases, they find themselves trapped between worlds, unable to enter entirely into either human society or animal society. (Note: Mowgli)

== In mythology, folklore, and ancient literature ==
- Enkidu, raised by unspecified beasts, becomes the friend of the hero Gilgamesh in the Epic of Gilgamesh.
- In Greek mythology, Atalanta was raised by a female bear after her father abandoned her in a forest until the day she was found by kindly hunters.
- Romulus and Remus, legendary founders of Rome, were suckled by a female wolf.
- The Iranian Shahnameh "The Book of Kings / The king of books", introduces Zaal, the mythical hero of Iran, raised by Simurgh, a very large and wise bird.
- In Ibn Tufail's Hayy ibn Yaqdhan, Hayy is raised by a gazelle on a desert island and becomes an autodidactic philosopher.
- In Ibn al-Nafis' Theologus Autodidactus, Kamil is also raised by animals on a deserted island, and becomes an autodidactic scientist and theologian.
- In Mongolian Oirat and Kalmyk mythology, the hero Jangar is taught to roar by a tiger, taught to hunt by an eagle, taught to run by antelope, suckled by female wolves, and fed fruit by deer.
- In a Polish fairy tale, Waligóra and Wyrwidąb were two warrior and dragonslayer brothers, who were brought up in the woods by a wolf and a bear.
- According to American folklore, Pecos Bill was raised by coyotes.

== In modern prose ==
- In 1879, Albert Robida created Saturnin Farandoul, a child raised by orangutans who becomes king of the apes.
- H. Rider Haggard's 1889 novelette "Allan's Wife" features the antagonist Hendrika, a white Boer child who was stolen and raised by baboons. She is later rescued and "civilized" by an English family, but she retains baboon-like behavior and the ability to communicate with baboons.
- The protagonist of Rudyard Kipling's 1894 short story collection The Jungle Book, Mowgli, is raised by wolves and becomes the ruler of the jungle.
- Peter Pan, created by J. M. Barrie in 1902, is a boy raised by birds and fairies who fled to the magical Neverland and refused to grow up.
- The Blue Lagoon, created by H. de Vere Stacpoole in (1908) tells the story of two English children, a boy and a girl, stranded on a deserted tropical island in Polynesia.
    - The Garden of God (1923), a sequel to The Blue Lagoon, features a new British child couple, descendants of the couple from the previous book generated by incest, who live a new adventure on the same Polynesian island.
- Tarzan, of Edgar Rice Burroughs' Tarzan of the Apes (1912), is an orphan raised by apes.
- The German trilogy Die Höhlenkinder (1918-1920) by Alois Theodor Sonnleitner is about two children who grow up in a hidden area cut off from the outside world without adults, after they had to flee because their grandmother was accused to be a witch. Later they have a son who finds his way back.
- Shasta of the Wolves (1919) by Olaf Baker, in which a Native American boy is raised by a pack of Cascade mountain wolves in the Pacific Northwest.
- Jungle Born (1924) by John Eyton, in which a boy raised by rhesus macaques in northern India inadvertently saves a teenage girl from her abusive father.
- The House Without Windows & Eepersip's Life There (1927) by Barbara Newhall Follett, in which Eepersip runs away from home to live in idyllic Nature (successively, a meadow, the sea, and, finally, the mountains).
- White Deer (1947) by Vladimir Nazor, in which a six-year-old girl named Anka is lost in the forest while herding a flock of geese. She is adopted by deer and soon befriends most animals in the forest. Her main antagonist is a wolf, while her closest ally is a white deer. After growing up she becomes a powerful forest-warrior who helps both animals and humans living in the forest.
- In Robert A. Heinlein's 1961 novel Stranger in a Strange Land, Valentine Michael Smith is a human raised by Martians on Mars, as he returns to Earth in early adulthood. The novel explores his interaction with — and eventual transformation of — human culture.
- In Boris and Arkady Strugatsky's 1971 novel The Little One (also known as Space Mowgli), a human from Earth, Piere Semyonov, has been raised by an alien non-humanoid civilization after his parents' spaceship crashed onto an uncharted planet. After his discovery by Terran scientists, several attempts to integrate him back to human society were undertaken, but all were in vain.
- The theme of young adolescent runaways seeking shelter with wild animals and learning their ways is seen in novels such as the Newbery Medal-winning novel Julie of the Wolves by Jean Craighead George (1972).
- Philip José Farmer's anthology Mother Was A Lovely Beast: A Feral Man Anthology, Fiction And Fact About Humans Raised By Animals (1974) collects several stories of fictional feral children.
- Jane Yolen's Passager (1996), the first of the Young Merlin trilogy of short novels, depicts a slightly more realistic view of such childhood. Abandoned in a Welsh forest at the age of seven years, the boy who will become Merlin lives in the forest for a year nearly as well as its natives, until a falconer who is used to domesticating animals captures him and begins the long and difficult task of educating him in human behavior.
- In Karen Hesse's The Music of Dolphins (1996), a young girl called Mila is found after having been raised by dolphins for over a decade. In the book, Mila is taken to a clinic with other undomesticated human young, none of whom adapt to mainstream humanity as easily as she does. At the end of the book, Mila returns to the dolphin pod, showing her rejection of human society.
- In the "Firekeeper Saga" starting with Through Wolf's Eyes (2001) by author Jane Lindskold, the family of a young girl named Firekeeper and her colony are killed by a fire, and she is the only survivor. She is then taken in by the "Royal Wolves" who speak their own language with gestures and signals. Because Firekeeper had already learned a human language before going to live with the wolves, she was able to return to human society and became a valuable asset to the royalty, but she found that humans were not as noble as the wolves she loved as family.
- Wild Angel (2001) by Pat Murphy tells the story of a young girl raised by wolves from the age of four in gold-rush-era California.
- World War Z by Max Brooks contain many references to feral children - in this case, children who were separated from normal humanity at some point during the zombie war, and were forced to live in the wild, contending not just with the problems of survival but also the hazard posed by the walking dead. The novel suggests they formed a kind of rudimentary social or "pack" structure with basic tool-using abilities, and in most cases were capable of being slowly rehabilitated.
- In the 2006 book Dogboy by Victor Kelleher, a young boy is abandoned at birth by his mother and is raised by a half domestic dog in a litter of puppies. He is later brought back to a nearby human settlement by the dog, searching for a home with her owner once again, and her only surviving pup but is rejected as an abomination.
- Camilla Way's 2008 novel Little Bird concerns a girl kidnapped as a toddler by a mute and held captive until the age of twelve.
- In 2009 Eva Hornung's novel Dogboy, set in Moscow, tells the story of two feral children who live with a pack of dogs. One of the children was abandoned at the age of 4 and the other was brought to the lair as a baby by the dominant female in the pack. The children eventually come under the notice of two scientists working in a centre that rehabilitates abandoned children.
- The Dictator's Moustaches, a 2009 Italian novel by Anna Russo, concerns an abandoned baby rescued and brought up by dogs.
- Magic Hour by Kristin Hannah concerns a young girl who appears out of the forest, with no information as to her origins. She is called "wolf girl"; she is cared for and eventually loved by fallen psychologist Julia.
- In Victor Robert Lee's 2013 novel Performance Anomalies, protagonist Cono 7Q becomes an orphan as a young boy in northeast Brazil, surviving alone in the forest by hunting small animals.

== In comics ==
- "The Wild Wonders" in the 1970s British comic book series Valiant are two boys lost on a Scottish island and raised in a normal environment, developing their own language. Returned to human civilization at about a decade old, they become superb athletes and enjoy many comic adventures.
- In "Fishboy", written by Scott Goodall, (1968 - 1975 in Buster), the hero of the title was abandoned on a remote island as a baby, implausibly learned how to breathe underwater and to communicate with aquatic fauna, and grew webbed fingers and toes.
- Goodall also created "Kid Chameleon" (1970–1972) in Cor!! Raised by reptiles in the Kalahari Desert after the murder of his parents, Kid Chameleon wears a suit of lizard scales that can change color to camouflage him like his namesake the chameleon.
- The French comic book (bande dessinée) Pyrénée (1998), by Regis Loisel and Philippe Sternis, features a girl who is raised by a bear and taught wisdom by a blind old eagle in the French Pyrenees, the bear having named her after the mountains without the "s". This story has won critical acclaim and has been translated into German and Dutch, but has also drawn some criticism over the girl's nudity.
- Little Dee is a webcomic where a prevocal human who was lost in a forest is adopted by a bear, dog, and vulture. The strip contains purely fantastic elements (the characters live in a cave but occasionally fly planes or cook food) and focuses more on the natives and their issues of handling a human.
- In DC Comics' Elseworlds story Superman: The Feral Man of Steel (1994), Kal-El (Clark Kent) is raised by wolves in 19th century India, in an homage to The Jungle Book, until he is discovered by an expedition led by Lex Luthor and Lois Lane and brought back to Britain.
- In the Marvel Comics universe, a Tarzan-inspired character Ka-Zar is raised by a Smilodon named Zabu in the Savage Land, a vast tropical jungle hidden from the world in the depths of Antarctica. He goes on to have many adventures including features in the X-Men series, where he also has some encounters with Spider-Man.
- The Quality Comics hero Black Condor, was a boy raised in Mongolia by highly intelligent condors, gains the improbable power of flight and later becomes a superhero. Secret Origins #21 revealed that Condor's flight ability was due to a radioactive meteorite near the condors' nest.
- Holyoke Publishing's hero Cat-Man was orphaned at a young age and raised by Burmese tigers. He adapted to life in the wild by developing super-strength, enhanced vision, and other talents which served him well when he returned to the US and became a superhero.
- The Hexagon Comics hero Zembla was a boy raised by lions.
- Trolls de Troy features a human girl named Waha, who was accidentally raised by Trolls from infancy.
- In the Japanese manga Demon Slayer: Kimetsu no Yaiba, Inosuke Hashibara was raised by wild boars, wearing the hide of his boar mother after her death.
- In Xenozoic Tales, Jack and Hannah befriend a wild boy raised by the lizard-like Grith, after being saved by a pack of cave hyenas.
- In Homestuck, Jade Harley accidentally shot and killed her adoptive grandfather on an isolated tropical island when she was a baby, leaving her to be raised by the dog-like entity Becquerel.

== In film ==
These films have fiction and two are based on true stories:

- King of the Jungle, a 1933 film directed by H. Bruce Humberstone and Max Marcin features a three-year-old boy (Ronnie Cosbey) who is raised by a lioness after his parents die in a plane crash flying over Africa. He grows up to become known as Kaspa the Lion Man (Buster Crabbe).
- Mara of the Wilderness, a 1965 film directed by Frank McDonald features Mara Wade (played by Lori Saunders) who is raised by wolves in the Alaskan wilderness after her parents are killed in a bear attack.
- L'Enfant Sauvage (The Wild Child), a 1970 French film directed by François Truffaut, is based on the true story of Victor of Aveyron (played by Jean-Pierre Cargol), a mute feral boy discovered in the Aveyron region of 18th century France. A doctor (played by Truffaut) tries to socialize the boy. Based on the account of Dr. Jean Marc Gaspard Itard.
- In the 1977 Mexican "clone of Tarzan" film El Rey de los Gorilas (The King of Gorillas), also known as El Simio Blanco (The White Ape), directed by René Cardona Jr., a baby survives in a canoe that drifts away from the "Black Forest", the territory of the fearsome cannibal tribe called "The Plant Men". The gorilla that found the baby tore off the baby's clothes and the baby boy was naked. The narrator named him Ape. He grew up in a green loincloth with back length hair as a 12-year-old child and later sported a beard, shoulder blade-length hair, and a different loincloth as a man. Ape rescued a woman named Eva from the Plant Men to the jungle and they fell in love. Some months later, they had a son.
- The Blue Lagoon, a 1980 film directed by Randal Kleiser, is an adaptation of the novel. A previous film adaptation of the story was directed by Frank Launder and released in 1949.
- In the Kennedy–Miller 1981 film Mad Max 2, a boy called the "Feral Kid" (portrayed by Emil Minty) lives in the wasteland near the refinery settlement. He flips, growls when displeased and has a fascination for the Gyro Captain's autogyro. The Feral Kid wears shorts and boots made from hide, hunts and defends himself using a lethal metal boomerang.
- The 1982 Italian comedy Bingo Bongo features a man who grew up among chimpanzees in the African jungle after escaping a plane crash as a baby.
- Walk Like a Man, a 1987 comedy film directed by Melvin Frank, features a man named Robert "Bobo" Shand (played by Howie Mandel) who was raised by wild dogs after being abandoned as an infant by his older brother in Alaska.
- In the 1992 Tim Burton film Batman Returns, the film's version of Penguin spent his childhood among penguins in Gotham City's sewers after being abandoned by his parents due to his deformity and vicious nature as an infant.
- Bad Boy Bubby is a 1993 Australian film by director Rolf de Heer in which the title character is subjected to lifelong social isolation by his mother. Events in the film lead Bubby to venture into the world where many of his interactions take on a darkly comical aspect.
- In the 1994 Brian Levant film The Flintstones, Barney (played by Rick Moranis) and Betty Rubble (played by Rosie O'Donnell) adopt a feral child named Bamm-Bamm (played by Hlynur Sigurðsson and Marinó Sigurðsson), who was raised by wild mastodons.
- In the 1994 film The Secret of Roan Inish, Fiona's brother, Jamie was thought to be lost at sea as an infant but was raised by a seal-like creature called a selkie.
- Nell is a 1994 film in which a young woman (portrayed by Jodie Foster) is raised by her extremely androphobic mother in an isolated cabin, and has to face other human beings for the first time after her mother's death.
- The title character of Hayao Miyazaki's 1997 anime film Princess Mononoke, San, was raised by a wolf goddess along with her two wolf pups.
- In the Tarzan parody George of the Jungle, the main protagonist George (as depicted in the 1997 live-action film) was lost after a plane crash and raised by an ape named "APE" who could speak in human language, read books, and play the violin.
- In the 2005 film The Adventures of Sharkboy and Lavagirl directed by Robert Rodriguez, Sharkboy (portrayed by Taylor Lautner) is a young warrior who was raised by sharks after he was separated from his father, a marine biologist, when a waterspout sunk their floating laboratory. He has many shark-like adaptations to his body including gills, fins, sharpened teeth, claws (although they seem to only be attached to his gloves), peak strength, highly trained sense of hearing, strong sense of smell, agility, reflexes and swimming ability. Sharkboy can also communicate with marine life and is not affected by deep sea pressure.
- In the 2007 Barbie doll film Barbie as the Island Princess, six-year-old Ro is shipwrecked on an island and raised by a red panda, a peacock, and an elephant. Ro has no memory of her past, and ten years later, a prince discovers the island and takes her back to his kingdom. She is later revealed to be a princess who was lost at sea.
- The central heroine of the 2007 Disney Princess parody Enchanted, Giselle (played by Amy Adams), was raised by animals of the forest, including her chipmunk companion Pip (as it is revealed in her backstory in 2022 sequel Disenchanted). While she's not feral, she lived in a treehouse cottage with her animal friends and also sang with them, until she was transported to New York City by the evil Queen Narissa (played by Susan Sarandon).
- In the 2013 horror film Mama, young girls Victoria and Lilly are raised in the forest for 5 years by a spirit they call "Mama" after the spirit killed their depressed father. When they are discovered by trackers hired by their uncle and brought back to society, Victoria is able to reintegrate while Lily (whose only memories are of being raised in the forest and who sees the spirit as her true mother) is not.
- In the 2013 Disney film Frozen, an 8-year-old boy named Kristoff (voiced by Tyree Brown) had been raised along with his reindeer pet, Sven, by Rock Trolls in a valley until he grew up and left them to start his career as an ice harvester.
- In the 2014 film Barefoot, the character Daisy Kensington (portrayed by Evan Rachel Wood) was raised in isolation all of her life and has been barefoot since childhood.
- In the 2014 film The Boxtrolls, the main character Eggs (voiced by Isaac Hempstead Wright) is raised by the title characters in their underground cavernous home following the kidnapping of his father when he was a baby.
- In the 2015 film The Good Dinosaur, a 7-year-old feral caveboy named Spot (voiced by Jack Bright) befriends the main character Arlo, an Apatosaurus. He behaves like a dog.
- In the 2016 film Storks, a girl named Tulip (voiced by Katie Crown) is the only human among the storks at Cornerstore on Stork Mountain after her homing location beacon was accidentally destroyed and was kept on Stork Mountain until she turned 18 to be returned to the human world but instead helps a top delivery stork deliver an unauthorized baby.
- In the 2020 Pokémon film Pokémon the Movie: Secrets of the Jungle, Ash and Pikachu discover a feral boy named Koko, raised by a Mythical Pokémon called Zarude.
- In the 2021 Disney film Raya and the Last Dragon, Noi was raised in the streets of Talon by the monkey-like Orginis after the Druun petrified her mother.
- In the 2022 film Puss in Boots: The Last Wish, Goldilocks was raised by the Three Bears Crime Family.
- In the 2022 Russian animated film Dolphin Boy, a young boy was raised by infancy by a mother dolphin and her calf.

== In television ==
- The titular protagonist in Toei Animation's first anime show Wolf Boy Ken was raised by wolves in the jungle of the Himalayas. He acts as a guardian of mischievous twin wolf cubs, Chichi and Poppo, and is a frenemy to Jack, the one-eyed wolf.
- In the Gilligan's Island 1965 episode "Gilligan Meets Jungle Boy," Gilligan encounters a young boy (portrayed by Kurt Russell) living in the jungles of the island wearing only a loincloth/short shorts. In the end, the jungle boy unknowingly takes off in a balloon and lands on a Navy carrier. The radio news states that he only knows the words "boy boy, girl girl, no no."
- The protagonist of the 1977–78 American television series Lucan was a young man who had been raised by wolves in Northern Minnesota and then captured/rescued by a research institute which spent ten years acclimatizing him to civilized society.
- In The Six Million Dollar Man 1975 episode "The Wolf Boy," there was a boy named Gary (portrayed by Buddy Foster) who was reported to be living with wolves on the Japanese island of Hoyoko wearing what's left of his pants.
- In the Tales of the Gold Monkey 1983 episode "Ape Boy", a young man was raised by a fictional species of monkey who mistook main character Sarah to be his real mother, though Sarah, Jake and Corky reunite him with a relative.
- In Bigfoot and Wildboy, Wildboy (played by Joseph Butcher) was raised by the titular Sasquatch Bigfoot (played by Ray Young).
- In the second episode of the original Star Trek, "Charlie X", the Enterprise takes aboard the title character, a 17-year-old boy named Charlie, the sole survivor of a crash on a remote planet which occurred in his infancy. He claims to have survived and learned language via the ship's computer records, but in actuality was taken in by an advanced alien race, who taught him psychic abilities.
- Smurfs introduced a character called "Wild Smurf" who was stranded in the forest when a rainstorm caused the stork to lose the baby Smurf, whereupon he was raised by a family of squirrels. Wild Smurf can only speak in the squirrels' language and is at home in the forest, but eventually learns to befriend and interact with his fellow Smurfs, who in turn appreciate his wilderness survival abilities in dangerous situations.
- Some TV shows involving Michael Berk and Douglas Schwartz had feral children in an episode:
  - In the Manimal 1983 episode "Female of the Species", a boat accident on the Ganges River in 1969 caused by Stanford Langly (portrayed by Michael McGuire) kills the parents of the four-year-old Sarah Evers, causing her to be raised by wolves and living in the Sultanpur district's forests naked, untamed, and acting less than human. When the long-haired wolf girl (portrayed by Laura Cushing) at age 14 is captured years later by a hunting party led by Professor Barta (portrayed by Rick Jason), she is the subject at his university and has been dressed in a jungle bikini since she rips whatever clothes they offer her. Stanford tries to orchestrate another attempt on her life which is thwarted by Jonathan Chase. Jonathan manages to protect her and gain her trust.
  - A similar plotline occurred in The Wizard episode "Endangered Species". An accident in 1977 caused by Mr. Deshays (portrayed by Gerald Gordon) had happened to the parents of a three-year-old Linda Winthrope, causing her to be raised by wolves and living in the Sultanpur district's forests naked, untamed, filthy, and acting less than human. When the wolf girl (portrayed by Priscilla Weems) at age 9 is captured, she becomes a subject at the university where she is held and has been dressed in a leopard-skinned dress since she rips whatever clothes is offered to it. She ends up nearly killed by someone hired by Mr. Deshays and gains the trust of Simon McKay.
  - In the 1994 Thunder in Paradise episode "Endangered Species", an ill-fated expedition had left a 3-year old Tommy Ralston orphaned and raised by wolves. Some years later, poachers have found Tommy Ralston (played by Alexander Sommer) at age 6 old living with wolves while hunting and managed to catch him. He is freed by Randolph J. Spencer who makes it his mission to find out the boy's identity and find out who wants him dead.
- In the Star Wars animated spin-off series Ewoks, Kneessa's older sister, Asha, was raised by wolf-like creatures called korrinas. After being swiped down a river while escaping a hanadak, she was found by Kneessa and her friend Wicket and returned with them to Bright Tree Village.
- In the She-Ra: Princess of Power 1985 episode "Wild Child," Princess Allegra (voiced by Linda Gary) is the daughter of the Green Island Kingdom's ruler King Arbor (voiced by George DiCenzo) who was presumed missing following a shipwreck at the age of 7. It is later revealed that she was found and adopted by a pack of ghostly white wolves called White Fangs.
- The Pokémon episode "The Kangaskhan Kid" featured a boy named Tommy (voiced by Jimmy Zoppi in the English dub) who is raised by Pokémon called Kangaskhan in a reserve near the Safari Zone.
- A 1999 episode of The Pretender titled" Wild Child" featured a young wild girl named Violet (portrayed by Lindsey Evanson). The wild girl was shown to be barefoot, had waist length hair, and was wearing heavily weathered, earth-toned fabric pieces that are frayed, ripped, and caked in dirt and mud.
- In The Wild Thornberrys, Donnie (voiced by Flea), the youngest in the family, spent most of his early years with orangutans in the rainforest of Borneo. His backstory was revealed in the season 4 special "The Origin of Donnie" where his human parents were killed by two poachers when saving some orangutans. Though the natives held a funeral for the two, Donnie was taken in by a bunch of orangutans living in the nude until he was discovered by the Thornberry family and sporting his trademark leopard-print shorts.
- The 2001 Sheena episode "The Feral King" featured Sheena's encounter with a teenage wild man named Jared Chambers (portrayed by Rick Perkins). When Jared was eight, Jared's cousin Roland (portrayed by Peter Penuel) and his partner Bixby (portrayed by Ron Ely) end up rigging the plane carrying Jared, his father Raymond, and his unnamed mother where it crashed somewhere in the Torags region of Africa with Jared as the only survivor. 10 years later, Jared is sporting a loincloth, a pair of animal hide boots, and shoulder mid-back length hair.
- In the BeastMaster episode "Wild Child", there is a boy named Atticus (portrayed by Lloyd Will) who was raised by a wolf after his father was killed by a fellow tribesman named Milos (portrayed by Anthony Simcoe). When living with the wolf, he sported long mid back-length hair and animal-hide clothing. Atticus has been sought out by his mother Huna (portrayed by Claudia Black) who receives aid from Dar and Tao in getting to him first before Milos does with help from King Zad. Huna and Atticus were able to identify each other due to the same birthmarks they have. This led to a fight between Dar, Tao, and Huna against King Zad and Milo's group where Milos and his followers are killed while King Zad gets away. Afterwards, Atticus goes home with his mother after saying goodbye to the wolf.
- The Monarch from the Cartoon Network Adult Swim show The Venture Bros. claimed to be raised by monarch butterflies in his youth. He wears a monarch butterfly costume with a crown, showing his "royal" status.
- In the 2006 Totally Spies episode "Alex Gets Schooled," the headmaster Charleston (voiced by Adrian Truss) was raised by dolphins at age ten, after he fell from his family's yacht. This would later lead him to a plot to use his Dolphinizer invention to turn his students into dolphin-like creatures in his revenge on the world for polluting the oceans.
- In the animated TV series Growing Up Creepie, Creepella "Creepie" Creecher was raised by insects after she was left at the doorstep of a mansion as a baby.
- In Juken Sentai Gekiranger, a show in Toei Company's Super Sentai franchise, Kandou Jan/GekiRed was, as a young child, the sole survivor when his village was destroyed, and was raised in the nearby forest by tigers and pandas. Growing up in the company of animals has taught him to feel with his body rather than his heart, which is something he must re-learn. One of his notable idiosyncrasies is his personal 'Jan-ish' language, using onomatopoeia in place of many of the words he does not know.
- In Digimon Data Squad (Digimon Savers in Japan), the character Keenan Crier (Ikuto Noguchi in Savers) was brought into the Digital World as an infant and raised by the Digimon Frigimon to believe that he is a Digimon. After Frigimon's death at the hands of one of Akihiro Kurata's Gizumon, Keenan was raised by Merukimon. When brought back to the human world around the age of eleven, he greatly protested being treated as a human and having to act as one, coming off as very wild, and (at least in Savers) spoke in a very stilted manner from his lack of communication with humans.
- In a Season 4 episode of Supernatural, two humans (portrayed by Mandy Playdon and Mark Wynn) are found in a house thought to be haunted. Instead, it is discovered the two children were the product of Bill Gibson (portrayed by Gerry Rousseau) impregnating his daughter Rebecca, mother of the children, who later committed suicide. The children, though never explicitly described as feral, lack the ability to speak, survive off rats, and are extremely violent.
- In Deadman Wonderland, Gazuchi Mōzuri of the Undertakers was a wild man abandoned by his mother and raised by bears. He was sent to Deadman Wonderland for the murder of several hunters and campers at age ten. The one camper he spared was the snake-like Shinagawa Dōkoku who assisted Gazuchi with his killing.
- The ABC series Once Upon a Time gives the Huntsman from Snow White a backstory of being raised by wolves.
- The Filipino fantasy drama series Aryana chronicles the journey of a teenage girl (portrayed by Ella Cruz) who was taken and placed under a curse by a mermaid (portrayed by Desiree del Valle) whose daughter was killed by a dynamite thrown in the water. The mermaid returned Aryana to her human mother (portrayed by Pokwang) as a baby. When Aryana turned 14 years old, she would grow fins and scales and become an adoptive daughter to the mermaid.
- In the Liv and Maddie episode "Howl-A-Rooney," the character Emmy "Fangs" Wulfert (portrayed by Laura Marano) is a teenage "wolf girl" who was raised by wolves ever since she wandered away from her camp when she was little.
- In the Cartoon Network series Adventure Time, Finn the Human, was raised by magical dogs.
- In the Manga/Anime Demon Slayer: Kimetsu no Yaiba, Inosuke Hashibira was raised by wild boars after his mother's death by a demon.
- In the Netflix original series Kipo and the Age of Wonderbeasts, one of the main characters, Wolf, was raised by wolves.
- In the Netflix original series DreamWorks Dragons: Rescue Riders, the twins Dak and Leyla have been raised by dragons.
- In the Netflix series Maya and the Three, Chimi (voiced by Stephanie Beatriz) was raised by jungle animals after being kicked out of The Junglelands.
- The Teenage Euthanasia episode "Mother's Day" revealed that Baba gave birth in the Shame Cave in her old country and fought a losing battle against a bear for it which would explain why Baba goes bear-hunting every Mother's Day while not wanting to lose her children Trophy and Pete. By the end of the episode, the lost daughter (vocal effects provided by Jackie Hoffman) has grown up to be a naked wild woman with long hair with sticks in it and long nails. While staring at the Shame Cave, the wild woman and the bear have a talk with their language translated with subtitles where the bear states that she can return to the human world at any time. The wild woman then states that after how she saw human mothers in action, "Baba did her a favor".

== In games ==
- In the popular fighting game Street Fighter, the character Blanka was raised by animals in the Amazon rainforest. His skin turned green, and he received electrical powers by being exposed to electric eels.
- The story of the 1994 video game Final Fantasy VI includes a character named Gau, a 13-year-old boy who lives wild on a fictional savanna called the Veldt (or Wild West in Japan). Abandoned shortly after birth, Gau raises himself among the fauna of the plain, learning how to fight in the exact style of many different monsters.
- In Legend of Legaia, the character Noa was an orphan who had been raised by the Ra-Seru, Terra (テルマ, Teruma?)-- who, while raising Noa, attached itself to a female wolf. Due to living most of her life alone in Snowdrift Cave with Terra the wolf, Noa is childish and ignorant; the outside world is new to her. She wants to see the world and meet her parents, who call to her in her dreams. She uses claws or tonfa batons to fight, and her Ra-Seru, Terra, is a wind elemental. Later in the game, she discovers that she is the long-lost daughter of the King and Queen of Conkram.
- In the Warhammer 40,000 universe, Lion El Jonson, the Primarch of the Dark Angels Space Marine Legion, was abandoned in the dark jungles of Caliban for much of his early life. He could only roar and scream he had his first human contact during adolescence. He became rather civilized after being found by the Paladins of Caliban, but still possessed a terrible inner rage and many other traits he had acquired while within the jungles.
- Arietta The Wild from the game Tales of the Abyss is born to humans and raised by ligers from childhood before being found and taught human languages.
- In Red Dead Redemption 2, there is a feral man living naked with wolves after being separated from his dad during a hunting trip. When discovering the cave, the wolves will attack Arthur Morgan. If Arthur manages to kill the wolves, the feral man will hide in the cave crying and it will cost Arthur some honor points.
- In Genshin Impact, there is a playable character named Razor who was raised by wolves. He is shown to have trouble speaking. He has lived with the wolves of Wolvendom for as far as he can remember, and considers them to be his family, or lupical. There is another playable character named Chasca, who was raised by a fictional species of bird-like dragons since infancy and was brought back to human civilization as a child. In the present, she still considers the dragons as family.

== Miscellaneous ==
- In Cave Club, the cavegirl Roaralei is revealed to be raised by Smilodons.

== See also ==
- Feral child
- Infant exposure
- Mowgli Syndrome
- Psychogenic dwarfism
