= Mowgli (disambiguation) =

Mowgli is a fictional feral boy in some stories written by Rudyard Kipling.

- Adventures of Mowgli, a Russian animated feature-length story
- All the Mowgli Stories, a collection of short stories about Mowgli
- Mowgli: Legend of the Jungle, a 2018 film version of The Jungle Book
- Mowgli: The New Adventures of the Jungle Book, a television series based on the Kipling stories
- "Mowgli's Brothers", a short story later included as the first chapter of The Jungle Book
  - Mowgli's Brothers (TV special), an animated television special based on the story

Mowgli may also refer to:

- Camp Mowglis, a summer camp in Hebron, New Hampshire
- Mowgli Street Food, a UK chain of Indian restaurants.
- Mowgli syndrome
- SITAR GY-90 Mowgli, a French light aircraft
- The Mowgli's, a rock band
