= Pyrenee =

Pyrenee can refer to:

- Pyrénée, 1998 French comic book
- Pyrenees, mountains in France and Spain
- Great Pyrenees, breed of dog
