= Shasta of the Wolves =

1919 novel by Olaf Baker

- British edition (George C. Harrap & Co., 1921)
- Author: Olaf Baker
- Language: English
- Publisher: Dodd, Mead and Company
- Publication date: 1919

Shasta of the Wolves is a feral child novel by British-born American children's author Olaf Baker. The novel was originally published in 1919 by Dodd, Mead and Company with illustrations by Charles Livingston Bull, and was reprinted a number of times up until 1959.

== Plot summary ==
On a mountain in the Pacific Northwest, apparently in the 19th century, the she-wolf Nitka discovers an abandoned Native American baby and is inspired by the "Spirit of the Wild" to raise him alongside her own cubs. He has no name of his own to begin with, although the author calls him Shasta from the outset.

Like Rudyard Kipling's Mowgli (Baker even refers to him as a man-cub), Shasta grows up naked in the wild and is able to speak to animals, including the wise old black bear Gomposh, although this "speech" seems to consist as much of body language as of actual vocalization. Along the way his animal parents and friends rescue him from attacks by a grizzly bear and a moose, and he takes revenge on an eagle for killing wolf cubs.

Shasta also discovers a human tribe and is briefly captured by them before his wolf parents help him to escape. His curiosity eventually draws him back, and this time he is treated more kindly and persuaded to stay. The chief explains to the tribe that he is in fact one of their own tribesmen, Shasta, grandson of the old chief. Shasta's mother was killed by a tribesman who defected to an enemy tribe, the Assiniboines, taking Shasta and abandoning him in the hope that the wolves would kill him. Instead, he survived and eventually returned to the tribe bringing his "wolf medicine".

While Shasta is in the process of learning tribal ways, he discovers that the Assiniboines are once more planning to attack. During the raid Shasta is captured and prepared for sacrifice, but is once again rescued by his wolf-friends, who avenge his human mother's death by killing many of the enemy tribe.

After the battle Shasta stays with his wolf kindred, and the author is deliberately ambiguous as to whether he later returns to human society.

== See also ==
- Animal communication
- List of fictional feral children
