= Camp Mowglis =

Boys summer camp in New Hampshire, US

- Location within New Hampshire
- Location: East Hebron, New Hampshire
- Coordinates: 43°41′46″N 71°46′15″W
- Operated by: Holt Elwell Memorial Foundation
- Established: 1903
- Website: www.mowglis.org
- Camp Mowglis
- U.S. National Register of Historic Places
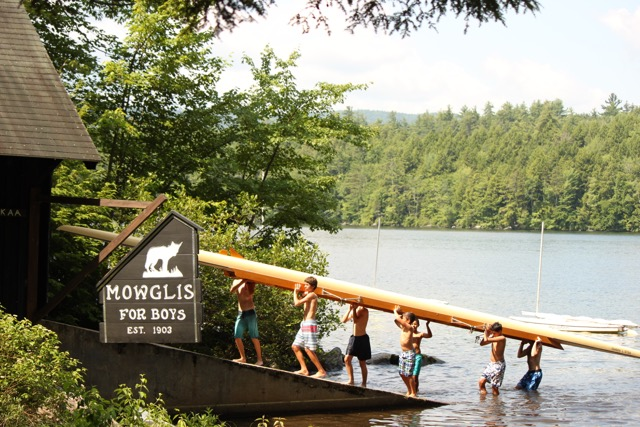
- Mowglis campers loading crew boat
- NRHP reference No.: 100004085
- Added to NRHP: June 20, 2019

Camp Mowglis is a nonprofit residential camp for boys. Founded in 1903, it is one of the oldest summer camps in the United States. It is located in Hebron, New Hampshire, on the shores of Newfound Lake. It's owned by the nonprofit Holt Elwell Memorial Foundation. Mowglis was founded by Elizabeth Ford Holt and the camp includes some themes from Rudyard Kipling's The Jungle Book. The camp was listed on the National Register of Historic Places in 2019.

The symbol of the camp is a wolf cub. The Mowglis Mountain and its Mowglis Trail in New Hampshire get their name from the camp. Many of the surrounding trails were maintained by the camp's boys.

== History ==
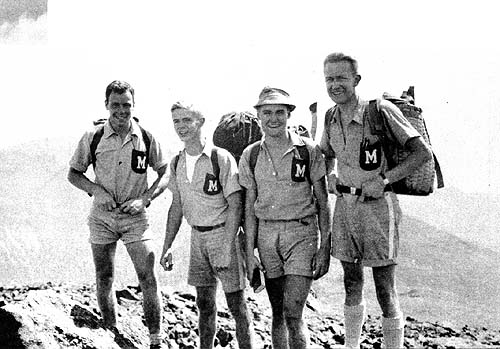
1940 atop Mount Jefferson

At the turn of the 20th century, Elizabeth Ford Holt, a reformer from Cambridge, Massachusetts, became interested in establishing summer camps to encourage character development in children. In 1900, she started a short-lived camp for girls, Redcroft, which historian Barksdale Maynard called "the first girls camp of significance." Three years later, Holt purchased the Barnard Farm on the shores of Newfound Lake and founded Camp Mowglis, a "School of the Open". Holt contacted Rudyard Kipling while living at Naulakha in nearby Dummerston, Vermont, and received his permission to borrow names and themes from The Jungle Book.

Rudyard Kipling and his wife Carrie held a lifelong fascination with Camp Mowglis, a summer camp that continues to uphold traditions inspired by Kipling. The camp's wooden structures bear names such as Akela, Toomai, Baloo, and Panther, evoking the imagery from Kipling's stories found in The Jungle Book. The campers, ranging from the youngest "Cubs" to the oldest residing in the "Den," are collectively referred to as "the Pack."

Col. Alcott Farar Elwell, who contributed to the development of many trails in the Mount Carrigan region, was the camp director for more than 50 years.

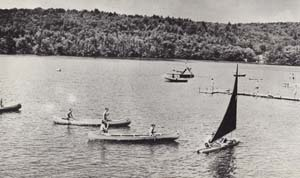
1956 Camp Mowglis waterfront

In 2012, Camp Director Sam Punderson retired, and the foundation hired Nick Robbins as the new director. A graduate of Colorado College, Robbins has been a year-round camp director for the camp since 2013. Robbins is active with the American Camp Association and certified Outdoor Emergency Care Provider with the National Ski Patrol.

== Notable alumni ==
- Frank Mauran (1925–2022), President of the Providence Steamboat Company (1967–1982)
- Daniel Dennett, (1945-2024), philosopher
- David Concannon, deep-sea explorer
- Charlie Walbridge (b. 1948), whitewater paddler and author
- Senator John Heinz III (1938-1991), U.S. senator from Pennsylvania
- Chris Hedges (b. 1956), American journalist, author, commentator, and minister

== See also ==
- Chocorua Island Chapel

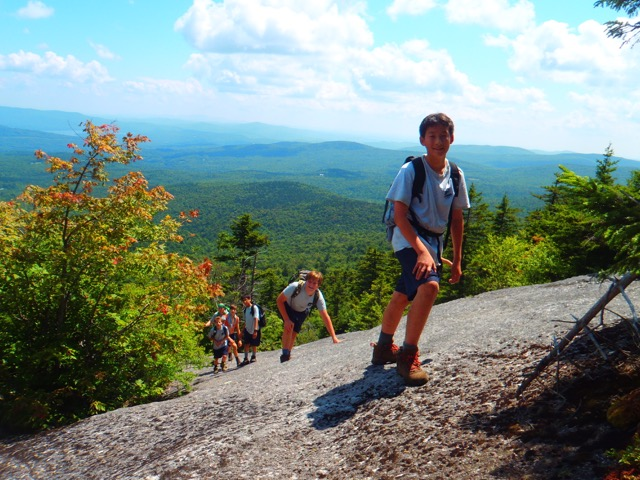
Mowglis
