= The Dragon of Despair =

2004 book by Jane Lindskold

- Author: Jane Lindskold
- Language: English
- Series: Firekeeper Saga
- Genre: Fantasy
- Publisher: Tor Fantasy
- Publication date: 2003
- Publication place: United States
- Media type: Print (hardback & paperback)
- ISBN: 0-7653-0259-4
- Preceded by: Wolf's Head, Wolf's Heart
- Followed by: Wolf Captured

The Dragon of Despair is a 2003 fantasy novel by Jane Lindskold. The book is the third in the Firekeeper Saga, happening about a year after Wolf's Head, Wolf's Heart.

== Synopsis ==
The novel continues the story of Firekeeper, who must deal with the continued machinations of Melina Shield. Continuing to desire power and strong magic, Melina has brainwashed a powerful leader into marrying her. It's up to Firekeeper to stop Melina and hopefully bring peace.

== Release ==
The Dragon of Despair was first published in hardback and ebook formats in 2003 by Tor Fantasy. A paperback edition followed the next year, also through Tor.

== Reception ==
Don D'Ammassa, who reviewed for the Chronicle: SF, Fantasy & Horror's Monthly Trade Journal, considered The Dragon of Despair to be an improvement on the two previous books in the series, "despite its familiar plot". Jackie Cassada, for the Library Journal, considered the book to be an enjoyable closure to the first three books of the series, praising "[t]he author's ability to create complex tales involving believable human and animal characters". Barbara Riley of The Santa Fe New Mexican also wrote a favorable review and a reviewer for the Albuquerque Journal noted that Lindskold had done "a hefty amount of study on wolf behavior".

Kirkus Reviews criticized Lindskold's book, saying the "distracting subplots, tedious dialogue, and multiple points of view stalls a story that starts too slowly and never gains momentum." Publishers Weekly, on the other hand, praised the story, especially for Lindskold's use of "lore about pack behavior and feral animals."
