= Hebron, New Hampshire =

- Town
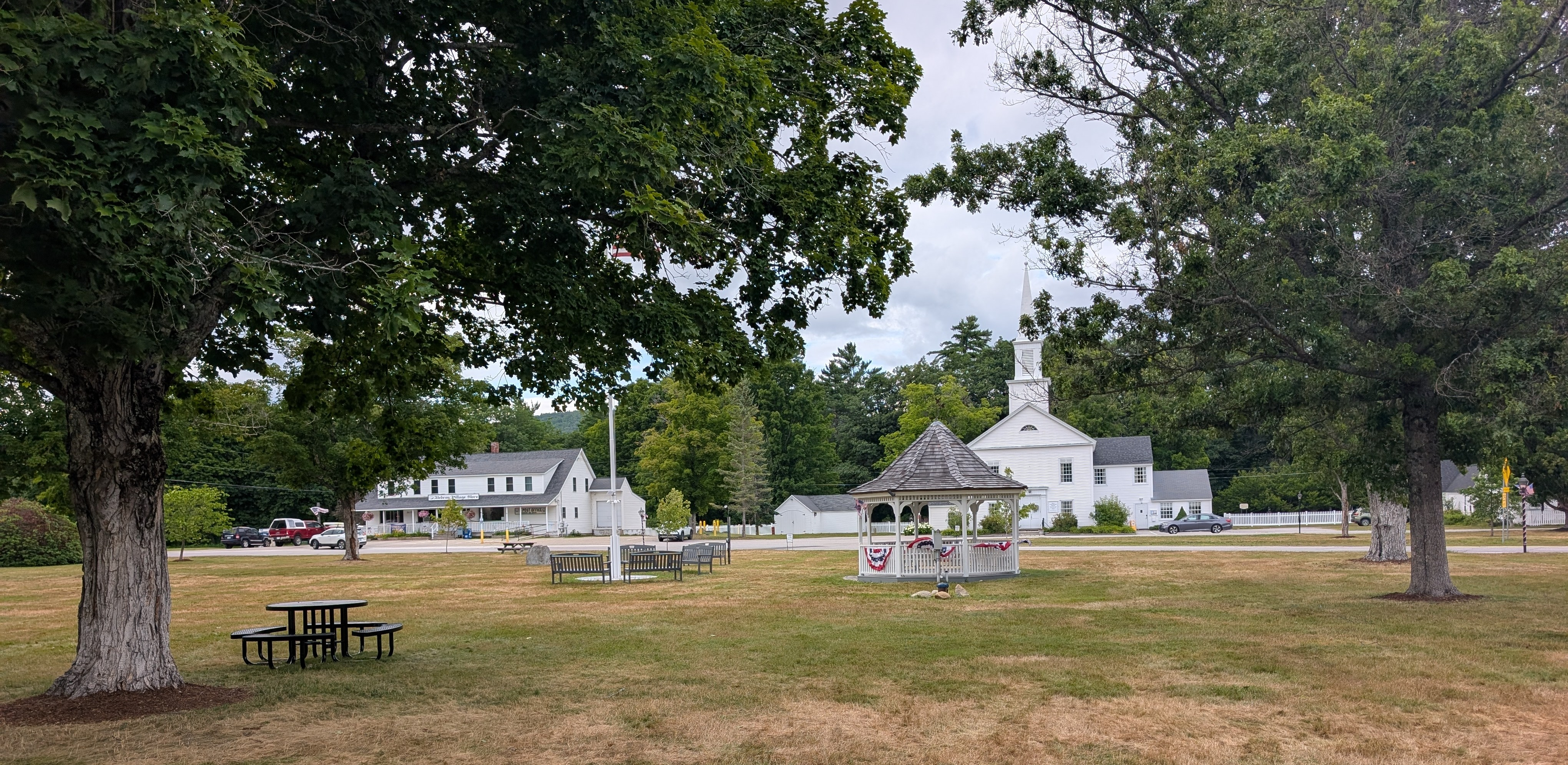
- Town Common

- Seal

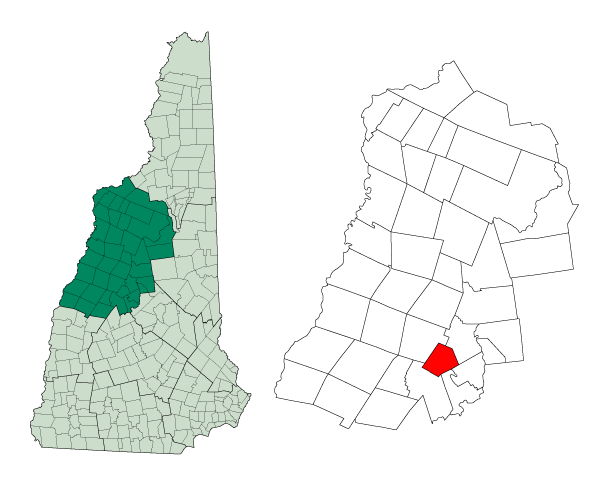
- Location in Grafton County, New Hampshire
- Coordinates: 43°41′41″N 71°47′31″W
- Country: United States
- State: New Hampshire
- County: Grafton
- Incorporated: 1792
- Villages: Hebron; East Hebron

Area
  - Total: 19.26 sq mi (49.88 km^{2})
  - Land: 17.01 sq mi (44.05 km^{2})
  - Water: 2.25 sq mi (5.84 km^{2}) 11.70%
- Elevation: 597 ft (182 m)

Population (2020)
  - Total: 632
  - Density: 37/sq mi (14.3/km^{2})
- Time zone: UTC-5
  - Summer (DST): UTC-4 (Eastern)
- ZIP code: 03241
- Area code: 603
- FIPS code: 33-35220
- GNIS feature ID: 873622
- Website: www.hebronnh.gov

Hebron is a town in Grafton County, New Hampshire, United States, having a population of 632 as of the 2020 census. Settlements include the town center and the village of East Hebron.

== History ==
First settled in 1765, Hebron was incorporated in 1792 from a portion of the extinct township of Cockermouth (now Groton), combined with a portion of what was then called West Plymouth. Most early settlers arrived from New England towns, with no known first-generation emigrants from Europe. The surface was rough, the soil rather stubborn; nevertheless, farming was the primary occupation. Other industries developed after the Mayhew Turnpike was built in 1803, connecting northern towns and lumber harvesting with southern cities and mills. In 1859 the population was 565, when Hebron contained one store and a tannery. By the 1920s, tourism developed into a major occupation, including summer lodges and winter skiing.

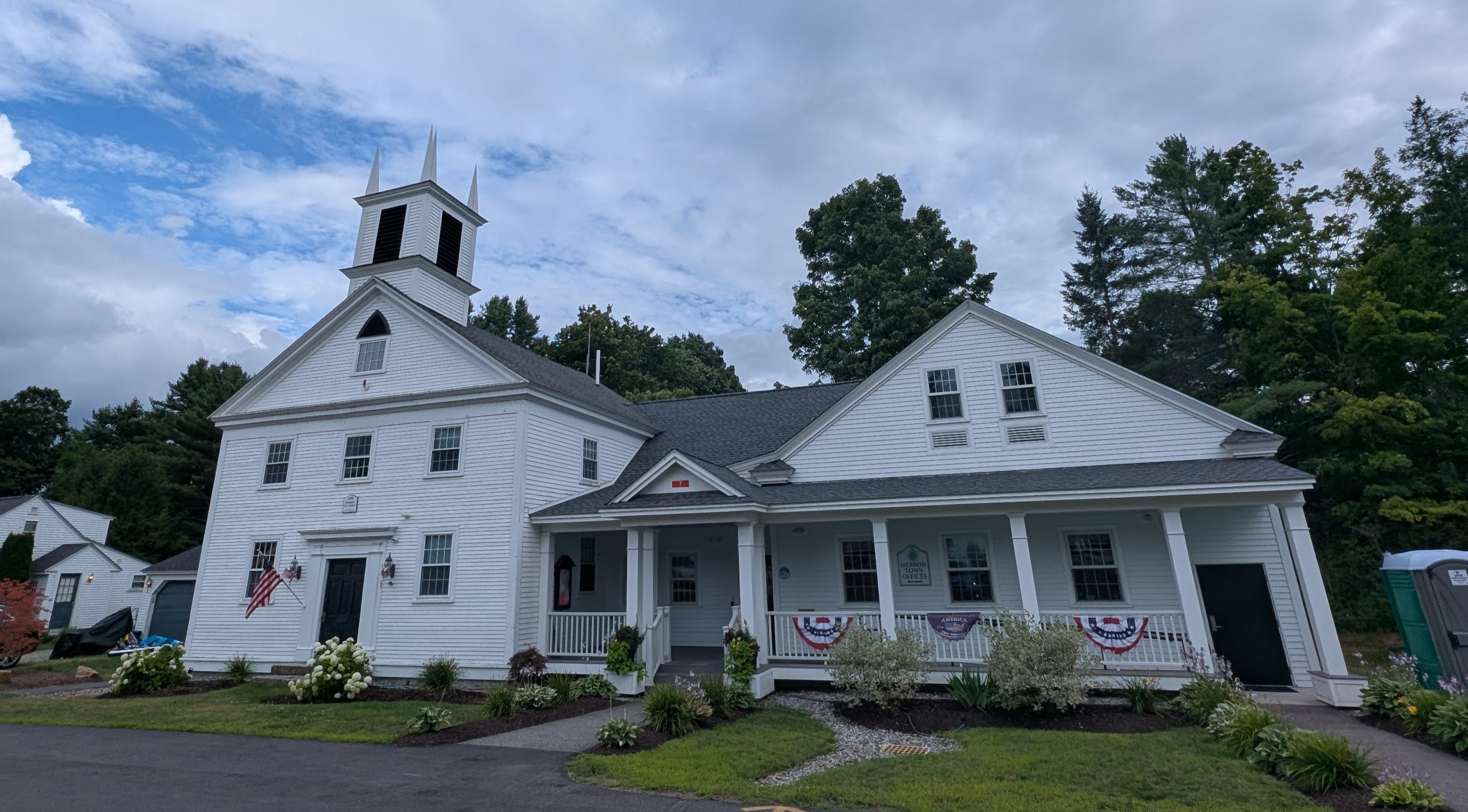
Town hall

== Geography ==
Hebron sits at the north end of Newfound Lake, the fourth-largest lake in New Hampshire. The Cockermouth River, the primary feeder to the lake, enters the town from Groton to the west and passes the town center before entering the lake. Hebron lies fully within the Merrimack River watershed. The highest point in Hebron is a knob with an elevation of 2,240 feet (680 m) above sea level just south of the summit of Tenney Mountain, near the town's northernmost point.

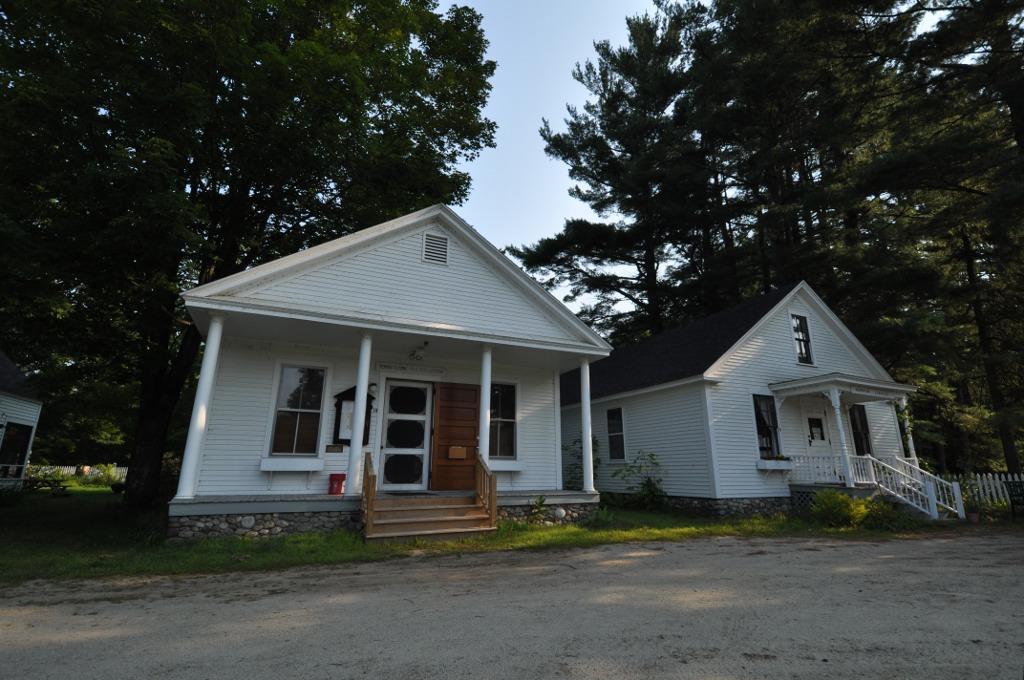
Town library

The town center, Hebron village, is located near the northwestern corner of Newfound Lake, at the intersection of North Shore Road, West Shore Road, and Groton Road. New Hampshire Route 3A passes through the eastern part of town, following the east shore of Newfound Lake. The village of East Hebron is located near the northeastern end of the lake, close to the intersection of Route 3A with North Shore Road.

According to the United States Census Bureau, the town has a total area of 19.3 square miles (49.9 km^{2}), of which 17.0 square miles (44.0 km^{2}) are land and 2.2 square miles (5.8 km^{2}) are water, comprising 11.70% of the town.

== Demographics ==
Historical population
Census	Pop.	Note	%±
1800	281		—
1810	563		100.4%
1820	572		1.6%
1830	538		−5.9%
1840	508		−5.6%
1850	565		11.2%
1860	475		−15.9%
1870	382		−19.6%
1880	329		−13.9%
1890	245		−25.5%
1900	214		−12.7%
1910	213		−0.5%
1920	184		−13.6%
1930	197		7.1%
1940	151		−23.4%
1950	130		−13.9%
1960	153		17.7%
1970	234		52.9%
1980	349		49.1%
1990	386		10.6%
2000	459		18.9%
2010	602		31.2%
2020	632		5.0%
U.S. Decennial Census

As of the census of 2000, there were 459 people, 206 households, and 146 families residing in the town. The population density was 27.3 inhabitants per square mile (10.5/km^{2}). There were 517 housing units at an average density of 30.7 per square mile (11.9/km^{2}). The racial makeup of the town was 95.86% White, 0.44% African American, 0.22% Native American, 0.22% Asian, 1.74% from other races, and 1.53% from two or more races.

There were 206 households, out of which 20.4% had children under the age of 18 living with them, 63.1% were married couples living together, 5.8% had a female householder with no husband present, and 29.1% were non-families. 23.3% of all households were made up of individuals, and 10.2% had someone living alone who was 65 years of age or older. The average household size was 2.23 and the average family size was 2.60.

In the town, the population was spread out, with 16.1% under the age of 18, 6.3% from 18 to 24, 18.7% from 25 to 44, 30.7% from 45 to 64, and 28.1% who were 65 years of age or older. The median age was 50 years. For every 100 females, there were 97.0 males. For every 100 females age 18 and over, there were 91.5 males.

The median income for a household in the town was $47,639, and the median income for a family was $54,688. Males had a median income of $37,857 versus $30,625 for females. The per capita income for the town was $30,196. About 2.6% of families and 2.8% of the population were below the poverty line, including 6.8% of those under age 18 and 2.3% of those age 65 or over.

== Education ==
The town is within the Newfound Area School District. Bridgewater-Hebron Village School is in Bridgewater. The district's secondary schools are Newfound Memorial Middle School, and Newfound Regional High School in Bristol.

== Notable people ==
- John Ball (1794–1884), teacher, attorney, politician
- Nathaniel S. Berry (1796–1894), governor of New Hampshire during the Civil War
- John Ordway (1775–1817), sergeant in the Corps of Discovery, helped lead the Lewis and Clark Expedition
- Austin F. Pike (1819–1886), congressman, senator

== See also ==
- Hebron Village Historic District
