= John Ball (pioneer) =

American politician

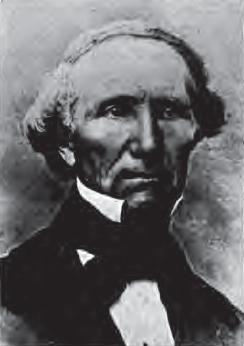
- Born: November 12, 1794; Hebron, Grafton County, New Hampshire
- Died: February 5, 1884 (aged 89); Grand Rapids, Michigan
- Resting place: Fulton Street Cemetery, Grand Rapids, Michigan; 42°57'49.9896", -085°38'52.8216"
- Education: Dartmouth College
- Occupations: Teacher; Attorney; Politician
- Spouse: Mary Thompson (Webster) Ball
- Children: Frank Webster Ball, Kate Webster (Ball) Powers, Flora (Ball) Hopkins, Lucy Ball, Mary Johanna, John Helvetia Ball
- Parent(s): Nathaniel and Sarah (Nevins) Ball

John Ball (November 12, 1794 – February 5, 1884) was a settler, educator, lawyer and member of the Michigan State Legislature.

== Early life ==
Ball was born at Tenny Hill, Hebron, Grafton County, New Hampshire. He had a common school education that he got from short times at winter with a local clergyman when his father would let him leave his tough labors at the farm. He graduated from Dartmouth College in 1820, having started there as a student when he was 21. He studied law two years at Lansingburgh, New York and then went to Darien, Georgia where he was shipwrecked and taught school for the winter of 1822–23 to earn his passage back to New York. He was admitted to the bar in 1824.

Ball's sister Deborah married William Powers who set up an oil cloth factory in New York. When William Powers died Deborah continued to run the factory and hired Ball as foreman who at that point left his law practice.

== Oregon ==
As a member of Nathaniel Jarvis Wyeth's first expedition, in 1832 he traveled to the Oregon Country. While overwintering at Fort Vancouver from 1832 to 1833, he was employed by John McLoughlin to teach the children of the fort. The Chief Factor told the New Englander that "you will have the reputation of teaching the first school in Oregon", making him the first white teacher of Oregon. In the spring of 1833 McLoughlin tried to convince the American to continue running the school, but Ball desired to begin practicing agriculture.

McLoughlin gave Ball farming equipment, potatoes, corn, 25 bushels of wheat. Ball and a friend departed in March to the Salem, Oregon area and temporarily resided with retired HBC employee Jean Baptiste Depatie McKay. With help from his white neighbors and a "wild Indian" he planted, raised and harvested a wheat crop. This made him the first American to farm on the French Prairie, several French-Canadians having already begun farming operations some years prior. By September he described being tired of living a "primitive life" and interacting with the Kalapuya people. To afford passage back to the United States of America, Ball sold his wheat crop to McLoughlin to travel aboard a HBC vessel, the Dryad. He returned via the Hawaiian Islands and Cape Horn in 1833–34.

== Later life ==
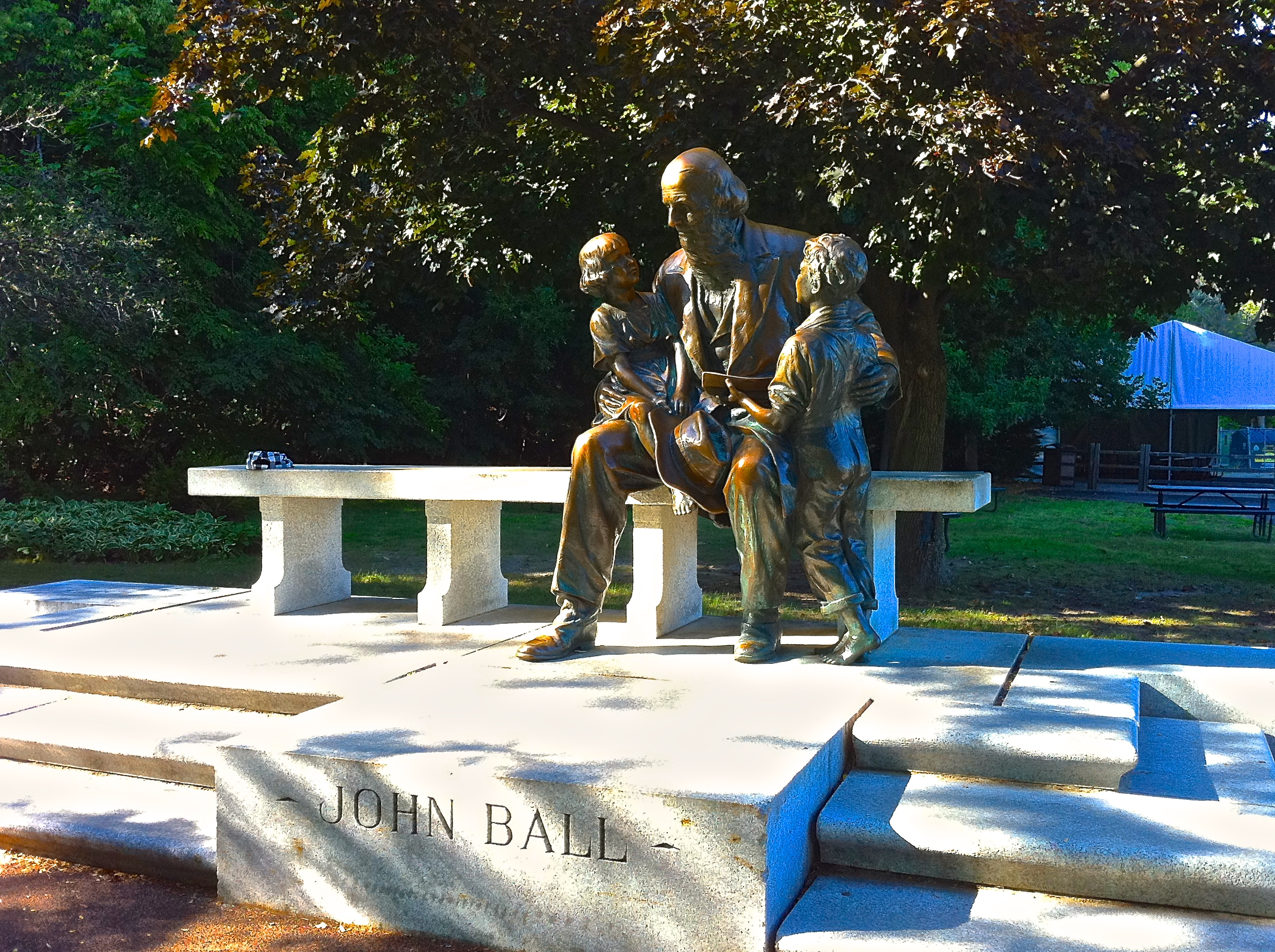
Statue of John Ball in Grand Rapids.

Despite returning to his hometown of Lansingburgh, Ball settled at Grand Rapids, Michigan in 1837. He opened a law office and partnered with, among others, the George Martin, formerly Chief Justice of Michigan and Solomon Lewis Withey, late United States District Judge. Ball represented eastern capitalists in locating lands during the "wildcat banking" era.

In 1842 he was appointed by Governor John Barry to select 300,000 acres (1,200 km^{2}) of the 500,000 acres (2,000 km^{2}) of land granted to Michigan by Congress for internal improvements. These were mainly selected about Grand Rapids and were mostly taken up with internal improvement warrants, and as these warrants could be bought for about forty cents on the dollar, it resulted in a speedy settlement of the Grand River Valley. Ball was a strong promoter of Grand Rapids. He was interested in schools, geology, lyceums and all local enterprises; he provided the first written account of the geology of Oregon. Ball was a key figure in creating Michigan's public school system.

In politics he was a conservative Democrat and served in the Michigan State Legislature.

He donated the land in Grand Rapids, Michigan that is now John Ball Park and John Ball Zoo.
