= Chuang Tse and the First Emperor =

Book by Anna Russo

- 2012 edition
- Author: Anna Russo
- Original title: Chuang Tse e il primo imperatore
- Language: Italian
- Genre: Philosophical novel Spiritual
- Publisher: Alacran
- Publication date: 2010
- Publication place: Italy
- Media type: Print
- Pages: 93 pages
- ISBN: 978-88-6361-024-6

Chuang Tse and the First Emperor (Chuang Tse e il Primo Imperatore) is a novel by Italian writer Anna Russo. Published in 2010, the story questions the reader's view of reality.

== Plot ==
The story begins 2,222 years ago.

Contravening any historical fact, Zhen Li, King of Qin, having unified the six states in which the kingdom was divided into, undertook the title of Qin Shi Huang, or rather the first august emperor, reviving with him the very beginning of time. To delete any historical fact that would have illegitimated his power and following his trusted Minister Shi Lu's recommendations, had ordered that any text so far written be destroyed and to obtain the largest possible number of hard labor prisoners for the construction of the Great Wall, the terracotta army, and his three hundred and sixty-five room palace, extended sentences which would have punished not only the responsible but its entire family, as well. It was because of a book and the extension of the penalties that Chuang Tse's family was deported. Chuang Tse was saved thanks to his foresighted mother who had not registered him at birth, making him unknown to the civil service. Eleven years had past from that day. Chuang Tse had grown up as did his longing for revenge.

In the meantime, the first emperor had attained an immeasurable power and proved to be a cruel and despotic tyrant. He had thousands of enemies which he had to watch from and despite all the propitiatory rites, the stars had predicted for him a terrible defeat and a reign of only eleven years. Yet the emperor was not aware that the time of that most terrible enemy had arrived.
