= Wolf Hunting =

2006 novel by Jane Lindskold

- Author: Jane Lindskold
- Language: English
- Series: Firekeeper Saga
- Genre: Fantasy
- Publisher: Tor Fantasy
- Publication date: 2006
- Publication place: United States
- Media type: Print (hardback & paperback)
- Preceded by: Wolf Captured
- Followed by: Wolf's Blood

Wolf Hunting is the fifth novel in the Firekeeper Saga series by Jane Lindskold.

== Reception ==
The Santa Fe New Mexican praised the novel's characters and Lindskold's writing.
