= Anna Russo =

Italian writer

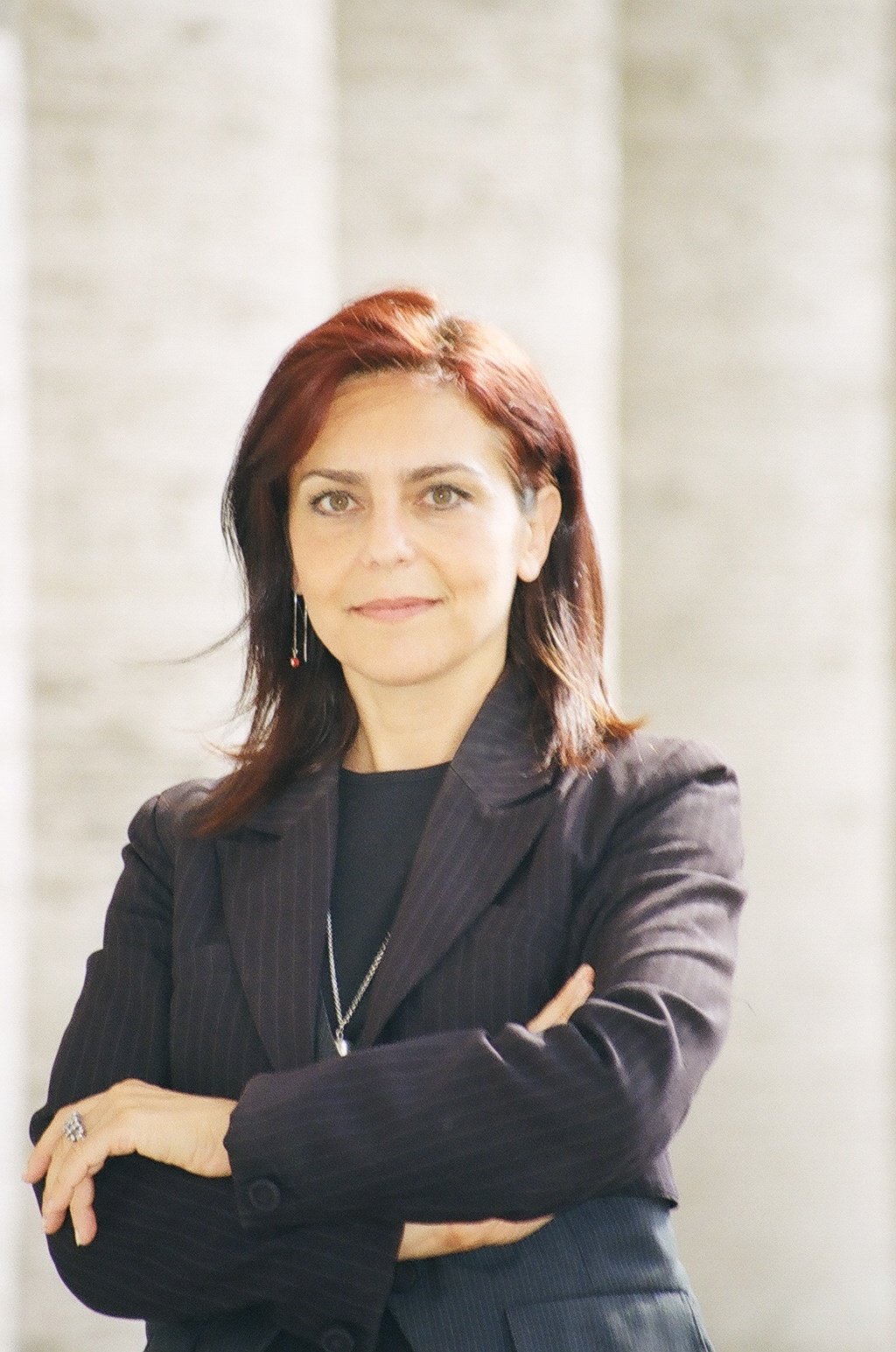
Anna Russo

Anna Russo is an Italian writer. She was born in Naples, and her debut as a writer partly came about after she received a major literary prize for travel writing: The Next Generation. As a result of the grant, she lived for twelve years in southern France, where she became close to the gypsies, particularly two of the "grand" families of Reyes and Baliardo. From this research and collaboration, she wrote two important books, Gitani si nasce e si diventa (We Are Born and We Become Gypsies) and El Cante Flamenco (The Flamenco Song), which received support from the Spanish Consulate in Italy and the Cervantes Cultural Institute.

Her meeting with the publisher Salani generated another book, La bambina Babilonia (The Girl Babilonia), which received great success and was awarded numerous prizes. Following this success, she signed with Einaudi Ragazzi, one of the most respected publishers in Italy.

In 2006 she published Pao alla conquista del mondo (Pao Conquers the World), and in 2007, Caro Hamid, fratello lontano (Dear Hamid, Distant Brother). They represent a decisive turn in the poetics and direction of this author.

In 2008 she published Ibrahim, il bambino del campo (Ibrahim, a Boy in the Field / The Secret Story of Ibrahim). In 2009 she published Il baffo del dittatore (The Dictator's Moustaches) with Mursia editore. In 2010, Caro Hamid, fratello lontano (Dear Hamid, Distant Brother) won the Stefany Gay-Taché Award. In 2010 she published Chuang Tse e il primo imperatore (Chuang Tse and the First Emperor) with Alacran editore.

She lives in Rome.

== Works ==
- Gitani si nasce e si diventa Stampa alternativa 2003
- El cante flamenco Stampa Alternativa 2004
- La bambina Babilonia Salani 2005
- Pao alla conquista del mondo Einaudi r. 2006
- Caro Hamid, fratello lontano Einaudi r. 2007
- Ibrahim, a Boy in the Field Fatatrac 2008
- Il baffo del dittatore Mursia 2009
- The Dictator's Moustaches Mursia 2009
- Chuang Tse e il primo imperatore Alacran 2010
- Chuang Tse and the First Emperor Alacran 2010
- Seven Billion Smashwords 2011
- Pao Conquers the World A new life 2012
- The Secret Story of Ibrahim A new life 2013
- Barattolo A new life 2014
- Alfabeto Mágico A new life 2015
