= Donnerjack =

1997 novel by Roger Zelazny and Jane Lindskold

- Cover illustration from the first edition
- Author: Roger Zelazny and Jane Lindskold
- Cover artist: Amy Halperin
- Language: English
- Genre: Science fiction novel
- Publisher: Avon
- Publication date: August 1997
- Publication place: United States
- Media type: Print (Hardback)
- Pages: 503
- ISBN: 0-380-97326-X
- OCLC: 35849167
- Dewey Decimal: 813/.54 21
- LC Class: PS3576.E43 D66 1997

Donnerjack is a science fiction novel begun by American author Roger Zelazny and completed after his death by his companion Jane Lindskold. It was published in 1997.

The original title of the book was Donnerjack, of Virtú. Initially, Zelazny intended it to begin an ambitious trilogy, with the two sequels tentatively titled The Gods of Virtú and Virtú, Virtú. Zelazny completed a few hundred pages of the first novel and left detailed notes for the remainder, which Lindskold completed, attempting to emulate his writing style. The novel's description of the virtual world of Virtú has been seen as prefiguring the Internet.

== Plot ==
Donnerjack is set in a world that has developed a shared, fully immersive virtual reality. This virtual reality, referred to as Virtu, has come to dominate all aspects of society. People work, play, and can lead entire lives in Virtu.

The eponymous John Donnerjack is one of the creators of Virtu, and a peerless engineer, capable of building just about anything in his virtual reality. The story follows John's final adventure, where he saves his lover from Death itself, and continues on through the perspective of his son, Jack. Many aspects of Donnerjack directly parallel famous myths and legends, particularly those conforming to Joseph Campbell's theory of the monomyth.

It is heavily implied throughout the novel that, though humanity experiences it as a virtual reality simulation, Virtu may actually be an unintentional bridge to the magical realms described in mythology.

It is not connected with Jack of Shadows written by Zelazny years before.

== Critical response ==
Kirkus Reviews magazine found the novel overly complicated and in need of editing, but full of ideas.

SF Site magazine gave the novel a positive review. In contrast, SF Reviews website rated it 0/5—"awful".
