= The Buried Pyramid =

2004 novel by Jane Lindskold

- Author: Jane Lindskold
- Publisher: Tor Books
- Publication date: 2004
- ISBN: 978-0-7653-0260-1

The Buried Pyramid is a novel written in 2004 by Jane Lindskold and published by Tor Books.

== Plot ==
A British soldier named Captain Neville Hawthorne is ordered by his commanding officer, Colonel Reginald Sedgewick to escort Prince Albert's cousin, Alphonse "Herr" Libermann, a German archaeologist. Which Alphone tells Neville that he's searching for the Buried Pyramid, the Tomb of Neferankhotep, who may also have been Moses the Lawgiver and that a lady gave him the journal of an explorer named Chad Spice.

A soldier named Sergeant Edward "Eddie" Bryce joins them on their search for the Buried Pyramid along with Alphonse's assistant, Derek, and three camel wranglers named Ali, his son, Ishmael, and his daughter, Miriam.

Eddie hears something that sounds more like a wolf pack than jackals. Neville orders the group to get the camels ready and get out of the canyon because it's like a box. Miriam leads them to a place that is a necropolis to the old kings and a place her father and brother don't trust. Alphonse is clipped by a ricochet from a bullet fired from a Bedouin's rifle. The Bedouins made an occasional charge but were driven back without much effort. Occasionally they dragged a wounded comrade. On the third day, Neville comes up with a plan' to escape. He has Miriam and Alphonse dress him as a mummy. Miriam runs to the Bedouins and tells them that they woke up the mummy. When Neville points at a person Eddie shoots them. The Bedouins run off. After they return to Cairo, Alphonse returns to Germany while Neville returns to England and Eddie becomes a native.

Ten years later, Jenny Benet, a recently orphaned American girl who lived on the Wild West has been sent to live with her Uncle Neville after her parents were killed by Indians while she was being educated at a Boston finishing school. Neville is a retired British soldier, who is now an archaeologist is traveling to Egypt along with his friend, Stephen Holmboe, Edward "Eddie" Bryce, and his servants, Emily and Bert. Neville tells Jenny and Stephen why they are going to Egypt. He tells them what happened to him in the last ten years. Then they get a threatening letter written in hieroglyphs from a person who goes by the name "The Sphinx". They translate it with the help of Stephen.

They get on Neptune's Charger, the boat that will take them to Egypt. There they meet Lady Audrey Cheshire, Audrey's servant, Mrs.Syms, Captain Robert Brentworth, his servant, Rashid, and the Travers Family. Mrs.Travers lose her jewel box and asks Stephen to find it for her. He agrees to find it with some help from Neville and Jenny. He finds it in between the bed and the wall. He returns it to Mrs.Travers. Then they get a letter from The Sphinx.

The boat lands in Cairo and the passengers gets ride from the Travers Family on a military train heading to a military base. Audrey and her group stays at Sheppard's while Neville and his group stay at Papa Antonio's hotel. He turns out to be an old friend of Neville. Neville gets a letter from The Sphinx.

Neville and Jenny are attacked by men wearing Anubis masks. The attackers escape. Stephen is surprised when Papa Antionio tells him that the men tried to enter his room but stopped when they saw light in his room. Papa Antonio orders his workers to repair the windows and has Neville and Jenny switch rooms with two of his workers. He also has some of his workers sit on the roof to make sure the attackers don't come back again. Neville finds a letter one of the attackers dropped. It's from The Sphinx.
