= Hebron Village Historic District =

Historic district in New Hampshire, United States

- U.S. National Register of Historic Places
- U.S. Historic district
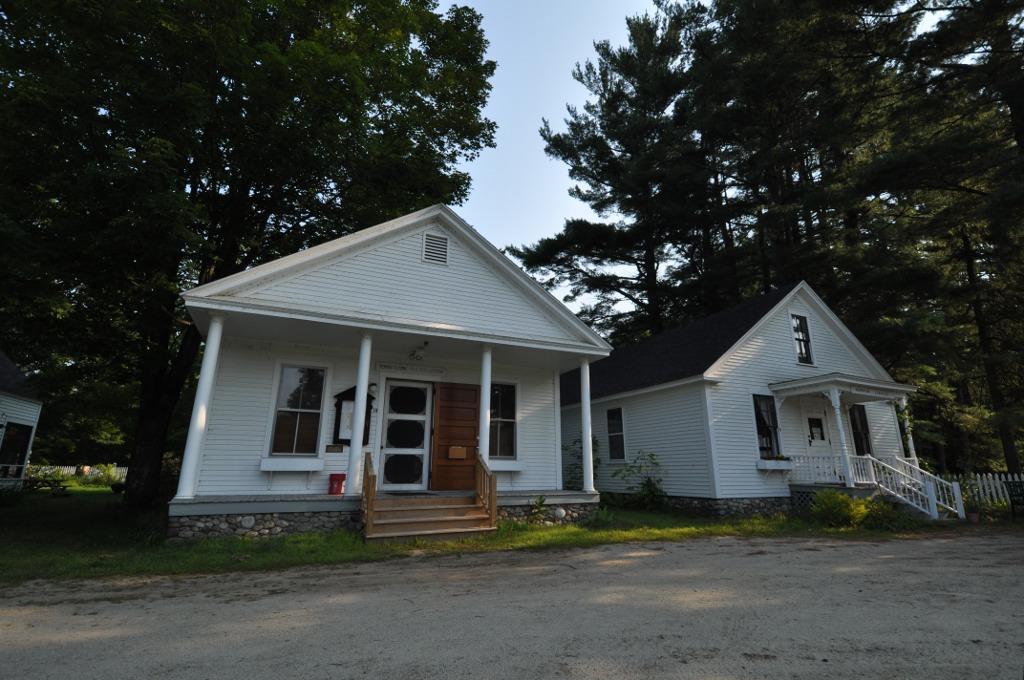

- Location within New Hampshire Location within the United States
- Location: Roughly bounded by Hebron Village Cemetery, N. and W. Shore Rds., Hobart Hill and Groton Rds., Hebron, New Hampshire
- Coordinates: 43°41′38″N 71°48′21″W
- Area: 24.8 acres (10.0 ha)
- Built by: MacDougall, Gordon; Et al.
- NRHP reference No.: 85000492
- Added to NRHP: March 7, 1985

The Hebron Village Historic District encompasses the heart of the small town of Hebron, New Hampshire. The district was listed on the National Register of Historic Places in 1985. Multiple buildings of the district were added to the New Hampshire State Register of Historic Places in 2016.

== Description and history ==
The district consists of the town common, located near the northwest tip of Newfound Lake, the local cemetery, and the buildings immediately adjacent. Four of the thirteen major buildings are public facilities, while eight are residences and one is a store. Two of the public buildings have been repurposed: the town hall is located in a building that was a chapel in 1909, and the public library is located in a building that was built as a grange hall in 1915. Most of the residential structures were built in the first half of the 19th century.

The town of Hebron was incorporated in 1792 out of portions of neighboring towns. Its first public land was the village cemetery, which was laid out soon after incorporation. The town common was acquired by the town in 1799 from Evan Bartlett and Deacon Hobart. It was located for its proximity to what were then natural transportation routes, on the banks of Newfound Lake and the Cockermouth River, which empties into the lake a short way east of the village. In the 19th century, the village flourished economically, in part due to the founding of small-scale water-powered industries on a nearby stream. The common remained largely as originally configured, with the only major alteration the donation of a portion for the establishment of Hebron Academy in 1839.

Seven district buildings were added to the New Hampshire State Register of Historic Places in 2012: Elliot House (6 Hobart Hill Road), Hebron Academy (7 School Street), Meadow Wind (41 North Shore Road), Memorial Chapel & Grange Hall (8 Church Lane), Noyes House (2 Church Lane), The Parsonage (34 North Shore Road), and Powers House & E. Adams Study (14 Church Lane).

== See also ==
- National Register of Historic Places listings in Grafton County, New Hampshire
