= Lord Demon =

Book written by Roger Zelazny and concluded by Jane Lindskold

- Dust-jacket illustration from the first edition
- Author: Roger Zelazny and Jane Lindskold
- Cover artist: Amy Halperin
- Language: English
- Genre: Fantasy
- Publisher: Avon
- Publication date: August 1999
- Publication place: United States
- Media type: Print (Hardback)
- Pages: 276 pp
- ISBN: 0-380-97333-2
- OCLC: 41017382
- Dewey Decimal: 813/.54 21
- LC Class: PS3576.E43 L66 1999

Lord Demon is a fantasy novel by American writer Roger Zelazny, completed in 1999 by Jane Lindskold after his death.

The novel is a "scientific" fantasy built on some of Zelazny's favorite themes—the necessity of knowing oneself, taking risks, and accepting the vulnerability that comes with feeling passionately—and drawing on East Asian, Irish, and hero's quest myths. The novel features his signature protagonist: a smart-mouthed cigarette-smoking intellectual who can be poetic but is detached, and who is homicidal when angered, but more often immersed in art, poetry, and the occasional creation of alternate realities. In addition, the protagonist is kind to the weak and deeply romantic in his approach to women.

== Reception ==
Charles de Lint praised Lord Demon, saying that Lindskold had done "an exemplary job ... of capturing and retaining that wonderful gift Zelazny had of headlong invention, mythic characters made human, and deft, deliciously-convoluted plotting." He characterized the novel as "a worthy farewell to one of the best writers this field has produced."
