= Firekeeper Saga =

Novel series by Jane Lindskold

- Cover for Wolf's Blood, sixth book in the series
- Through Wolf's Eyes; Wolf's Head, Wolf's Heart; The Dragon of Despair; Wolf Captured; Wolf Hunting; Wolf's Blood; Wolf's Search; Wolf's Soul
- Author: Jane Lindskold
- Country: United States
- Language: English
- Genre: Fantasy
- Media type: Print, ebook
- No. of books: 8

The Firekeeper Saga is a series of books written by Jane Lindskold. The series was launched in 2001 with the novel Through Wolf's Eyes and as of 2020, is currently made up of eight novels.

== Premise ==
The series follows Firekeeper, a woman who was raised by highly intelligent and magically enhanced wolves. Her mother tasked the pack with not only her upkeep, but also returning Firekeeper to human society as she is an heir to the throne of Hawk Haven. Human society isn't entirely kind to the young woman, as she is seen as an oddity by some and a freak by others. As the series progresses Firekeeper is drawn ever more into human politics and must contend with the maniacal Melina Shield, who desires power above all else. (This is the very broad premise of just the 1st three books.)

== Books ==
1. Through Wolf's Eyes (2001)
2. Wolf's Head, Wolf's Heart (2002)
3. The Dragon of Despair (2003)
4. Wolf Captured (2004)
5. Wolf Hunting (2006)
6. Wolf's Blood (2007)
7. Wolf's Search (2019)
8. Wolf's Soul (2020)

== Publication ==
The first novel in the series, Through Wolf's Eyes, was first published in 2001 through Tor Books. The next three novels, Wolf's Head, Wolf's Heart, The Dragon of Despair, and Wolf Captured, were published consecutively over the following years, also through Tor Books. Lindskold released two more books in the series through this publisher, Wolf Hunting (2006) and Wolf's Blood (2007). The series was then moved to the publisher Obsidian Tiger, through which the novels Wolf's Search and Wolf's Soul were released in 2019 and 2020, respectively.

Cover art for the novels released through Tor Books was created by Julie Bell. Lindskold dubbed these covers "second look covers", defining the term as "while eye-catching in some fashion, demand that the reader pause long enough to take a second look or even to read the jacket copy for the true nature of the novel to emerge." Bell would go on to create the cover art for Wolf's Search and the cover for Wolf's Soul was based on Bell's piece “Three Hungry Wolves".

== Comic adaptation ==
In 2006 Dabel Brothers Productions acquired the comic license for the Firekeeper Saga, with the intent to make it into an ongoing series. Sean Jordan was named as the series' script writer and director.

== Reception ==
Critical reception for the novels have been positive. Lindskold has received praise for her portrayal of wolves and for her world and characters.
