= East Hebron, New Hampshire =

Unincorporated community in New Hampshire, United States

- Unincorporated community
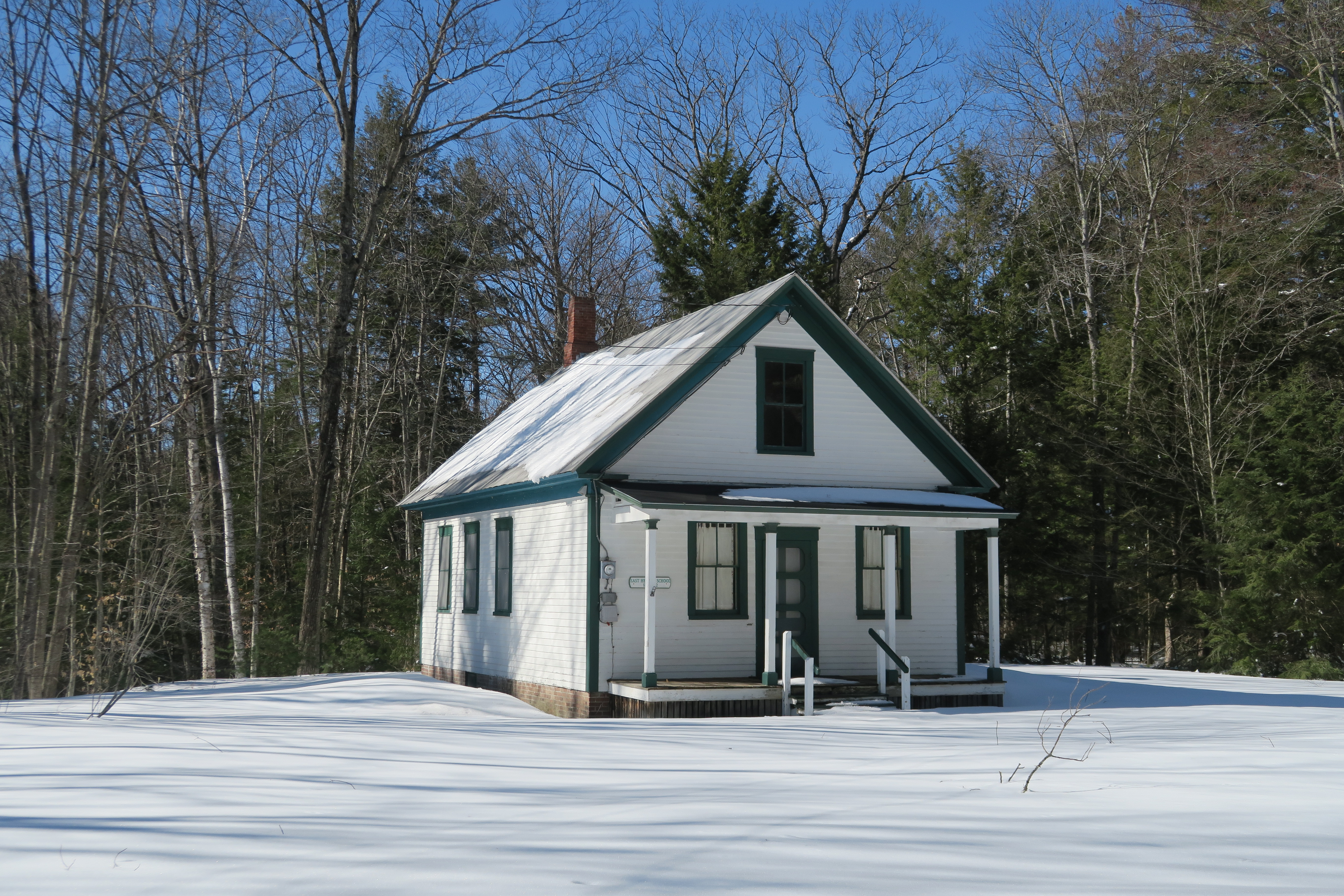
- East Hebron School

- Location within New Hampshire Location within the United States
- Coordinates: 43°41′36″N 71°46′10″W
- Country: United States
- State: New Hampshire
- County: Grafton
- Town: Hebron
- Elevation: 676 ft (206 m)
- Time zone: UTC-5 (Eastern (EST))
  - Summer (DST): UTC-4 (EDT)
- ZIP code: 03232
- Area code: 603
- GNIS feature ID: 866708

East Hebron is an unincorporated community in the town of Hebron in Grafton County, New Hampshire, United States.

It is located along New Hampshire Route 3A on the east side of Newfound Lake. Route 3A connects Bristol to the south with Plymouth to the north.

East Hebron has a separate ZIP code (03232) from the rest of the town of Hebron.
