= Pyrénée =

1998 French graphic novel

Pyrénée with the bear and her teddy bear

Pyrénée is a 1998 French feral child graphic novel (bande dessinée) by Regis Loisel and Philippe Sternis, about a feral girl who is brought up in the mountains of the French Pyrenees by a bear.

== Plot summary ==
When a huge earthquake devastates a town in the French Pyrenees, a bear escapes from a circus in the confusion and later finds a small girl whose mother has been killed in the quake. The bear rescues the girl (and her teddy bear) and raises her as his own cub like a female version of Rudyard Kipling's Mowgli, high in the inaccessible mountains, naming her "Pyrénée" after them. Later on she also learns philosophy and wisdom from a blind old eagle, learns to hunt and fish, and eventually has to find her way back to human society.

== Inspirations ==
The French Pyrenees were home to two people that may have served as inspiration for the story. The Girl of Issaux, lost in the snow at the age of 8 and captured at the age of 16 (circa 1719), and also La Folle des Pyrénées (captured 1807 at the age of about 40) who was not feral but lived with the bears. The story also draws some parallels to another story of a wild child of French origin – Victor of Aveyron.

== See also ==
- List of fictional feral children
