= Salani (publisher) =

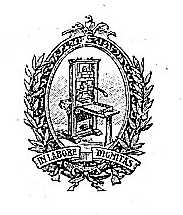

Salani is an Italian book publisher founded in 1862, in Florence by Adriano Salani. The publisher initially started selling broadsheets and popular song lyrics via street book peddlers. In 2020 Nicola Gardini was named president of the publishing group, after the death of long time president Luigi Spagnol.
