= The Dictator's Moustaches =

Book by Anna Russo

- First edition
- Author: Anna Russo
- Original title: Il baffo del dittatore
- Language: Italian
- Genre: Philosophical novel
- Publisher: Mursia
- Publication date: 2009
- Publication place: Italy
- Media type: Print
- Pages: 99 pages
- ISBN: 978-88-425-4460-9

The Dictator's Moustaches (Il baffo del dittatore) is a novel by writer Anna Russo. Published in 2009, the book looks at World War II from the viewpoint of a dog.

== Plot ==
Taking place in World War II, People are starving, cold and frightened, no longer capable of feeling love. An abandoned newborn is saved by a heroic little white dog. The dog adopts the baby, calls him Arf and raises Arf among her four-legged friends. The baby is half-dog, half-human and grows up to be strong, happy and above all to be unknowing of all the cruelty in the world.

One day, the boy is discovered, arrested and taken to a prison camp. The camp is turned upside down by Arf's innocence, the innocence of someone who has never had anything at all. He confuses the prison guards and upsets all the rules. When one day, by chance, the Führer shows up in person in the camp, it seems that Arf can even change the course of the war.
