= Mowgli syndrome =

Term created by Wendy Doniger O'Flaherty

"Mowgli syndrome" is a term used by Wendy Doniger O'Flaherty in her book Other Peoples’ Myths: The Cave of Echoes to describe mythological figures who succeed in bridging the human and animal worlds to become one with nature, a human animal, only to become trapped between the two worlds, not completely animal yet not entirely human. Another literary account described this term as a birth defect that results from sexual relations between a human and a shapeshifter in animal form.

It is also a rarely used descriptive term for the so-called feral children. These are individuals who are not properly socialized, hence, incapable of normal social interaction. They could have limited speech ability and mental impairment or underdeveloped mental faculties. Other symptoms may include fear of humans and a lack of interest in human activities. The term "Mowgli syndrome", however, is not a recognized psychological or physiological malady. The term originates from the character Mowgli, a fictional feral child from Rudyard Kipling’s The Jungle Book (1894).

== See also ==
- Feral children in mythology and fiction
