= Jane Lindskold =

American speculative fiction writer (born 1962)

Jane M. Lindskold
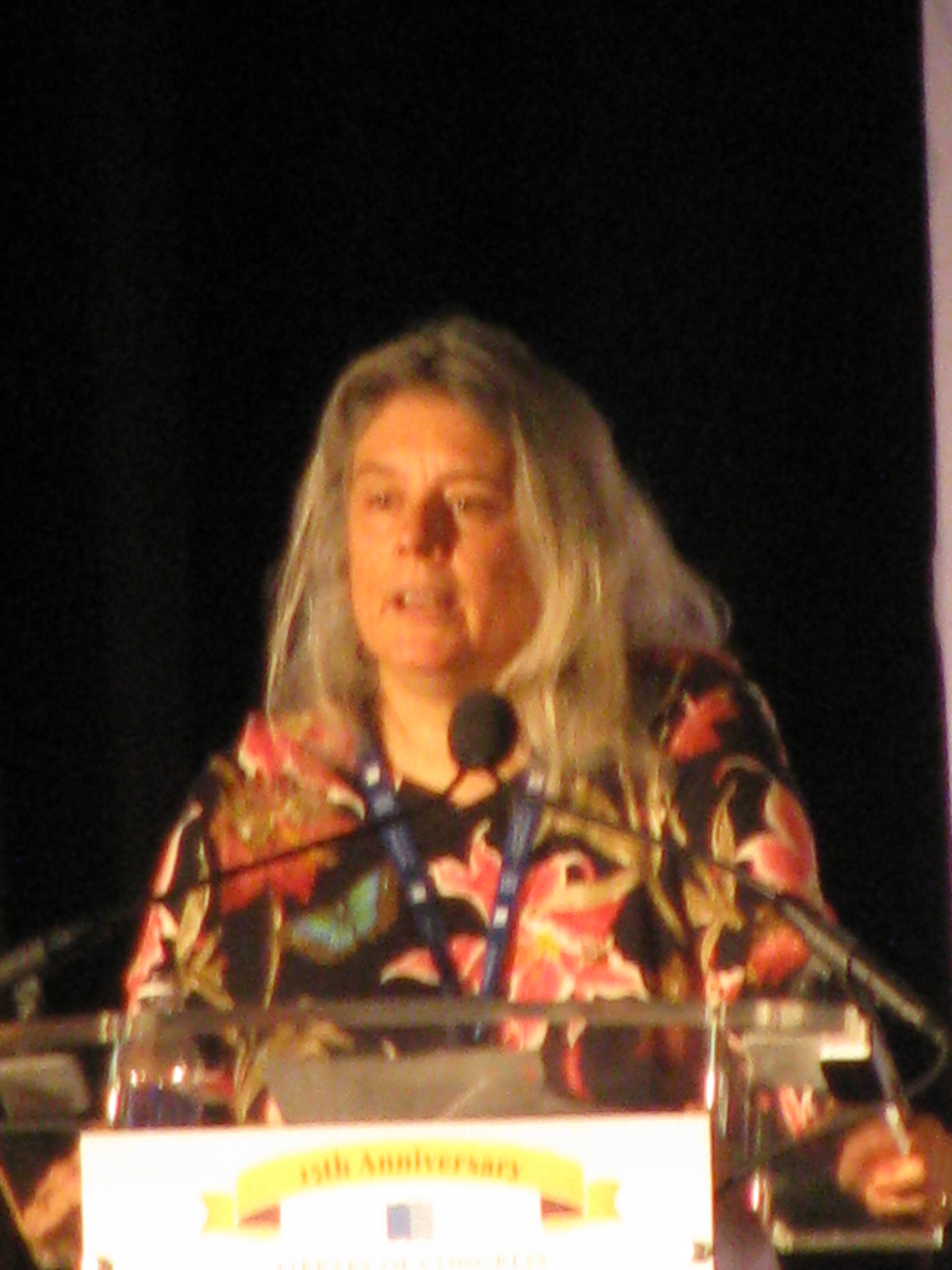
- Jane Lindskold in 2015
- Born: September 15, 1962 (age 63)
- Occupation: Author
- Writing career
- Genres: Science fiction, fantasy

Jane M. Lindskold (born September 15, 1962) is an American writer of fantasy and science fiction short stories and novels.

== Early life ==
Jane M. Lindskold was born on 15 September 1962, and grew up in Washington, D.C., and the Chesapeake Bay area. Jane is the first of four siblings, the others being Ann M. Lindskold Nalley, Graydon M. Lindskold, and Susan M. Lindskold Speer. Lindskold's father, John E. Lindskold, was head of the Land and Natural Resources Division, Western Division of the United States Justice Department. Her mother, Barbara DiSalle Lindskold, daughter of Ohio Governor Michael DiSalle, also was an attorney. Jane received a Ph.D. in English from Fordham, concentrating on Medieval, Renaissance, and Modern British Literature.

== Literary work ==
Mentored by her friend Roger Zelazny, she started publishing stories in 1992 and published her first novel, Brother to Dragons, Companion to Owls, in December, 1994. In her Athanor series, she writes about the creatures of legend — shape-shifters, satyrs, merfolk, and unicorns — who have sworn to keep their existence hidden from a human race prone to kill what it does not understand. In her Firekeeper Saga, she writes about a woman who discovers that politics among the wolves she was raised by and politics among human royalty are not so different. Lindskold was later in a relationship with Zelazny; at the time of his death, they were living together. She later completed two novels on the basis of notes and partial drafts left by him, Donnerjack and Lord Demon.

== Critical reception ==
Charles de Lint, reviewing Changer, praised "Lindskold's ability to tell a fast-paced, contemporary story that still carries the weight and style of old mythological story cycles." Terri Windling called Brother to Dragons, Companion to Owls "a complex, utterly original work of speculative fiction."

Lindskold lives in Albuquerque, New Mexico, with her husband, archaeologist Jim Moore.

== Bibliography ==
=== The Athanor series ===
- Changer (1998)
- Legends Walking (1999); republished in 2012 as Changer's Daughter: A Novel of the Athanor

=== The Firekeeper Saga ===
- Through Wolf's Eyes (2001)
- Wolf's Head, Wolf's Heart (2002)
- The Dragon of Despair (2003)
- Wolf Captured (2004)
- Wolf Hunting (2006)
- Wolf's Blood (2007)
- Wolf's Search (2019)
- Wolf's Soul (2020)

=== Breaking the Wall (a.k.a. Land of Smoke and Sacrifice) series ===
- Thirteen Orphans (2008)
- Nine Gates (2009)
- Five Odd Honors (2010)

=== Captain Ah-Lee series ===
(Novellas all, published only as e-books)

- Endpoint Insurance (2011)
- Here to There (2011)
- Star Messenger (2011)
- Winner Take Trouble (2011)

=== Star Kingdom series (with David Weber) ===
David Weber was the sole author of the first book, A Beautiful Friendship

- Fire Season (2012)
- Treecat Wars (2013)
- A New Clan (2022)
- Friends Indeed (2025)

=== Artemis Awakening series ===
- Artemis Awakening (2014)
- Artemis Invaded (2015)

=== Overwhere series ===
1. Library of the Sapphire Wind (2022)
2. Aurora Borealis Bridge (2022)
3. House of Rough Diamonds (2023)

=== Other novels ===
- Brother to Dragons, Companion to Owls (1994)
- Marks of Our Brothers (1995)
- The Pipes of Orpheus (1995)
- Smoke and Mirrors (1996)
- When the Gods are Silent (1997)
- Donnerjack (1997) with Roger Zelazny
- Lord Demon (1999) with Roger Zelazny
- The Buried Pyramid (2004)
- Child of a Rainless Year (2005)
- Asphodel (2018)

=== Stories ===
- "Good Boy" (1992)
- "Dark Lady" (1995)
- "Domino's Tale" (1995)
- "Kangaroo Straight" (1995)
- "Relief" (1995)
- "The Seventh Martial Art" (1995)
- "Teapot" (1995)
- "Noh Cat Afternoon" in Catfantastic IV (1996)
- "Child of the Night" (1996)
- "A Dreaming of Dead Poets (1996)
- "Web-Surfing Past Lives (1996)
- "Hell's Mark (1997)
- "Small Heroes (1997)
- "Auspicious Stars (1998)
- "Winner Takes Trouble (1998)
- "The Queen's Gambit" in Worlds of Honor (1999)
- "The Beanstalk Incident" (1999)
- "Out of Hot Water" (1999)
- "The Big Lie" (2000)
- "Endpoint Insurance" (2000)
- "On the Edge of Sleep" (2000)
- "Ruins of the Past" (2000)
- "Sacrifice" (2000)
- "The Road to Stony Creek" in The Blue and the Gray Undercover (2001)
- "Promised Land" in The Service of the Sword (2003)
- "Pakeha" in Visions of Liberty (2004)
- "Ruthless" in In Fire Forged (2011)

=== Non-fiction ===
- Roger Zelazny (biography, 1993)
- Chronomaster: The Official Strategy Guide (1996)
- Wanderings on Writing (2014)

=== Critical studies and reviews of Lindskold's work ===
- De Lint, Charles (Jul 2000). "[Review of Legends Walking]". Books to Look For. F&SF. 99 (1): 27–31. Archived from the original on December 27, 2004.
