= Philippe Sternis =

French cartoonist

Philippe Sternis (born September 30, 1952, in Neuilly-sur-Seine, France) is a French cartoonist.

His work is mainly targeted for the children and teenage audience. He is a regular collaborator for the publications of the French press group Bayard Presse, who published his first work in 1974 in the magazine "Record".

Since 2005, he has illustrated the children's novels "Princesse Zélina" (9 of 16 published books are illustrated by Sternis).

He is the organizer of the comics festival of Melun Val de Seine, attended by 7000 people every two years.

== Bibliography ==
- Histoire de la vie des hommes for La Pibole
  - "100.000 dollars pour un troupeau" 1980
- Snark Saga - Sternis and Cothias for BD Okapi.
  - Book 1 : "L'Oiseau Bleu" - 1982
  - Book 2 : "Le Lapin Blanc" - 1983
- Les grandes batailles de l'histoire for Larousse
  - Book 6 : "La Guerre de Sécession" 1984
- Trafic - Sternis and Cothias for BD Okapi, awarded with Prix Jeunesse 9-12 ans at Angoulême International Comics Festival, France in 1985
- Memory - Sternis and Cothias for Glénat
  - Book 1 : "Le Bal des Mandibules" 1986
  - Book 2 : "Le Cargo sous la mer" 1987
  - Book 3 : "le Nécromobile" 1988
- Mouche for Bayard
  - Book 1 : "La rivière Fantôme" 1989
  - Book 2 : "Le Bateau d'Antoine" 1992
- Solo - Sternis and Claude Carré 1994 chez Dargaud
- Pyrénée - Sternis and Loisel in 1998 for Vents d'Ouest
- Robinson Book 1 - Sternis in 2001 for Vents d'Ouest
- Mouche - "La rivière Fantôme" (re-colored reprint) in 2005 for Des Ronds dans l’O
