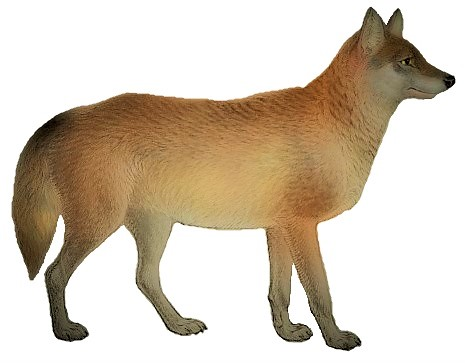
- Illustration based on a description by Edward Alphonso Goldman

Scientific classification
- Kingdom: Animalia
- Phylum: Chordata
- Class: Mammalia
- Infraclass: Placentalia
- Order: Carnivora
- Family: Canidae
- Genus: Canis
- Species: C. lupus
- Subspecies: C. l. fuscus

Trinomial name
- Canis lupus fuscus Richardson, 1839
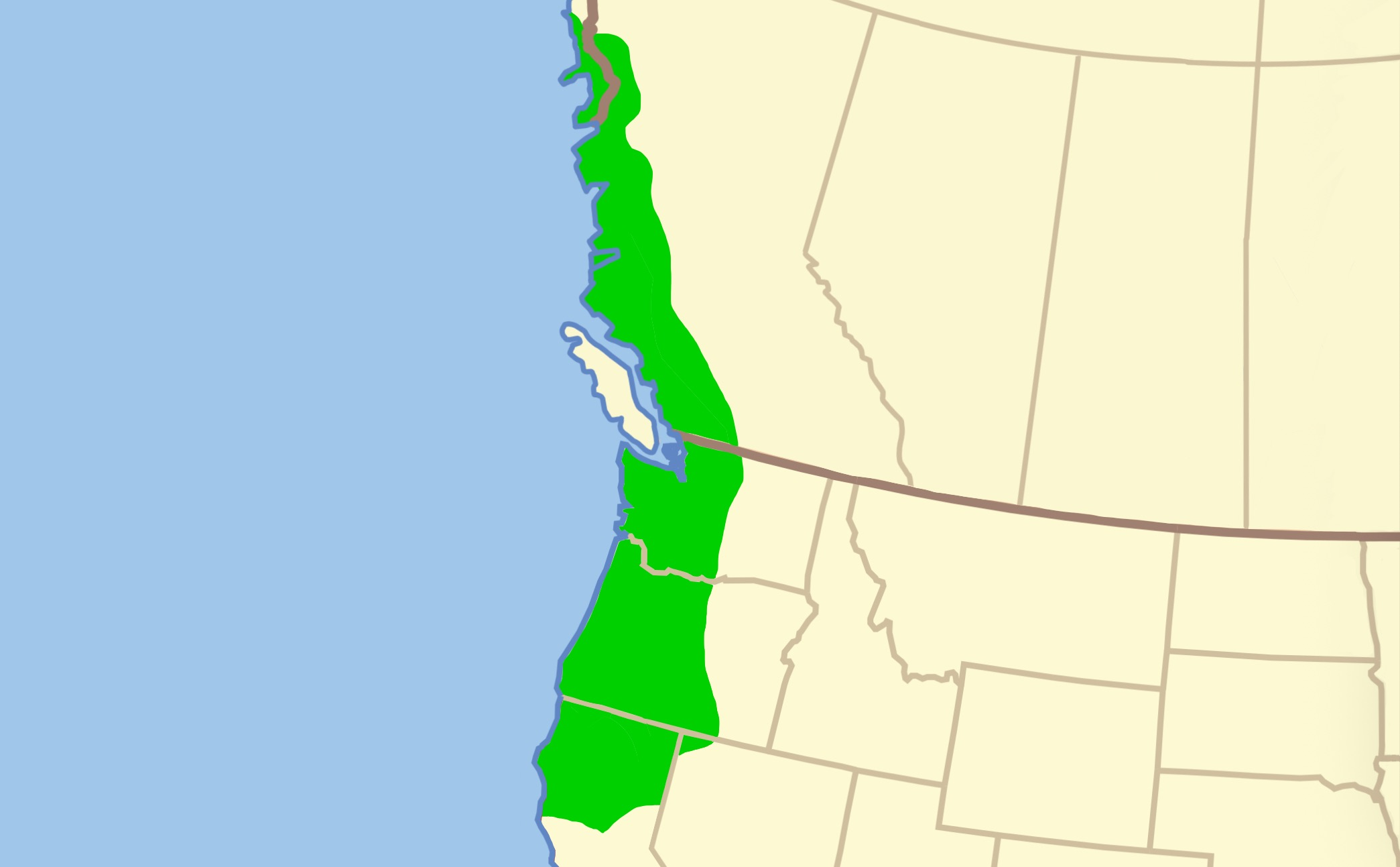
- Former range of the Cascade Mountain wolf

Synonyms
- List: Canis lupus gigas; Lupus gigas Townsend, 1850; Canis gigas

= Cascade mountain wolf =

Cascade Mountains wolf

Extinct subspecies of carnivore

The Cascade mountain wolf (Canis lupus fuscus) is a subspecies of the gray wolf that is found in coastal British Columbia. It historically inhabited Oregon, Washington, and California, but has been extirpated in those areas. It has a cinnamon-coloured coat and is a large wolf, measuring 165 cm (65 in) in length.

Currently, the Cascade mountain wolf is found around the British Columbia Coast. Its ancestors migrated from the Great Plains into the Cascade Range once the Cordilleran ice sheet retreated there.

== Taxonomy ==
It was originally identified as a variety of wolf by Scottish naturalist Sir John Richardson in 1839, classifying wolves from northern California and the Columbia valley into this variety. Edward Goldman classified it as a subspecies of wolf in 1945. It is recognized as a subspecies of Canis lupus in the taxonomic authority Mammal Species of the World (2005).

=== Evolution ===
Gray wolves (Canis lupus) migrated from Eurasia into North America 70,000–23,000 years ago and gave rise to at least two morphologically and genetically distinct groups. One group is represented by the extinct Beringian wolf and the other by the modern populations. One author proposes that the Cascade mountains wolf forms part of a clade whose ancestors were the second wolves to cross the Bering land bridge into North America.

Until the end of the Pleistocene, the area in which the Cascade mountain wolf inhabited was covered in the Cordilleran ice sheet. After these sheets retreated, wolves from the Southern Great Plains migrated into this area.

== Description ==
It is a cinnamon-coloured wolf, measuring 165 cm (65 in) in length and weighing 36–49 kg (79–108 lb). This subspecies was also referred as the "brown wolf" because of its cinnamon or buff fur.

== Distribution ==
This subspecies was found in Pacific Northwest, and was one of three coastal wolf subspecies found in the British Columbia Coast. Its range extended southwards to Northern California and northeastern Nevada. The Cascade mountain wolf was found in southeastern Alaska, which marked the northern limit of its range.

The southernmost specimen of this subspecies was an individual who was trapped in Lassen County, California, in 1924. This was the last wolf in California before OR-7 travelled into the state from Oregon in December 2011. Currently, it is found around the coast of central British Columbia, including the islands surrounding it, such as Porcher, Pitt, Banks, Aristazabal, and Price.
