= List of science fiction novels =

This is a list of science fiction novels, novel series and collections of linked short stories. It includes modern novels, as well as novels written before the term "science fiction" was in common use. This list includes novels not marketed as SF but still considered to be substantially science fiction in content by some critics, such as Nineteen Eighty-Four. As such, it is an inclusive list, not an exclusive list based on other factors such as level of notability or literary quality. Books are listed in alphabetical order by title, ignoring the leading articles "A", "An" and "The". Novel series are alphabetical by author-designated name or, if there is none, the title of the first novel in the series or some other reasonable designation.

Lists of novel titles by various differentiators can be found at Category:Science fiction novels.

== 0-9 ==
- 334 by Thomas M. Disch
- 1Q84 by Haruki Murakami
- 1632 series by Eric Flint
- 2001: A Space Odyssey by Arthur C. Clarke
- 2010: Odyssey Two by Arthur C. Clarke
- 2061: Odyssey Three by Arthur C. Clarke
- 2066: Red Star Over America by Han Song
- 2312 by Kim Stanley Robinson
- 3001: The Final Odyssey by Arthur C. Clarke

== A ==
- Admiral by Sean Danker
- Absolution Gap by Alastair Reynolds
- Accelerando by Charles Stross
- Acidity by Nadeem F. Paracha
- Across the Universe by Beth Revis
- Address: Centauri by F. L. Wallace
- Adulthood Rites, Book Two of Xenogenesis Series by Octavia Butler
- After Doomsday by Poul Anderson
- Against the Fall of Night, by Arthur C. Clarke
- An Age by Brian Aldiss
- The Age of the Pussyfoot, by Frederik Pohl
- Agent of Vega by James H. Schmitz
- Air by Geoff Ryman
- Alas, Babylon by Pat Frank
- Alastor Cluster series by Jack Vance
  - namely, Trullion: Alastor 2262, Marune: Alastor 933 and Wyst: Alastor 1716
- The Alejandra Variations by Paul Cook
- Aleriel, or A Voyage to Other Worlds by W. S. Lach-Szyrma
- The Algebraist by Iain M. Banks
- All Our Wrong Todays by Elan Mastai
- All You Need Is Kill by Hiroshi Sakurazaka
- Alpha Centauri or Die! by Leigh Bracket
- Altered Carbon by Richard K. Morgan
- Ammonite by Nicola Griffith
- Amped by Daniel H. Wilson
- An Absolutely Remarkable Thing by Hank Green
- Ancient Shores by Jack McDevitt
- Ancillary Justice by Ann Leckie
  - Imperial Radch Series: Ancillary Justice, Ancillary Sword and Ancillary Mercy
- Andromeda: A Space-Age Tale by Ivan Efremov
- The Andromeda Strain by Michael Crichton
- Andymon by Angela and Karlheinz Steinmüller
- The Angry Espers by Lloyd Biggle Jr.
- Anima by Marie Buchanan
- Animorphs by K. A. Applegate
- Annals of the Twenty-Ninth Century by Andrew Blair
- Anthem by Ayn Rand
- Anthony Villiers series by Alexei Panshin
  - namely, Star Well, The Thurb Revolution and Masque World
- Ares Express by Ian McDonald
- Artemis by Andy Weir
- The Artist of the Beautiful by Nathaniel Hawthorne
- As the Green Star Rises by Lin Carter
- Asgard series by Brian Stableford
- Attack from Atlantis by Lester del Rey
- Atlas Shrugged by Ayn Rand
- The Atrocity Exhibition by J. G. Ballard
- Autour de la Lune (also known as Around the Moon and Round the Moon) by Jules Verne

== B ==
- Babel-17 by Samuel R. Delany
- The Bane of Yoto by Josh Viola
- Barsoom series by Edgar Rice Burroughs
  - namely, A Princess of Mars, The Gods of Mars, The Warlord of Mars. Thuvia, Maid of Mars, The Chessmen of Mars, The Master Mind of Mars, A Fighting Man of Mars, Swords of Mars, Synthetic Men of Mars, Llana of Gathol and John Carter of Mars
- Battle Angel Alita by Yukito Kishiro
- Battlefield Earth by L. Ron Hubbard
- The Beast Master by Andre Norton
- A Beautifully Foolish Endeavor by Hank Green
- The Berlin Project by Gregory Benford
- Berserker by Fred Saberhagen
- Between Planets by Robert A. Heinlein
- Beyond Apollo by Barry N. Malzberg
- The Beyond the Red trilogy by Gabe (as Ava Jae)
- Bicentennial Man by Isaac Asimov
- The Big Jump by Leigh Brackett
- Big Planet series by Jack Vance
  - namely, Big Planet and Showboat World
- The Big Time by Fritz Leiber
- The Bikers series by Alex R. Stuart
- Binti series by Nnedi Okorafor
- Black by Ted Dekker
- The Black Cloud by Fred Hoyle
- The Black Corridor by Michael Moorcock
- Black Legion of Callisto by Lin Carter
- Blackstar by Josh Viola
- Blast Off at Woomera by Hugh Walters
- The Blazing World by
- Blood Music by Greg Bear
- Bloodchild and Other Stories by Octavia Butler
- The Blue Barbarians by Stanton A. Coblentz
- The Blue Man by Kin Platt
- The Blue World by Jack Vance
- The Book of Skulls by Robert Silverberg
- Borgel by Daniel Pinkwater
- Brain Wave by Poul Anderson
- Brasyl by Ian McDonald
- Brave New World by Aldous Huxley
- Breakfast of Champions (or Goodbye, Blue Monday!) by Kurt Vonnegut Jr.
- Briah cycle by Gene Wolfe, several nested sub-series:
  - The Book of the New Sun
    - namely, The Shadow of the Torturer, The Claw of the Conciliator, The Sword of the Lictor, The Citadel of the Autarch, The Urth of the New Sun
  - The Book of the Long Sun
    - namely, Nightside the Long Sun, Lake of the Long Sun, Calde of the Long Sun and Exodus from the Long Sun
  - The Book of the Short Sun
    - namely, On Blue's Waters, In Green's Jungles and Return to the Whorl
- The Brick Moon by Edward Everett Hale
- Brother Termite by Patricia Anthony
- Bug Jack Barron by Norman Spinrad
- The Bull's Hour by Ivan Yefremov (a sequel to Andromeda)
- The Butterfly Kid by Chester Anderson
- By the Light of the Green Star by Lin Carter

== C ==
- Cadwal Chronicles series by Jack Vance
  - namely, Araminta Station, Ecce and Old Earth and Throy
- Caesar's Column, by Ignatius Donnelly
- Calculating God by Robert J. Sawyer
- The Calcutta Chromosome by Amitav Ghosh
- Camp Concentration by Thomas M. Disch
- The Canopy of Time by Brian W. Aldiss
- A Canticle for Leibowitz by Walter M. Miller Jr.
- The Captive's War series by James S. A. Corey
  - namely, The Mercy of Gods and Livesuit
- Carnival by Elizabeth Bear
- A Case of Conscience by James Blish
- Cat Country by Lao She
- Cat's Cradle by Kurt Vonnegut Jr.
- The Caves of Steel by Isaac Asimov (the sequel is The Naked Sun)
- Celestial Matters by Richard Garfinkle
- The Centauri Device by M. John Harrison
- Century Rain by Alastair Reynolds
- Chanur series by C. J. Cherryh
  - namely, The Pride of Chanur, Chanur's Venture, The Kif Strike Back, Chanur's Homecoming and Chanur's Legacy
- Chaos Terminal by Mur Lafferty
- Chasm City by Alastair Reynolds
- Child of Fortune by Norman Spinrad
- Childhood's End by Arthur C. Clarke
- Children of Time by Adrian Tchaikovsky
  - series, Children of Ruin and Children of Memory
- Children of Tomorrow by A. E. van Vogt
- China 2185 by Liu Cixin
- Chromosome 6 by Robin Cook
- The Chrysalids by John Wyndham
- Citizen of the Galaxy by Robert A. Heinlein
- City by Clifford D. Simak
- The City and the Stars by Arthur C. Clarke
- City of Bones by Martha Wells
- City of Illusions by Ursula K. Le Guin
- The City Outside the World by Lin Carter
- Clans of the Alphane Moon by Philip K. Dick
- Clay's Ark by Octavia Butler
- A Clockwork Orange by Anthony Burgess
- Close to Critical by Hal Clement
- Coalescent by Stephen Baxter
- Code of the Lifemaker by James P. Hogan
- Composite Creatures by Caroline Hardaker
- Congo by Michael Crichton
- The Consciousness Plague by Paul Levinson
- Consider Phlebas by Iain M. Banks
- Contact by Carl Sagan
- Count Zero by William Gibson
- Cradle by Arthur C. Clarke and Gentry Lee
- Creation Node by Stephen Baxter
- Creatures of Light and Darkness by Roger Zelazny
- The Crossroads of Time by Andre Norton
- Cryptonomicon by Neal Stephenson
  - also The Baroque Cycle, namely Quicksilver, The Confusion and The System of the World
- Crystal Rain by Tobias S. Buckell
- Cuckoo's Egg by C. J. Cherryh
- Culture series by Iain M. Banks
  - namely, Consider Phlebas, The Player of Games, Use of Weapons, The State of the Art, Excession, Inversions, Look to Windward, Matter, Surface Detail, The Hydrogen Sonata
- The Currents of Space by Isaac Asimov
- Cyteen by C. J. Cherryh
- Cyborg by Martin Caidin

== D ==
- Daedalus Mission series by Brian Stableford
  - namely, The Florians, Critical Threshold, Wildeblood's Empire, The City of the Sun, Balance of Power and The Paradox of the Sets
- Daemon by Daniel Suarez
- Damnation Alley by Roger Zelazny
- Danny Dunn series by Raymond Abrashkin and Jay Williams
  - namely, Danny Dunn and the Anti-Gravity Paint, Danny Dunn on a Desert Island, Danny Dunn and the Homework Machine, Danny Dunn and the Weather Machine, Danny Dunn on the Ocean Floor, Danny Dunn and the Fossil Cave, Danny Dunn and the Heat Ray, Danny Dunn, Time Traveler, Danny Dunn and the Automatic House, Danny Dunn and the Voice From Space, Danny Dunn and the Smallifying Machine, Danny Dunn and the Swamp Monster, Danny Dunn, Invisible Boy, Danny Dunn Scientific Detective, Danny Dunn and the Universal Glue
- Dark Beyond the Stars by Frank M. Robinson
- The Dark Side of the Sun by Terry Pratchett
- Dark Universe by Daniel F. Galouye
- The Darwin Elevator by Jason M. Hough
- Darwin's Radio by Greg Bear
- David's Sling by Marc Stiegler
- The Day of the Triffids by John Wyndham
- The Defiant Agents by Andre Norton (the sequel to Galactic Derelict)
- Delta-v by Daniel Suarez
- The Demolished Man by Alfred Bester
- Demon by John Varley
- Demon Princes series by Jack Vance
  - namely, Star King, The Killing Machine, The Palace of Love, The Face and The Book of Dreams
- Le Dernier Homme (also known as The Last Man and Omegarus and Syderia: A Romance in Futurity) by Jean-Baptiste Cousin de Grainville
- Desolation Road by Ian McDonald
- Desolation Called Peace by Arkady Martine
- Destination: Saturn by David Grinnell and Lin Carter
- Destination Mars by Hugh Walters
- Destination: Void by Frank Herbert
- Dhalgren by Samuel R. Delany
- The Diamond Age by Neal Stephenson
- Dies the Fire by S. M. Stirling
- Dies Irae series by Brian Stableford
  - namely, The Days of Glory, In the Kingdom of the Beasts and Day of Wrath
- Digital Devil Story by Aya Nishitani.
- The Dispossessed by Ursula K. Le Guin
- Distress by Greg Egan
- Divergent trilogy by Veronica Roth
- Do Androids Dream of Electric Sheep? by Philip K. Dick
- The Domes of Pico by Hugh Walters
- Doomsday Book by Connie Willis
- The Dosadi Experiment by Frank Herbert
- Down and Out in the Magic Kingdom by Cory Doctorow
- Down to a Sunless Sea by David Graham
- Downbelow Station by C. J. Cherryh
- The Dragon Masters by Jack Vance
- Dragonriders of Pern by Anne McCaffrey and Todd McCaffrey
- Drake Maijstral series by Walter Jon Williams
- Dream Park by Larry Niven and Steven Barnes
- Dreamsnake by Vonda N. McIntyre
- The Drowned World by J. G. Ballard
- The Dry Salvages by Caitlín R. Kiernan
- Dune by Frank Herbert
  - also Dune Messiah, Children of Dune, God Emperor of Dune, Heretics of Dune and Chapterhouse: Dune
- Durdane series by Jack Vance
  - namely, The Anome (a.k.a. The Faceless Man), The Brave Free Men (a.k.a. The Roguskhoi) and The Asutra
- Dying Inside by Robert Silverberg

== E ==
- Earth Abides by George R. Stewart
- Earthborn by Orson Scott Card
- Earthbound by Milton Lesser
- Earthseed by Pamela Sargent
- Echo in the Skull by John Brunner
- Eden by Stanislaw Lem
- Einstein's Dreams by Alan Lightman
- Emergence by David R. Palmer
- Emortality series by Brian Stableford
  - namely, The Cassandra Complex, Inherit the Earth, Architects of Emortality, Fountains of Youth, Dark Ararat and The Omega Expedition
- Emphyrio by Jack Vance
- Empire by Orson Scott Card
- Empire Star by Samuel Delany
- Empire of the Atom by A. E. van Vogt
- En Iniya Iyanthira by Sujatha
  - also Meendum Jeano
- Encounter With Tiber by Buzz Aldrin and John Barnes
- The End of Eternity by Isaac Asimov
- Ender's Game by Orson Scott Card
  - also Speaker for the Dead, Xenocide, Children of the Mind, Ender's Shadow, Shadow Puppets, Shadow of the Hegemon, Shadow of the Giant and Ender in Exile
- The Enemy Stars by Poul Anderson
- Eon by Greg Bear
- Erewhon by Samuel Butler
- Escape to Witch Mountain by Alexander Key
- Eternity Road by Jack McDevitt
- Excession by Iain M. Banks
- The Exodus Towers by Jason M. Hough
- The Expanse series by James S. A. Corey
  - namely, Leviathan Wakes, Caliban's War, Abaddon's Gate, Cibola Burn, Nemesis Games, Babylon's Ashes, Persepolis Rising, Tiamat's Wrath, Leviathan Falls and Memory's Legion
- Expedition Venus by Hugh Walters
- The Eye of the Heron by Ursula K. Le Guin
- The Eyes series by Stuart Gordon

== F ==
- The Facts in the Case of M. Valdemar by Edgar Allan Poe
- Faded Sun series by C. J. Cherryh
  - namely, Kesrith, Shon'jir and Kutath
- Fahrenheit 451 by Ray Bradbury
- A Fall of Moondust by Arthur C. Clarke
- A Far Sunset by Edmund Cooper
- Farewell Horizontal by K. W. Jeter
- Farnham's Freehold by Robert A. Heinlein
- Fearful Symmetries by S. Andrew Swann
- Feersum Endjinn by Iain M. Banks
- The Female Man by Joanna Russ
- The Fifth Head of Cerberus by Gene Wolfe
- Fifth Planet by Fred Hoyle
- The Fifth Sacred Thing by Starhawk
- Firebird by Kathy Tyers
  - also Fusion Fire and Crown of Fire
- First Men in the Moon by H. G. Wells
- Five Against Venus by Philip Latham (nom de plume of Robert S. Richardson)
- Five Weeks in a Balloon by Jules Verne
- Fledgling by Octavia Butler
- Flight from Rebirth by J. T. McIntosh
- The Flight of the Dragonfly (Rocheworld) by Robert Forward
- Flow My Tears, The Policeman Said by Philip K. Dick
- Flowers for Algernon (novel version) by Daniel Keyes
- Fool's Run by Patricia A. McKillip
- Footfall by Larry Niven and Jerry Pournelle
- For the First Time, Again by Sylvain Neuvel
- Fossil by Hal Clement
- The Forever War by Joe Haldeman
  - also Forever Free, Forever Peace
- Found Wanting by Lin Carter
- Foundation by Isaac Asimov
  - also Foundation and Empire, Second Foundation, Foundation's Edge, Foundation and Earth, Prelude to Foundation (prequel) and Forward the Foundation (prequel)
- Frankenstein by Mary Shelley
- Free Live Free by Gene Wolfe
- Friday by Robert A. Heinlein
- The Future of New China by Liang Qichao
- De la Terre a la Lune (also known as From the Earth to the Moon) by Jules Verne
- The Futurological Congress by Stanisław Lem

== G ==
- Galactic Derelict by Andre Norton (the sequel to The Time Traders)
- Galactic Effectuator by Jack Vance
- Galactic Pot-Healer by Philip K. Dick
- Galaxies Like Grains of Sand by Brian W. Aldiss
- The Game-Players of Titan by Philip K. Dick
- The Gap Cycle by Stephen R. Donaldson
- The Garden by Nick Newman
- Garden of Rama by Arthur C. Clarke and Gentry Lee
- Gateway by Frederik Pohl
- Genesis Alpha by Rune Michaels (2007)
- Give Warning to the World by John Brunner (see Echo in the Skull)
- The Giver by Lois Lowry
- Gladiator by Philip Wylie
- Gladiator-At-Law by C. M. Kornbluth and Frederik Pohl
- The Glass Bees by Ernst Jünger
- Glory Road by Robert A. Heinlein
- Gods of Riverworld by Philip José Farmer
- The Gods Themselves by Isaac Asimov
- The Golden Age by John C. Wright
- The Golden Globe by John Varley
- Gone series by Michael Grant
- Grass by Sheri S. Tepper
- The Gray Prince by Jack Vance
- The Great Explosion by Eric Frank Russell
- The Great Fetish by L. Sprague de Camp
- Gridlinked by Neal Asher
- The Gripping Hand by Larry Niven and Jerry Pournelle. Released as The Moat Around Murcheson's Eye in the United Kingdom.
- Gulf by Robert A. Heinlein

== H ==
- Halo – a video-game novelization series
  - namely, Halo: The Fall of Reach by Eric Nylund, Halo: The Flood by William C. Dietz, Halo: First Strike by Eric Nylund, Halo: Ghosts of Onyx by Eric Nylund, Halo: The Cole Protocol by Tobias S. Buckell, Halo: Contact Harvest by Joseph Staten, Halo: Evolutions (Essential Stories From The Halo Universe) by various authors, Halo: Evolutions (Volume 2) by various authors, Halo: Cryptum by Greg Bear.
- Halting State by Charles Stross
- The Hampdenshire Wonder by J. D. Beresford
- The Handmaid's Tale by Margaret Atwood
- The Haunted Stars by Edmond Hamilton
- Have Spacesuit, Will Travel by Robert A. Heinlein
- He, She and It by Marge Piercy
- Helliconia trilogy by Brian W. Aldiss
  - comprising Helliconia Spring, Helliconia Summer and Helliconia Winter
- Hidden World by Stanton A. Coblentz
- The High Crusade by Poul Anderson
- His Master's Voice by Stanisław Lem
- A History of What Comes Next by Sylvain Neuvel
- The Hitchhiker's Guide to the Galaxy series by Douglas Adams
  - namely, The Hitchhiker's Guide to the Galaxy; The Restaurant at the End of the Universe; Life, the Universe and Everything; So Long, and Thanks for All the Fish; and Mostly Harmless; continued by Eoin Colfier with And Another Thing
- Hole in the Sky by Daniel H. Wilson
- The Honour of the Knights by Stephen J Sweeney
- Hooded Swan series by Brian Stableford
  - namely, Halcyon Drift, Rhapsody in Black, Promised Land, The Paradise Game, The Fenris Device and Swan Song
- The Host by Stephenie Meyer
- The House of the Scorpion by Nancy Farmer
- The Houses of Iszm by Jack Vance
- The Hunger Games series by Suzanne Collins
- The Hydrogen Sonata by Iain M. Banks
- Hyperion by Dan Simmons
  - also The Fall of Hyperion, Endymion and The Rise of Endymion

== I ==
- I Am Legend by Richard Matheson
- I, Robot by Isaac Asimov
- Idlewild by Nick Sagan
- Ilium by Dan Simmons
  - also Olympos
- Imperial Earth by Arthur C. Clarke
- Implosion by D.F. Jones
- In the Courts of the Crimson Kings by S. M. Stirling
- In the Mouth of the Whale by Paul J. McAuley
- Inferno by Larry Niven and Jerry Pournelle
- In the Green Star's Glow by Lin Carter
- Infinite Archive by Mur Lafferty
- The Infinite Man by Daniel F. Galouye
- Infinity Beach by Jack McDevitt. Released as Slow Lightning in the United Kingdom.
- The Integral Trees by Larry Niven
- Inter Ice Age 4 by Abe Kōbō
- Internet of Things - A Digital Thriller by Maulik Vyas
- Into the Drowning Deep by Mira Grant
- Into the Slave Nebula by John Brunner
- The Intuitionist by Con Whitehead
- The Invention of Morel by Adolfo Bioy Casares
- Inversions by Iain M. Banks
- Iron Council by China Miéville
- The Iron Dream by Norman Spinrad
- Iron Sunrise by Charles Stross
- The Island of Doctor Moreau by H. G. Wells
- Islands in the Sky by Arthur C. Clarke
- Isle of the Dead by Roger Zelazny

== J ==
- J. by William Sanders
- Jandar of Callisto by Lin Carter
- The Jedi Academy Trilogy by Kevin J. Anderson
- Jem, a 1980 book by Frederik Pohl
- Jennifer Government by Max Barry
- A Journey in Other Worlds by John Jacob Astor IV
- Journey to the Center of the Earth by Jules Verne
- Journey to Jupiter by Hugh Walters
- Journey to Mars by Gustavus W. Pope
- Journey to Venus by Gustavus W. Pope
- Jurassic Park by Michael Crichton

== K ==
- The Kaiju Preservation Society by John Scalzi
- Kaleidoscope Century by John Barnes
- Kalimantaan by Lucius Shepard
- Killobyte by Piers Anthony
- The Kin of Ata Are Waiting for You, by Dorothy Bryant
- Kindred by Octavia Butler
- King Rat by China Miéville (arguably fantasy)
- The Kraken Wakes (a.k.a. Out of the Deeps) by John Wyndham

== L ==
- Langdon St. Ives series by James Blaylock
  - namely, Homunculus, Lord Kelvin's Machine and The Digging Leviathan
- The Languages of Pao by Jack Vance
- Lamb by Matt Hill
- Lankar of Callisto by Lin Carter
- Last and First Men by Olaf Stapledon
- The Last Castle by Jack Vance
- The Lathe of Heaven by Ursula K. Le Guin
- League of Peoples series by James Alan Gardner
  - namely, Expendable, Commitment Hour, Vigilant, Hunted, Ascending, Trapped, Radiant
- Learning the World by Ken MacLeod
- The Left Hand of Darkness by Ursula K. Le Guin
- The Legacy of Heorot by Larry Niven, Jerry Pournelle and Steven Barnes
- Legion series by Brandon Sanderson
- The Legion of Space by Jack Williamson.
- Lensman series by E. E. Smith
  - namely, Triplanetary, First Lensman, Galactic Patrol, Gray Lensman, Second Stage Lensmen and Children of the Lens
- Level 7 by Mordecai Roshwald
- Life on Another Planet by Will Eisner
- Light by M. John Harrison
- Little Fuzzy by H. Beam Piper
- The Long Way to a Small, Angry Planet, by Becky Chambers
- Look to Windward by Iain M. Banks
- Looking Backward by Edward Bellamy
- Lord Kalvan of Otherwhen by H. Beam Piper
- Lord of Light by Roger Zelazny
- Lords of the Psychon by Daniel F. Galouye
- Lords of the Starship by Mark S. Geston
- The Lost Fleet series by Jack Campbell
- The Lost Planet by Angus MacVicar
- The Lost World by Michael Crichton
- The Lost World by Arthur Conan Doyle
- Lovelock by Orson Scott Card and Kathryn H. Kidd
- Lucky Starr series by Isaac Asimov (writing as Paul French)
  - namely, David Starr, Space Ranger, Lucky Starr and the Pirates of the Asteroids, Lucky Starr and the Oceans of Venus, Lucky Starr and the Big Sun of Mercury, Lucky Starr and the Moons of Jupiter and Lucky Starr and the Rings of Saturn
- The Lunar Chronicles series by Marissa Meyer

== M ==
- Macroscope by Piers Anthony
- Mad Empress of Callisto by Lin Carter
- Majipoor series by Robert Silverberg
  - namely, Lord Valentine's Castle, Valentine Pontifex, Majipoor Chronicles; there are more but of debated quality
- Make Room! Make Room! by Harry Harrison
- The Malacia Tapestry by Brian W. Aldiss
- Mammoth by John Varley
- The Man in the High Castle by Philip K. Dick
- Man Plus by Frederik Pohl
- The Man Who Fell to Earth by Walter Tevis
- The Man Who Folded Himself by David Gerrold
- The Man Who Loved Mars by Lin Carter
- The Man Without a Planet by Lin Carter
- The Map of Time by Felix J. Palma
- Marooned on Mars by Lester del Rey
- The Mars trilogy by Kim Stanley Robinson
- The Martian by Andy Weir
- The Martian Chronicles by Ray Bradbury
- Martian Time-Slip by Philip K. Dick
- Maske: Thaery by Jack Vance
- The Master by T. H. White
- Masters of Time by A. E. van Vogt
- Matter by Iain M. Banks
- A Maze of Death by Philip K. Dick
- The Maze Runner by James Dashner
- Mecha Samurai Empire series by Peter Tieryas
- Meendum Jeano by Sujatha
- A Meeting at Corvallis by S. M. Stirling
- The Memory of Earth by Orson Scott Card
  - also The Call of Earth, The Ships of Earth, Earthfall, Earthborn
- Memory Called Empire by Arkady Martine
- The Merchant and the Alchemist's Gate by Ted Chiang
- Micromégas by
- Midshipman's Hope by David Feintuch
  - see the Seafort Saga for its sequels
- The Midwich Cuckoos by John Wyndham
- Millennium by John Varley
- A Million Open Doors by John Barnes
- The Mind Cage by A. E. van Vogt
- Mind of My Mind by Octavia Butler
- Mind Wizards of Callisto by Lin Carter
- Ministry for the Future by Kim Stanley Robinson
- Mirabile by Janet Kagan
- Missing Men of Saturn by Philip Latham (nom de plume of Robert S. Richardson)
- Mission Earth by L. Ron Hubbard
- Mission of Gravity by Hal Clement
- Mistress Masham's Repose by T. H. White
- Mists of Dawn by Chad Oliver
- The Moat Around Murcheson's Eye by Larry Niven and Jerry Pournelle (this was the United Kingdom title, elsewhere it is known as The Gripping Hand)
- The Modular Man by Roger MacBride Allen, essay by Isaac Asimov
- Mona Lisa Overdrive by William Gibson
- Monsters of Ohio by John Scalzi
- The Moon and the Face by Patricia A. McKillip
- Moon Base One by Hugh Walters
- The Moon Is a Harsh Mistress by Robert A. Heinlein
- Moon of Mutiny by Lester del Rey
- Moon-Flash by Patricia A. McKillip
- More Than Human by Theodore Sturgeon
- The Moreau Quartet by S. Andrew Swann
- The Morgaine Stories by C. J. Cherryh
  - namely, Gate of Ivrel, Well of Shiuan, Fires of Azeroth and Exile's Gate
- The Mote in God's Eye by Larry Niven and Jerry Pournelle
- Mountains Oceans and Giants by Alfred Döblin
- The Mummy! - A Tale of the Twenty-Second Century by J. Webb
- Mythago Wood series by Robert Holdstock
  - namely, Mythago Wood, Lavondyss, The Bone Forest, The Hollowing, Merlin's Wood and Gate of Ivory, Gate of Horn

== N ==
- The Narrative of Arthur Gordon Pym of Nantucket (also known as The Narrative of Arthur Gordon Pym's Adventures) by Edgar Allan Poe
- Native Tongue by Suzette Haden Elgin
- Neanderthal Planet by Brian W. Aldiss
- NEQUA or The Problem of the Ages by Jack Adams
- Neuromancer by William Gibson
- Never Let Me Go by Kazuo Ishiguro
- Neverness series by David Zindell
  - namely, Neverness, The Broken God, The Wild and War in Heaven
- The New Atlantis by Sir Francis Bacon
- News from Nowhere by William Morris
- Next by Michael Crichton
- Nightfall by Isaac Asimov & Robert Silverberg
- Nineteen Eighty-Four by George Orwell
- Night Lamp by Jack Vance
- Night of Light by Philip José Farmer
- Nightwings by Robert Silverberg
- Ninth Step Station, created by Malka Older
- The Nome Trilogy by Terry Pratchett
  - namely, Truckers, Diggers and Wings
- Non-Stop by Brian Aldiss
- Norstrilia by Cordwainer Smith
- Noughts & Crosses series by Malorie Blackman
- Nova by Samuel R. Delany
- Nova Swing by M. John Harrison
- Null-A Three by A. E. van Vogt

== O ==
- Observer by Robert Lanza and Nancy Kress
- Odd John by Olaf Stapledon
- Oh. My. Gods. by Tera Lynn Childs
- The Old Lie by Claire G. Coleman
- Old Man's War by John Scalzi
- Omega by Jack McDevitt
- On My Way to Paradise by Dave Wolverton
- On the Beach by Nevil Shute
- On the Silver Globe by Jerzy Żuławski
- On Wings of Song by Thomas M. Disch
- One in Three Hundred by J. T. McIntosh
- One Million Tomorrows by Bob Shaw
- Operation Columbus by Hugh Walters
- The Ophiuchi Hotline by John Varley
- The Oppenheimer Alternative by Robert J. Sawyer
- Optiman by Brian Stableford
- Orbit unlimited by Poul Anderson
- Oryx and Crake by Margaret Atwood.
- Otherland series by Tad Williams
  - namely, City of Golden Shadow, River of Blue Fire, Mountain of Black Glass and Sea of Silver Light
- Our Child of the Stars by Stephen Cox
- Our Child of Two Worlds by Stephen Cox
- Out of the Deeps (a.k.a. The Kraken Wakes) by John Wyndham
- Out of the Silent Planet by C. S. Lewis
- The Outlaws of Mars by Otis Adelbert Kline
- Outworlder by Lin Carter

== P ==
- Parable of the Sower by Octavia Butler
- Parable of the Talents by Octavia Butler
- Pastwatch: The Redemption of Christopher Columbus by Orson Scott Card
- Past Master by R. A. Lafferty
- Patternmaster by Octavia Butler
- The Patterns of Chaos by Colin Kapp
- Pavane by Keith Roberts
- The Pawns of Null-A also published as The Players of Null-A by A. E. van Vogt
- Pebble in the Sky by Isaac Asimov
- The People of the Wind by Poul Anderson
- Percy Jackson & the Olympians series by Rick Riordan
  - namely, The Lightning Thief, The Sea of Monsters, The Titan's Curse, The Battle of the Labyrinth and The Last Olympian
- Perdido Street Station by China Miéville
- Permanence by Karl Schroeder
- Permutation City by Greg Egan
- The Pixel Eye by Paul Levinson
- The Plague Forge by Jason M. Hough
- Plague Ship by Andre Norton
- A Planet for Texans by H. Beam Piper and John J. McGuire
- Planet of Adventure series by Jack Vance
  - namely, City of the Chasch (a.k.a. The Chasck), Servants of the Wanek (a.k.a. Servants of the Wankh, The Wankh), The Dirdir and The Pnume
- Planet of the Apes by Pierre Boulle
- Planet of Exile by Ursula K. Le Guin
- Planet of Light by Raymond F. Jones (the sequel to Son of the Stars)
- The Player of Games by Iain M. Banks
- Player Piano by Kurt Vonnegut
- The Plot To Save Socrates by Paul Levinson
- Podkayne of Mars by Robert A. Heinlein
- Polaris by Jack McDevitt
- Ports of Call series by Jack Vance
  - namely, Ports of Call and Lurulu
- The Positronic Man by Isaac Asimov
- The Postman by David Brin
- Postmarked the Stars by Andre Norton
- The Prefect by Alastair Reynolds
- The Prestige by Christopher Priest
- Prey by Michael Crichton
- Prisoners of Power by Arkady and Boris Strugatsky
- Project Hail Mary by Andy Weir
- A Prophetic Romance by John McCoy
- Protector by Larry Niven
- The Protector's War by S. M. Stirling
- Proxima by Stephen Baxter
- Psion series by Joan D. Vinge
- The Puppet Masters by Robert Heinlein
- Purgatory Mount by Adam Roberts
- The Purloined Planet by Lin Carter
- Pushing Ice by Alastair Reynolds
- The Puzzle Planet by Robert A. W. Lowndes

== Q ==
- Quarantine by Greg Egan
- Queen of Angels (novel) by Greg Bear
- Quest Crosstime by Andre Norton
- Quest for the Future by A. E. van Vogt
- The Quiet War by Paul McAuley
- Quietus by Tristan Palmgren
- Quinzinzinzili by Régis Messac (French page on Messac)

== R ==
- R.U.R. (Rossum's Universal Robots) by Karel Čapek
- Radix Tetrad series by A. A. Attanasio
  - namely, Radix, In Other Worlds, Arc of the Dream and The Last Legends of Earth
- Rama Revealed by Arthur C. Clarke and Gentry Lee
- Rappaccini's Daughter by Nathaniel Hawthorne
- Ready Player One and Ready Player Two by Ernest Cline
- Red by Ted Dekker
- Red Planet by Robert A. Heinlein
- Red Thunder by John Varley
- Redemption Ark by Alastair Reynolds
- Remembrance of Earth's Past trilogy by Liu Cixin
  - namely The Three-Body Problem, The Dark Forest, Death's End
- Rendezvous with Rama by Arthur C. Clarke
- Renegade of Callisto by Lin Carter
- Report on Probability A by Brian W. Aldiss
- Return from the Stars by Stanisław Lem.
- Revelation Space by Alastair Reynolds
- Revolt on Alpha C by Robert Silverberg
- Ringworld by Larry Niven
  - also The Ringworld Engineers, The Ringworld Throne, Ringworld's Children
- The Rise of Renegade X by Chelsea M. Campbell
- Rite of Passage by Alexei Panshin
- Roadmarks by Roger Zelazny
- Roadside Picnic by Arkady and Boris Strugatsky
- The Roar by Emma Clayton
- Robopocalypse by Daniel H. Wilson
- Robots of Dawn by Isaac Asimov
- Rocannon's World by Ursula K. Le Guin
- Rocheworld by Robert Forward
- Rocket Jockey by Philip St. John
- Rocket to Limbo by Alan E. Nourse
- Rocket to Luna by Richard Marsten
- Rocketship Galileo by Robert A. Heinlein
- Roderick and Roderick at Random by John Sladek
- The Rolling Stones by Robert A. Heinlein
- Rosewater series by Tade Thompson
- Rule 34 by Charles Stross

== S ==
- Samaria series by Sharon Shinn
  - namely, Archangel, Jovah's Angel, The Alleluia Files and Angelica
- The Sands of Mars by Arthur C. Clarke
- Santiago by Mike Resnick
- Saraband of Lost Time by Richard Grant
- Sargasso of Space by Andre Norton
- Saturn's Children by Charles Stross
- Saucerers and Gondoliers by Dominic Green
- A Scanner Darkly, by Philip K. Dick
- The Scar by China Miéville (arguably fantasy)
- Schismatrix, by Bruce Sterling
- The Scourge of God by S. M. Stirling
- A Scourge of Screamers by Daniel F. Galouye
- Search the Sky by Cyril M. Kornbluth and Frederik Pohl
- The Secret of the Martian Moons by Donald A. Wollheim
- The Secret of the Ninth Planet by Donald A. Wollheim
- The Secret of Saturn's Rings by Donald A. Wollheim
- Semper Mars by Ian Douglas
- Sentinels From Space by Eric Frank Russell
- Serpent's Reach by C. J. Cherryh
- Seveneves by Neal Stephenson
- Shade's Children, by Garth Nix
- Shadrach in the Furnace by Robert Silverberg
- The Shape of Things to Come, by H. G. Wells
- The Sharing of Flesh by Anderson
- The Shibboleth by John Hornor Jacobs
- The Ship Who Sang by Anne McCaffrey
- The Shockwave Rider by John Brunner
- Side Show by Sheri S. Tepper
- Signal, by Cynthia DeFelice
- Signs of Life by M. John Harrison
- The Silk Code by Paul Levinson
- The Silkie by A. E. van Vogt
- The Simulacra by Philip K. Dick
- Simulacron-3 by Daniel F. Galouye
- Sinister Barrier by Eric Frank Russell
- The Sirens of Titan by Kurt Vonnegut
- Six Gates from Limbo by J. T. McIntosh
- Six Wakes by Mur Lafferty
- Sixth Column by Robert A. Heinlein
- The Sky People by S. M. Stirling
- Sky Pirates of Callisto by Lin Carter
- Skyship Academy: The Pearl Wars by Nick James
- Skyward series (Skyward, Starsight, Cytonic, Defiant) by Brandon Sanderson
- Slan by A. E. van Vogt
- Slaughterhouse-Five by Kurt Vonnegut
- Slaves of the Klau (a.k.a. Gold and Iron) by Jack Vance
- Slow Lightning by Jack McDevitt. Released as Infinity Beach in the United States.
- Snow Crash by Neal Stephenson
- The Snow Queen by Joan D. Vinge
- The Solar Wind (Aurinkotuuli) by Kullervo Kukkasjärvi
- Solaris by Stanisław Lem
- Solitaire by Kelley Eskridge
- Something Wicked This Way Comes by Ray Bradbury
- Somnium by Johannes Kepler
- Son of Man by Robert Silverberg
- Son of the Stars by Raymond F. Jones (the sequel is Planet of Light)
- Son of the Tree by Jack Vance
- The Song of Phaid the Gambler by Mick Farren
- The Songs of Distant Earth by Arthur C. Clarke
- Southern Reach series by Jeff VanderMeer
- Space Cadet by Robert A. Heinlein
- The Space Merchants by Frederik Pohl and C.M. Kornbluth
- The Space Odyssey by Arthur C. Clarke
- Space Opera by Jack Vance
- Space Trilogy series by C. S. Lewis
  - namely, Out of the Silent Planet, Perelandra (a.k.a. Voyage to Venus) and That Hideous Strength
- The Space Vampires by Colin Wilson
- Space Viking by H. Beam Piper
- Spaceship Medic by Harry Harrison
- Speaker for the Dead by Orson Scott Card
  - also Shadow of the Hegemon, Shadow Puppets, Shadow of the Giant, Shadows in Flight
- Sphere by Michael Crichton
- Spin by Robert Charles Wilson
- Stadium Beyond the Stars by Milton Lesser
- The Stainless Steel Rat by Harry Harrison
  - also The Stainless Steel Rat's Revenge, The Stainless Steel Rat Saves the World, The Stainless Steel Rat Wants You, The Stainless Steel Rat for President, A Stainless Steel Rat is Born, The Stainless Steel Rat Gets Drafted, The Stainless Steel Rat Sings the Blues, The Stainless Steel Rat Goes to Hell, The Stainless Steel Rat Joins the Circus
- Stalker by Boris and Arkady Strugatsky
- Stand on Zanzibar by John Brunner
- Star Born by Andre Norton (the sequel to The Stars Are Ours)
- The Star Conquerors by Ben Bova
- Star Gate by Andre Norton
- Star Guard by Andre Norton
- The Star Magicians by Lin Carter
- Star Maker by Olaf Stapledon
- Star Rangers by Andre Norton
- Star Rider by Doris Piserchia
- Star Rogue by Lin Carter
- Star Smashers of the Galaxy Rangers by Harry Harrison
- Star Surgeon by Alan E. Nourse
- Starman Jones by Robert A. Heinlein
- The Starmen by Leigh Brackett
- Starter Villain by John Scalzi
- The Stars Are Ours! by Andre Norton (the sequel is Star Born)
- The Stars, Like Dust by Isaac Asimov
- The Stars My Destination by Alfred Bester
- Starship Through Space by Lee Correy (nom de plume of G. Harry Stine)
- Starship Troopers by Robert A. Heinlein
- The State of the Art by Iain M. Banks
- State of Fear by Michael Crichton
- Station Eternity by Mur Lafferty
- The Status Civilization by Robert Sheckley
- The Steam Man of the Prairies by Edward S. Ellis
- Steel Beach by John Varley
- The Stepford Wives by Ira Levin
- The Steps of the Sun by Walter Tevis
- Stories of Your Life and Others by Ted Chiang
- Storm Over Warlock by Andre Norton
- Stranger in a Strange Land by Robert A. Heinlein
- Strata by Terry Pratchett
- Sultana's Dream (1905) by Begum Rokheya Sakhawat Hossain
- The Sunrise Lands by S. M. Stirling
- The Super Barbarians by John Brunner
- Supermind by A. E. van Vogt
- Surface Detail by Iain M. Banks
- Sword of Truth series by Terry Goodkind
  - Wizard's First Rule, Stone of Tears, Blood of the Fold, Temple of the Winds, Soul of the Fire, Faith of the Fallen, Pillars of Creation, Naked Empire, Chainfire, Phantom, Confessor, The Omen Machine, Debt of Bones, The First Confessor: The Legend of Magda Searus
- The Syndic by C. M. Kornbluth
- Synners by Pat Cadigan

== T ==
- Tactics of Mistake by Gordon R. Dickson
- A Tale of the Ragged Mountains by Edgar Allan Poe
- Tatja Grimm's World by Vernor Vinge
- Tau Zero by Poul Anderson
- Telzey Amberdon by James H. Schmitz
- Template by Matthew Hughes
- Terror by Satellite by Hugh Walters
- That Extraordinary Day by Predrag Vukadinović
- There Are Doors by Gene Wolfe
- They Shall Have Stars by James Blish
- The Thief of Thoth by Lin Carter
- This Immortal by Roger Zelazny
- This Island Earth by Raymond F. Jones
- This Perfect Day by Ira Levin
- Thorns by Robert Silverberg
- The Three Stigmata of Palmer Eldritch by Philip K. Dick
- Thrice Upon a Time by James P. Hogan
- Tik-Tok by John Sladek
- Time Enough for Love by Robert A. Heinlein
- Time for the Stars by Robert A. Heinlein
- The Time Machine by H. G. Wells
- The Time Traders by Andre Norton (the sequel is Galactic Derelict)
- Time War by Lin Carter
- Timelike Infinity by Stephen Baxter
- Timeline by Michael Crichton
- TimeRiders by Alex Scarrow
- Timescape by Gregory Benford
- Titan by Stephen Baxter
- Titan by John Varley
- To Die in Italbar by Roger Zelazny
- To Live Forever (a.k.a. Clarges) by Jack Vance
- To Sleep in a Sea of Stars by Christopher Paolini
- To Venus in Five Seconds by Fred T. Jane
- To Your Scattered Bodies Go by Philip José Farmer
- Too Like the Lightning by Ada Palmer
- Tower at the Edge of Time by Lin Carter
- Tower of Glass by Robert Silverberg
- Tower of the Medusa by Lin Carter
- A Transatlantic Tunnel, Hurrah! by Harry Harrison
- Transmigration by J. T. McIntosh
- Treason by Orson Scott Card
- The Tripods trilogy by John Christopher
- Trouble on Triton by Samuel R. Delany
- Trouble with Lichen by John Wyndham
- A True Story by Lucian
- The Truth Machine by James L. Halperin
- Tunnel in the Sky by Robert A. Heinlein
- The Twelve-Fingered Boy by John Hornor Jacobs
- Twenty Thousand Leagues Under the Seas by Jules Verne

== U ==
- Ubik by Philip K. Dick
- Uhura's Song by Janet Kagan
- Uglies series by Scott Westerfeld
  - namely, Uglies, Pretties, Specials and Extras
- Under Strange Suns by Ken Lizzi
- Under the Green Star by Lin Carter
- The Unicorn Girl by Michael Kurland
- The Universe Maker by A. E. van Vogt
- Hans Phaall: A Tale (also known as The Unparalleled Adventure of One Hans Pfaall) by Edgar Allan Poe
- Until the Last of Me by Sylvain Neuvel
- Unveiling a Parallel by Alice Ilgenfritz Jones & Ella Merchant
- Use of Weapons by Iain M. Banks

== V ==
- V-S Day by Allen Steele
- Valentine Pontifex by Robert Silverberg
- Valis by Philip K. Dick
- The Valley Where Time Stood Still by Lin Carter
- Vandals of the Void by Jack Vance
- Venus series by Edgar Rice Burroughs
  - namely, Pirates of Venus, Lost on Venus, Carson of Venus, Escape on Venus and The Wizard of Venus
- La Vermine du Lion by Francis Carsac
- Virtual Light by William Gibson
- The Void Captain's Tale by Norman Spinrad
- Voodoo Planet by Andre Norton
- The Vorkosigan Saga series of books by Lois McMaster Bujold
  - namely, Falling Free, Shards of Honor, Barrayar, The Warrior's Apprentice, The Vor Game, Cetaganda, Ethan of Athos, Brothers in Arms, Mirror Dance, Memory, Komarr, A Civil Campaign, Diplomatic Immunity
- Voyage by Stephen Baxter
- Voyage from Yesteryear by James P. Hogan
- The Voyage of the Space Beagle by A. E. van Vogt
- A Voyage to Arcturus by David Lindsay
- Voyage to the Bottom of the Sea by Theodore Sturgeon
- Voyager in Night by C. J. Cherryh
- Voyagers by Meg Charlton
- Vulcan's Hammer by Philip K. Dick
- Vurt by Jeff Noon

== W ==
- The Wailing Asteroid by Murray Leinster
- The Wall Around Eden by Joan Slonczewski
- War Against the Chtorr by David Gerrold
- The War Against the Rull by A. E. van Vogt
- War Girls by Tochi Onyebuchi
- The War of the Worlds by H. G. Wells
- War With the Newts (dystopian satire) by Karel Čapek
- The Warlock in Spite of Himself by Christopher Stasheff
- Wasp by Eric Frank Russell
- Watchmen graphic novel by Alan Moore and illustrated by Dave Gibbons
- Wave Without a Shore by C. J. Cherryh
- Way Station by Clifford D. Simak
- We by Yevgeny Zamyatin
- The Weapon Makers by A. E. van Vogt
- The Weapon Shops of Isher by A. E. van Vogt
- What Mad Universe by Fredric Brown
- When Gravity Fails by George Alec Effinger
- When the Green Star Calls by Lin Carter
- When Harlie Was One by David Gerrold
- When the Moon Hits Your Eye by John Scalzi
- The Whenabouts of Burr by Michael Kurland
- The Whisper by Emma Clayton
- White by Ted Dekker
- Who Fears Death by Nnedi Okorafor
- Wildseed by Octavia Butler
- The Wind from Nowhere by J. G. Ballard
- The Windup Girl by Paolo Bacigalupi
- The Wizard of Linn by A. E. van Vogt
- Wolfbane by Frederik Pohl and C. M. Kornbluth
- Woman On the Edge of Time by Marge Piercy
- The World and Thorinn by Damon Knight
- The World Menders by Lloyd Biggle Jr.
- The World of Null-A by A. E. van Vogt
- The World of Ptavvs by Larry Niven
- A World Out of Time by Larry Niven
- World War Z by Max Brooks
- Worm by John McCrae
- A Wrinkle in Time by Madeleine L'Engle

== X ==
- Xenocide by Orson Scott Card

== Y ==
- The Year of the Quiet Sun by Wilson Tucker
- The Years of Rice and Salt by Kim Stanley Robinson
- The Year When Stardust Fell by Raymond F. Jones
- Year Zero, by Robert Reid
- Ylana of Callisto by Lin Carter

== Z ==
- The Zap Gun by Philip K. Dick
- Zulu Heart by Steven Barnes

== See also ==
- List of alternate history fiction
- List of cyberpunk works
- List of fantasy authors
- List of fantasy novels
- List of fantasy story collections
- List of science fiction authors
- List of science fiction short stories
- List of Star Trek novels
- List of Star Wars books
- List of steampunk works
- List of time travel science fiction
