= The Shibboleth =

Paranormal novel

- First edition
- Author: John Hornor Jacobs
- Language: English
- Genre: Young Adult novel
- Published: 2014 (Carolrhoda Lab)
- Publication place: USA
- Media type: Print (paperback)
- Pages: 393
- ISBN: 9780761390084
- OCLC: 835951288
- Preceded by: The Twelve-Fingered Boy
- Followed by: The Conformity

The Shibboleth is a 2014 young adult's novel by John Hornor Jacobs. It continues the story of teenagers, Shreve Cannon, and Jack Graves, who have psychic abilities.

== Reception ==
A starred review in Booklist called it a "dyed-in-the-wool middle book [in a trilogy]", and said that "its chief achievement is to foment excitement for the finale", while Kirkus Reviews described it as "a series of elongated plot twists that need to move [the] lead character from one place to the next".

School Library Journal lauded its "engaging" prose, its "realistic, mature language" and its "cliff-hanger ending", while Horn Book Guides noted its "sheer weirdness" that "will captivate readers", and Voice of Youth Advocates praised it as "a superb telling of what it means to be different".
