= The Roar =

The Roar may refer to:

- The Roar (novel), 2008 children's novel
- The Roar (website), Australian sports website
