= The Dire Earth Cycle =

Science fiction novel trilogy

- Cover for book one
- The Darwin Elevator; The Exodus Towers; The Plague Forge
- Author: Jason M. Hough
- Country: United States
- Language: English
- Genre: Science-fiction
- Publisher: Del Rey Books (United States); Titan Books (United Kingdom)
- Published: July 2013 – September 2013
- Media type: Print, ebook, audiobook
- No. of books: 3

The Dire Earth Cycle is a trilogy of science fiction novels written by American author Jason M. Hough. The series was simultaneously released in both the United States (by Del Rey Books) and the United Kingdom (by Titan Books). The first book in the series, The Darwin Elevator, was released in July 2013, and the two sequels, The Exodus Towers and The Plague Forge, were released later that same year. An eBook-only release, The Dire Earth: A Novella, acts as a prequel to the trilogy and reveals more of the main characters' backgrounds.

Reception for The Darwin Elevator was extremely positive, and the book placed on The New York Times Best-Seller list.

== Background ==
The series is based on a future post-apocalyptic Earth in the 23rd century. An empty space vessel arrives which harbingers additional arrivals; the next is a ship which constructs the cord of a space elevator anchored in Darwin, Australia. The unknown aliens are never seen and are dubbed "The Builders". Neil Platz, having discovered the first vessel in orbit, works out the future location of the elevator and establishes Platz Industries to exploit it: buying the land where it will anchor, building the Nightcliff elevator base and climber infrastructure in Darwin, and eventually establishing orbital colonies along the elevator cord. For a time, Darwin thrives as the centre of space technology innovation.

== Synopsis ==
=== The Darwin Elevator ===
The first novel is set years after most of the Earth's population has died from a quickly spreading plague called "SUBS". Those who survive the disease turn into zombie-like subhumans. The others comprise the rare "immunes" and the refugees inhabiting the "Aura" safe zone around the space elevator.

Humanity exists as refugees in Darwin or as technological space dwellers, who occupy space stations and space farms constructed around the elevator. They live in a fragile coexistence: Darwin exports air and water for the space stations, and the space farms feed the ground population.

The lead character, Captain Skyler Luiken, heads a team of fellow immune scavengers, who can survive outside the Aura, battling subhumans while they collect items of value for trade or to repair the aging elevator complex and space stations. Skyler and his crew become entangled in the political plots and power games of Russell Blackfield, the head of the Nightcliff elevator base, and Neil Platz, creator and "owner" of the space stations. As the Aura's protection begins to fail, Platz and scientist Dr. Tania Sharma discover that another Builder vessel is due to arrive.

Skyler eventually gets to the bottom of the Aura's failure but is unable to stop Blackfield from assaulting the space facilities. The novel ends in a cliffhanger: as the Builders have established another space elevator in South America, the characters escape from the Nightcliff coup by relocating some space stations to the new elevator, where they find things are very different.

=== The Exodus Towers ===
Skyler and Tania have managed to build a colony around the new space elevator in Brazil, but things are far from over. They are soon attacked by a group of soldiers who are also immune to the plague and bent on taking over. Things are made worse by the existence of a new group of plague-infected humans who are enhanced by strange alien technology and by the presence of a religious cult back in Darwin, Australia.

=== The Plague Forge ===
In the third book Skyler must try to find a set of strange keys left behind by the aliens, all of which are spread throughout the world. In Africa, Skyler manages to find several strange artifacts as well as many humans warped by the plague. Throughout this Skyler continues to question: what is the purpose of the aliens, and why they have done all that they did?

== Development ==
Prior to writing the trilogy Hough was greatly influenced by Joss Whedon's television series Firefly; Hough had enjoyed the show during its limited run, and the show's cancellation made him to want to write books with a similar theme. Hough did not immediately begin writing the trilogy, as he felt "in novel form the genre had largely alienated all but the hard-SF reader". He began writing after reading John Scalzi's Old Man's War (2005), which he stated showed him that the literary genre still had potential. While writing Hough tried to create a world that was "equal parts The Stand and 2001" that would be accessible to all readers. He chose to set the trilogy in Darwin, Australia, since he "needed a location near the equator, because otherwise a space elevator doesn't work", and because the location had other aspects that appealed to him, such as the name's connotations and its melting pot-esque nature.

== Reception ==
Critical reception for The Darwin Elevator has been predominantly positive, with positive reviews from such outlets as SF Signal and Locus Online. Alan Cheuse praised the book and compared it positively to older books in the same genre, such as Arthur C. Clarke's The Fountains of Paradise. Tor.com also had praise for the novel and commented that, although the book did not fully live up to the blurb's promise of its being "a novel with the genes of a Firefly episode mixed with a John Scalzi novel", its action sequences and Hough's development of the "alien mystery and the story's rising stakes" were extremely entertaining.
