= One Million Tomorrows =

1970 novel by Bob Shaw

First book edition. Cover art by Leo and Diane Dillon.

One Million Tomorrows is a science fiction novel by British writer Bob Shaw, first published in 1970 in magazine form by the American magazine Amazing Stories. The paperback version is somewhat different, and was published the same year by Ace Books, as illustrated by Leo and Diane Dillon.

== Plot ==
In the 22nd century, no one has to die of old age any more. The pharmaceuticals division of a large corporation has devised a potion that bestows immortality on a single application, without any need for follow up treatments. The immortality treatment does not and cannot wear off. All it takes is a single dose, and the human will become immortal. However, it has an unusual effect on males that drink it. It effectively neuters them, causing complete cessation of sexual desire and the ability to perform sexually. In this kind of world, many men put off taking the immortality treatment for as long as possible.

However, the main character, Will Carewe, is not yet immortal, and wishes to involve his wife in questions as serious as this one. They have not yet had any children. He is a high ranking employee for a transnational corporation that one day approaches him with a confidential question relating to the discovery of an immortality potion that does the same thing that the current one does, but without the undesirable side-effect of turning off the sex drive in males. The desirability of patenting the process requires the corporation to handle related matters under a cloak of secrecy, but somewhere someone has spilled the beans; competitors will do anything for the magic recipe, especially if this can be done before the patent is filed in the US Patent Office. They will do anything, including bribery, extortion, and murder, to get the information out of the pharmaceuticals lab before the process is made public. The hero of the story, Will Carewe, says he is willing to test the new chemical, even if it backfires and results in permanent sterility and complete loss of physical desire and physical ability. But it appears there is someone out there who is willing to do anything to kill him before he does.

== See also ==
- List of science fiction novels
