= Skyward (novel) =

2018 young adult science fiction novel by Brandon Sanderson

- First edition (US)
- Author: Brandon Sanderson
- Cover artist: Charlie Bowater
- Language: English
- Series: Cytoverse
- Genre: Science fiction novel
- Publisher: Delacorte Press, Gollancz (UK)
- Publication date: November 6, 2018
- Pages: 528
- ISBN: 978-0-399-55577-0
- Preceded by: "Defending Elysium"
- Followed by: Starsight

Skyward is a 2018 young adult (Note: It is published as an adult novel in the UK.) science fiction novel written by American author Brandon Sanderson. It is the first in a series of four books. It was published by Delacorte Press on November 6, 2018.

Skyward is set in the same universe as Sanderson's short story "Defending Elysium", which details events hundreds of years before the events of Skyward. "Defending Elysium" is available on Sanderson's website and contains spoilers for Skyward.

== Plot ==
Spensa (Spin) is a 17-year-old girl who is part of a group of shipwrecked humans living on a ruined world called Detritus, under constant attack from mysterious aliens called the Krell. Spensa dreams of following in the footsteps of her deceased father, a fighter pilot of the Defiant Defense Force (DDF). However she is barred from any chance at becoming one because her father abandoned his flight in the infamous Battle of Alta, which ended in his own wingmates shooting him down.

In order to get accepted into the flight academy, she and her peers must take an exam to prove their worth. Spensa, who has been preparing for the exam her entire life, has high hopes to pass, as does her longtime friend Rodge. However, on the day of the testing, DDF Admiral Ironsides rigs the exam so that Spensa fails. Angry at her defeat, she surreptitiously retakes the exam after everyone has left. Cobb, her father's former wingmate and an instructor at the academy, spies on her and sees her near-perfect score, so he offers her the opportunity to come train under him.

At the academy, Spensa is introduced to her fellow cadet crew who, at Spensa's recommendation, name themselves the Skyward Flight. Their members are Spensa, Rodge, Kimmaly, Hurl, FM, Nedd, Arturo, Morningtide, Bim, and Jorgen (nicknamed Jerkface by Spensa). After training in a virtual reality simulator, they are suddenly called to the battlefield to aid against a Krell incursion. Rodge is left scared, and quits the flight academy to instead become an engineer. Spensa is barred from using academy facilities and quarters, so she occupies a nearby cave, where she discovers an advanced crashed ship with an artificial intelligence computer. Spensa, with the help of a cautious Rodge, begins to work on repairing the ship. In the meantime, Spensa and her cadet flight crew continue to learn and practice new techniques under the guidance of Cobb. Spensa begins to bond with her classmates.

Spensa is eventually able to power the ship, after stealing a power module from Jorgen's hover car, which introduces itself as M-Bot and explains that it was left in the cave by its former owner. However, M-Bot's memory banks are corrupted and it remembers little, beyond orders to lie low and not reveal itself to the public. Skyward Flight is called into action again, and Bim and Morningtide are killed in the subsequent battle. As they further their training, they are called upon more and more, but also lose numbers. Nedd quits after his brothers are killed in combat. Hurl crashes and dies, prompting Kimmalyn to also quit. Arturo is pulled by his worried parents.

Spensa, with Jorgen's help, cremates Hurl at her crash site and recovers the booster from Hurl's ship which Rodge uses to repair M-Bot's flying capabilities. She acquires a recording of the Battle of Alta, which reveals that her father did not desert, but rather turned on and attacked his fellow pilots. Cobb explains that his turning was the result of "the Defect", a mental power which is genetic. Spensa has occasional disturbing visions, which her father supposedly also saw. During her next battle, Spensa is shot down, and ejects in order to save her own life. Ironsides uses this "cowardice" as an excuse to remove Spensa from the academy.

On graduation day, Ironsides mobilizes all her pilots to battle the Krell for a valuable piece of fallen space salvage. While the pilots are distracted, a Krell bomber launches an attack from the opposite direction. Spensa uses a damaged fighter to assault the bomber, but is shot down again. She crashes, but Cobb brings M-Bot to her, and she uses its advanced capabilities to destroy the bomber and save the DDF. She travels with M-Bot into space, where her Defect allows her to hear and intercept Krell communications. She returns to the planet to report that the Krell are actually a coalition of aliens intent on keeping humans trapped on Detritus, though they are now actively trying to exterminate humanity.

== Reception ==
Skyward debuted on The New York Times Best Sellers list as number three in the Young Adult Hardcover category. Publishers Weekly praised the fearless heroine and memorable cast and liked how the cliffhanger ending sets up the next novel.

== Sequels ==
Starsight, the second novel, was released on November 26, 2019. Starsight follows Spensa as she continues investigating the mystery of the Krell and her defect. The third book titled Cytonic was released on November 23, 2021, while three novellas co-written by Janci Patterson titled Sunreach, ReDawn, and Evershore were released around the same time. Book 4, Defiant, the final installment in the series, was released on November 21, 2023.

== Television ==
Universal Television purchased the rights to the series in 2020.
