= That Extraordinary Day =

2012 novel by Predrag Vukadinović

- Author: Predrag Vukadinović
- Original title: Тај необичан дан; Taj neobičan dan
- Cover artist: drawings by Gustave Dore and Radovan M. Đurić; adapted by Mladen Joksić
- Language: Serbian
- Genre: Novel
- Publisher: Everest Media, Belgrade
- Publication date: 2012
- Publication place: Serbia
- Media type: Print (Paperback)
- Pages: 153
- ISBN: 978-86-7756-024-9

That Extraordinary Day (Serbian: Тај необичан дан / Taj neobičan dan) is a science fiction novel written by Predrag Vukadinović. The novel connects the theme of time travel with the Second Coming of Christ, using cosmological and religious concepts.

It was published as the 65th book in the Western Balkans science fiction and fantasy imprint "Znak Sagite" in 2012. It is Vukadinovic's debut novel.

== Plot summary ==
As the human race awaits the year 2101, Russian criminals break into a science facility and steal a time machine. They end up in the 1st century AD, in the Holy Land, becoming not only a part of the unknown years of Jesus, but a part of the Second Coming and the End Time.

== Critical reception ==
Slobodan Ivkov, critic of Belgrade's Blic daily evaluates the concept as "more than intriguing" and notes that "documentary inserts undoubtedly enrich this work".

Writer and critic Zoran Stefanović in a detailed essay pointed out that the connection of modern physics and Orthodox Christian eschatology is a novelty in Serbian pop-culture, especially in prose fiction. He also praised the narrative rhythm and tempo, despite some storytelling flaws.
