= Orbit Unlimited =

1961 science fiction novel by Poul Anderson

- First edition
- Author: Poul Anderson
- Cover artist: John Schoenherr
- Language: English
- Genre: Science fiction
- Published: 1961 (Pyramid)
- Publication place: United States
- Pages: 158
- OCLC: 16394808

Orbit Unlimited is a science fiction novel by American writer Poul Anderson, first published in 1961. Essentially a linked group of short stories, it recounts the colonisation of the planet Rustum, a fictional terrestrial world orbiting Epsilon Eridani, by a group of refugees from an authoritarian planet Earth bearing some resemblance to the historical Pilgrim Fathers. Although habitable, Rustum's atmospheric pressure is so great that only its mountains and high plateaus are suitable for human settlement. The novel, like much of Anderson's work, has a libertarian subtext as the colonists flee the oppression on their home planet.
