= After Doomsday =

1962 novel by Poul Anderson

- Lurid and misleading cover picture from original paperback printing.
- Author: Poul Anderson
- Cover artist: Ralph Brillhart
- Language: English
- Genre: Science fiction
- Publisher: Ballantine Books
- Publication date: 1962
- Publication place: United States
- Media type: Print (Paperback)
- Pages: 128

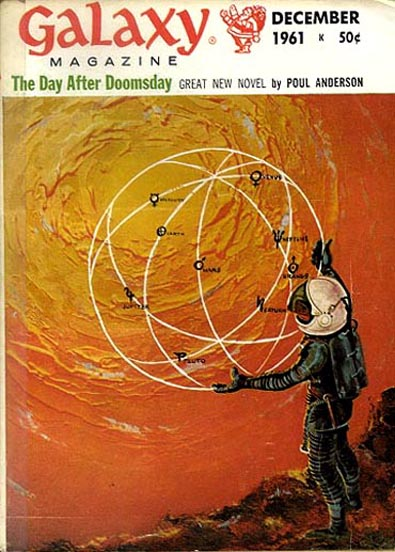
After Doomsday was serialized in Galaxy as The Day After Doomsday in 1961-62.

After Doomsday is a science fiction novel by American writer Poul Anderson. It was published as a complete novel in 1962, having been serialized as The Day after Doomsday in the magazine Galaxy, between December 1961 and February 1962.

== Plot introduction ==
The novel explores events after the destruction of Earth, from the point of view of two returning starship crews, one entirely made up of men, the other consisting entirely of women.

The story is set in the early 21st century. Even as the Cold War dragged on, Earth has been suddenly contacted by the Monwaingi space-faring culture. The technology of interstellar travel is spreading across the galaxy, disrupting one culture after another. Monwaing itself was contacted only a few centuries previously. Another culture, the Vorlak, underwent a transition from a stable planetary society to a warlord culture similar to the Japanese Shogunate. The nomadic Kandemirian culture became a hegemonistic one similar to the Mongol Empire. Earth found itself on the fringes of a conflict between Kandemir and a coalition led by Vorlak, with Monwaing on the sidelines, actively supporting the anti-Kandemir forces.

There is a lingua franca called Uru, which bonds the diverse cultures together. The original speakers of the language may have also initiated the spread of interstellar technology, but the language seems to have outlived, or at least outstripped its originators.

In the 20 years since contact, several expeditions have set out, some in borrowed ships, some in ships built on Earth. The ship USS Benjamin Franklin, with an all-male crew, set out to visit the core of the Milky Way — actually an unusual quest by the stodgy standards of the typical galactic culture. Another ship has gone as far as the Magellanic Clouds. The pan-European expedition in the ship Europa, crewed entirely by women, has roamed far outside the local group of cultures. The star-drive technology allows journeys of tens of thousands of parsecs in mere months. In spite of this, most cultures are "stay-at-homes" compared to humans, interacting only with the local group of cultures, known as a "cluster".

Now the Franklin and the Europa return to find that Earth has suffered the ultimate disaster.

== Plot summary ==
=== Ragnarok ===
The USS Benjamin Franklin, a starship crewed entirely by men returns to Earth, to find the planet consumed by eruptions from within the crust. All life is gone, along with the few outposts of humanity on the Moon and artificial satellites. Missiles lurk throughout the Solar System, ready to destroy returning ships. Unable to leave a message drone because of the missiles, Franklin flees to Tau Ceti. Discipline breaks down, the captain is killed, and a nucleus of a new crew forms behind a man named Carl Donnan. Donnan is an engineer and adventurer who gave up wandering the Earth for a chance to see the galaxy, courtesy of a Senator who owed him a favor. Now he is leading almost 300 men on a quest for other humans, and for Earth's murderers. Chief suspects are the Kandemirians, especially since the missiles swarming through the Solar System are Kandemirian.

Earth is new to interstellar trade, and a handful of ships have gone out into the wider galactic society. The men realize they have little hope of finding other humans, let alone women. They do have a guide with them, an alien called Ramri from the polycultural society originating on the planet Monwaing. Ramri is a biped descended from feathered, bird-like creatures.

Some time afterwards, the ship Europa with a crew of 100 women returns, to find Earth destroyed and missiles roaming the Solar System. They are able to disable one missile. A small team boards the missile, including Navigation Officer Sigrid Holmen and her friend Gunnery Officer Alexandra Vukovic. The missile appears to have been manufactured by Kandemirians, although there are symbols in an unknown script scrawled on a bulkhead within it. Other missiles approach, and the Europa must leave without addressing the central mystery. The officers confer about where to go next.

=== The Quests ===
Travelling to Vorlak, Donnan sells the crew's services to the warlord, or Draga, Hlott Luurs. His proposition is that the humans will develop new technology allowing a ship to detect the drives of other ships far beyond the usual range. Donnan's friend Arnold Goldspring is a mathematician who has a host of new ideas for the technology. The detector is just the first one. To prove its worth, Donnan bargains for a Vorlak ship which they will use on a stealth raid on a Kandemirian outpost.

The raid is a disaster, and they are captured by Kandemirians. Interrogated by the head of the Kandemirian forces, Tarkamat, Donnan is told that if he refuses to re-create the technology for Kandemir, his crew will die horribly, one by one. He has no choice but to comply.

The crew of the Europa travel far beyond the boundaries of the local cluster to one with a vibrant capitalist economy. At Sigrid Holmen's suggestion, they set themselves up as "Terran Traders Inc." and proceed to amass wealth, hoping to be able to buy or charter ships to search for survivors of Earth. Sigrid is kidnapped by representatives of a rival trader culture, the Forsi, who resemble heavyset gnomes. The Forsi want to take her away to study, determined to discover why "Terran Traders Inc." is able to be so successful. She is in the process of attempting escape from them when Alexandra Vukovic, a former urban guerrilla, tracks her down and uses her skills to eliminate Sigrid's captors.

=== Earth's suicide? ===
Donnan's crew, laboring on one of the Kandemirians' subject planets, are being carefully monitored to make sure they only work on the drive detection device. However, the monitoring of the material making up the chassis of the device is less stringent, and they are able to create a dummy copy of a common soldier's rifle from seemingly unrelated parts. With this they bluff their way out of confinement, capture real weapons, and eventually steal a starship. The price of this escape is the loss of a suicide squad who hold off the local troops long enough for Donnan, Goldspring, Ramri and the rest to take off.

Ramri takes them to his homeworld, Katkinu. Like many Monwaing worlds, this has different and apparently incompatible cultures living side by side. The official Representative of the homeworld on Katkinu is from the Laothaung culture. Unlike Ramri's culture, this one uses biotechnology efficiently and ruthlessly. Specialized lifeforms, designed to have just enough intelligence to do work, and subservient to the rulers, carry out all labor. There are even altered types of Monwaingi being used as slaves. In the Representative's office they are shown a recording of an interrogation of an agent of the merchant culture of Xo. It indicates that Earth was destroyed by bombs sold to two of the minor national powers, and set up as a suicide weapon, to be detonated if either power was attacked with nuclear weapons.

=== The Battle of Brandobar ===
The men are shocked, but are still determined to fight on against the Kandemirians. Returning to Vorlak, Donnan bluffs his way past Hlott Luurs, who is still angry over the loss of a ship and his kinsman aboard it. Goldspring has designed more weapons using the stardrive technology. The basis of the drive is that space is a standing wave pattern. Where interference fringes occur, there is in effect no space and no distance. A ship may jump from fringe to fringe and travel from star to star in a short time. The new devices manufacture artificial fringes. With this they are able to distort space-time inside enemy ships, disabling missiles, inducing small thermonuclear explosions, and producing coherent sound waves. This last weapon lets them administer the coup de grâce to the Kandemirian fleet, broadcasting a message which demoralizes the crews, at the same time encouraging the subject races in the Empire to revolt.

After the victory, the news, in the form of a carefully crafted minstrel song, spreads around the galaxy. The song, in Uru, has the title "The Battle of Brandobar", and describes the final battle in a series of quatrains. A chapter of the novel is dedicated to a scholarly analysis of the song, teasing out both the story of the song and the calculated structure of the verses, designed to resist alteration as the song spreads from one singer to another along the trade routes.

It is through this song that the crew of the Europa, via their trade connections, learn where the USS Benjamin Franklin went.

=== Reunion — and the awful truth ===
Once the two crews are united, apart from the obvious considerations, they must decide who destroyed the Earth. The men still believe it was the Kandemirians, with the trader story being disinformation. When they decode the symbols the women found, they realize the truth. It is a base 12 to 6 conversion table to help technicians reprogram the weapons. The missiles are Kandemirian, but the script is Monwaingi. One of the many different Monwaingi societies, possibly the ruthless biotech Laothaung culture, wanted the Earth and saw fit to cleanse it before colonizing with their own biota. Ramri leaves for his home planet, determined to purge the culture that committed the crime, but aware that his own world might well be destroyed in the process. Carl Donnan and Sigrid Holmen can only look at each other and say "What have we done?"

== Characters ==
- Carl Donnan
- Ramri, a 5-foot-tall (1.5 m) bird-descended biped with brilliant blue feathers. He is a product of the high-technology Tantha culture who believe in trade with other cultures. As a Monwaingi representative on Earth, he is enraptured by human culture and its arts. He is particularly taken by human music, especially Beethoven. Despite his size and a somewhat delicate appearance, he is a willing fighter, and wields talons on his clawed feet.
- Arnold Goldspring, the Detector Officer on the USS Benjamin Franklin. A mathematician, he is able to re-invent the "paragravitic standing wave" technology behind interstellar travel to create new and revolutionary weapons.
- Sigrid Holmen, the Navigation Officer on the Europa. Tall, blonde, and Swedish, she is a stoic figure who has to control her grief over the loss of her beloved country, its forests, waters and people, and keep going forward in the hope that humanity might continue.
- Alexandra Vukovic, the Gunnery Officer on the Europa and Sigrid's best friend. She is a Serb and a graduate of "the Soviet incursion of 1995". This event turned her into a guerilla, a staunch friend, and a habitual rebel.
- Hlott Luurs, a Draga or warlord of the Vorlak, a race of bipeds of about the same size as humans, but resembling otters in the head shape and in the possession of a coat of fur. Hlott Luurs is the head of the Draga Council by virtue of support from a coalition of other Draga. Like the other Draga he is pugnacious, proud, quick to take offense, but bound by a code of honor, which Donnan uses to his advantage.
- Tarkamat of Kandemir, the military leader for the entire campaign against the Vorlak-led forces. After Donnan and his raiders are captured, he personally interrogates Donnan in his luxurious quarters. Like all Kandemirians, Tarkamat is well over 2 meters tall, handsome by human standards, a broad-shouldered and narrow-waisted biped with a ruff of hair framing the face. His officers and other soldiers are also members of his clan, a typical Kandmirian arrangement.
