= Matt Hill (writer) =

British writer

- Born: Matt Hill; 1984 (age 41–42); Tameside, Manchester, England
- Education: Cardiff University
- Occupations: Writer; copywriter
- Writing career
- Pen name: M. T. Hill
- Period: 2013–present
- Genres: Science fiction; dystopian fiction; horror fiction
- Website: mthill.co.uk

Matt Hill (born 1984) is an English science fiction and horror writer from Tameside in Manchester, England. He also writes using the pen name M. T. Hill. Hill received a degree in journalism at Cardiff University and currently lives in London where he writes and freelances as a copywriter. He has written five novels and several short stories. Hill's novels The Folded Man and Graft were finalist for the 2014 Dundee International Book Prize, and the 2017 Philip K. Dick Award, respectively.

Hill's novels portrays a dystopian and decaying England set in the near future. British speculative fiction author Nina Allan called Hill "one of the most innovative and outspoken new writers of British science fiction currently on the scene."

== Bibliography ==
=== Novels ===
- The Folded Man (Sandstone Press, 2013)
- Graft (Angry Robot, 2016)
- Zero Bomb (Titan, Books, 2019) – as M. T. Hill
- The Breach (Titan Books, 2020) – as M. T. Hill
- Lamb (Dead Ink, 2023)
- Wrecks (Dead Ink, 2026)

=== Short fiction ===
- "Eighty-niner" (Seat 14C, June 2017)
- "The Gridge" (New Worlds, January 2022) – as M. T. Hill
