= Cytonic =

2021 young adult Brandon Sanderson novel

- First edition (US)
- Author: Brandon Sanderson
- Cover artist: Charlie Bowater
- Language: English
- Series: Cytoverse
- Genre: Science fiction novel
- Publisher: Delacorte Press
- Publication date: November 23, 2021
- Pages: 432
- ISBN: 9780593433874
- Preceded by: Starsight
- Followed by: Defiant

Cytonic is a 2021 young adult (Note: As with the first two novels in the series, it is published as adult outside the US.) science fiction novel written by American author Brandon Sanderson. It is the third book in the Skyward series after Skyward and Starsight. The penultimate novel of the four-book series, it was published by Delacorte Press on November 23, 2021. A sequel was released in 2023 entitled Defiant.

== Plot ==
After entering a portal into the Nowhere, Spensa had come into contact with a choice to enter the Nowhere or return to her home. She chooses to enter the Nowhere, believing as she is that she cannot give her friends the advantage they need over the Superiority. Spensa emerges at the edge of the Nowhere where it crosses over into her universe, the "somewhere", and finds that many areas of land called "fragments" surround the center of the Nowhere, which is a luminous sun called the lightburst. She quickly gains the help of Chet Starfinder, a human explorer who has been in the Nowhere for 170 years, and deduces that he is actually Commander Spears, M-Bot's previous owner.

The Nowhere is occupied by rival pirate gangs controlling areas of fragments, and as Spensa, M-Bot, and Chet traverse different fragments containing diverse environments, they hope to cross through the pirate lands into No Man's Land, the area surrounding the lightburst. Spensa, who was told to follow the "Path of Elders" by her delver ally, journeys with Chet to find different portal stones placed throughout fragments. Through the first few portals, she and Chet learn through memories that being cytonic was actually a mutation caused by the Nowhere and Somewhere overlapping, and that the fragments were formed as a result of this overlap. They witness various species conversing with one another throughout time by entering the Nowhere, which was what allowed humans to visit other species and eventually led to the human wars.

While she sleeps, Spensa can commune with Jorgen and eavesdrop on Winzik and Brade, who she finds successfully making a deal with the delvers to assert the Superiority's authority in exchange for killing all the cytonics.

Spensa begins to lose her memory and sense of time as a result of being in the Nowhere and only remembers her identity because she has an "icon" resembling her father's pin and memory dust. She is caught trying to steal a ship by the Broadsiders pirate organization and becomes one of their members. Spensa fights a mysterious figure from the Cannonade faction, a rival pirate gang, and becomes the pirate champion. She also discovers that the Cannonade's representative is actually Hesho, who has completely lost his memory.

The delvers attack Spensa by inhabiting the minds of beings unable to resist their control and sending destroyed buildings through the Nowhere, but she manages to evade them and leads the pirates to Surehold, the superiority center for mining acclivity stone. There, she and Chet view a memory of Jason Write, the first human to discover he was cytonic and learn that the secrets of the delvers can be found in the lightburst. Spensa is faced with a choice to stay with the pirates and keep the delvers' attention or help her friends on Detritus, and ultimately chooses to return home. She, Chet, M-Bot and Hesho fly towards the lightburst while the delvers try to stop them from discovering the final memory and using the portal to escape the Nowhere.

Chet reveals that he is actually the delver Spensa reformed, and distracts the delvers, allowing Spensa to escape. They also view the final memory, which reveals that delvers are actually a form of artificial intelligence that duplicated themselves an infinite number of times to form monstrous beings, all to repress strong emotions at seeing Write and other humans they loved die. M-Bot sacrifices himself to the delvers, which gives Spensa the final boost to leave the Nowhere. Chet merges with Spensa, and she gains his memories. Doomslug, who can change her shape, is revealed to be Spensa's icon who was surreptitiously helping her all along.

With Doomslug's help, Spensa finally teleports to Detritus with Hesho only to find Jorgen as the new Admiral of the DDF and Detritus revolving around another planet.

== Characters ==
Call signs are denoted in parentheses.

- Spensa Nightshade (Spin): A skilled DDF pilot with cytonic powers, which allow her to access a dimension she refers to as the Nowhere in addition to allowing her to tap into other psionic uses. Previously posed as the alien Alanik using holographic technology forged by M-Bot.
- M-Bot: Spensa's advanced AI of unknown origin. He is highly talkative and frequently ponders whether he is truly alive or not. Originally housed in a starship, M-Bot's ship was deconstructed for parts and he is now located in a small drone.
- Chet Starfinder: A delver who was reformed after coming into contact with Spensa. He disguises himself as an explorer who has lost his memory due to spending 170 years in Nowhere.
- Doomslug: Spensa's pet alien slug who was revealed to be a source of faster-than-light travel and a fellow cytonic.

== Development ==
The novel was originally intended to be released in spring 2021 as part of a trilogy and later a four-book series. However, its release was delayed due to the COVID-19 pandemic and was rescheduled for November or December due to paper shortages and printing delays from the publisher. Sanderson originally explored the idea of having multiple points of view, an idea that was seemingly scrapped sometime during the writing process. In January 2021, Sanderson finished the first draft. Sanderson has stated that he feels the novel is a "little bit of a diversion" from the main story set to focus specifically on Spensa's arc in the aftermath of Starsight's last chapter.

== Reception ==
Kirkus Reviews was critical of pacing caused by the increased focus on character development but praised the "wild aerial dogfights and larger battles", "terrific combat scenes" and "galleries of the multispecies cast members."

== Tie-ins ==
Sanderson and Janci Patterson released three tie-in novellas called Sunreach, ReDawn, and Evershore in September, October, and December of 2021 respectively. The stories followed characters on Detritus—FM, Alanik, and Jorgen—while Spensa was in the Nowhere. These stories were also released as audiobooks at the same time.
