= Genesis Alpha =

2007 novel by Rune Michaels

- First edition
- Author: Rune Michaels
- Language: English
- Genre: Young adult novel, Science fiction
- Publisher: Simon & Schuster
- Publication date: 2007
- Publication place: United States
- Media type: Print (Hardcover and Paperback)
- Pages: 208
- ISBN: 1-4169-1886-8 (first edition, hardcover)
- OCLC: 85017897
- LC Class: PZ7.M51835 Gen 2007

Genesis Alpha is a young adult and science fiction novel by Icelandic author Rune Michaels, and was first published in 2007.

== Reception ==
Esther Keller in her review for Library Media Connection said "This book is primed with material for reluctant readers, but the clunky shifts of tenses at the start of the book may throw them off. Even so, it’s worth sticking with to discover the twists and turns." Frances Bradburn reviewing for Booklist called it a "fascinating, troubling thriller." Anthony C. Doyle reviewing for the School Library Journal did not recommend the novel saying "readers looking for a novel about a sibling's criminality would be better served by Patricia McCormick's My Brother's Keeper, and those looking for stories about tissue donation and sibling illness could try Jodi Picoult's My Sister's Keeper"
