= Eileen-Marie Duell Buchanan =

British author (1922 – 2010)

Eileen-Marie Duell Buchanan (15 November 1922 – 20 May 2010) was a British author who specialized in writing literature belonging to the mystery, suspense, or detective genre. She wrote over forty novels under a number of various pseudonyms, including Clare Curzon, Marie Duell and Rhona Petrie. She studied French and psychology at King's College in London.

== Bibliography ==
=== Stand-alone novels ===
- Thorne in the Flesh (1971)
- Anima (1972), a tale about a séance where a mysterious older woman (having the appearance of a remarkably younger woman) acts as a medium, inviting a traveling spirit to come and inhabit the body of a young woman who lives across the field of her childhood home, the manor of Greenshards, now a summer home. As the possession continues, the young woman loses track of where she has been, and what she has been doing.
- Unofficial Breath (1973), a tale about a woman who has a near death experience at the hospital when a doctor saves her life. But complications arise after suffering a concussion very shortly after the operation.
- The Dark Backward (1975), A young archaeologist pursues the source of his disaffection on an enigmatic dig.
- Morgana (1977), The story takes place during the 17th century in the court of James I where a loyal companion of Princess Elizabeth has visions, premonitions, and dreams that hint at an ominous heritage.
- Leaven of Malice (1979)
- Special Occasion (1981)
- The Face in the Stone (1989), Jean Mather's asthmatic husband died of natural causes in Cyprus. Only when an insurance investigator arrives from Athens to question her does she begin to wonder if his death was natural – and to realize that if not, she is the obvious suspect.
- Dead Giveaway (1995)

=== Marcus Maclurg mysteries ===
- Death in Deakins Wood (1963)
- Murder by Precedent (1964)
- Running Deep (1965)
- Dead Loss (1966)
- Maclurg Goes West (1968)

=== Dr. Nassim Pride mysteries ===
- Foreign Bodies (1967)
- Despatch of a Dove (1969)

=== Superintendent Mike Yeadings mysteries ===
- I Give You Five Days (1983)
- Masks and Faces (1984)
- The Trojan Hearse (1985)
- The Quest for K (1986)
- Three-Core Lead (1988)
- The Blue-Eyed Boy (1990)
- Cat’s Cradle (1991)
- First Wife, Twice Removed (1992)
- Death Prone (1992)
- Nice People (1993)
- Past Mischief (1995)
- Close Quarters (1996)
- All Unwary (1997)
- Cold Hands (1999)
- Don’t Leave Me (2001)
- The Body of a Woman (2002)
- A Meeting of Minds (2003)
- Last To Leave (2004)
- The Glass Wall (2005)
- The Edge (2007)
- Payback (2008)
- Off Track (2008)
- Burnt Out (2009)
- Devil in the Detail (2010)

=== Sian Vassilakis mysteries ===
- Trail of Fire (1987)
- Shot Bolt (1988)

=== Lucy Sedwick mysteries ===
- Guilty Knowledge (1999)
- The Colour of Blood (2000)
- Dangerous Practice (2002)
