= Hooded Swan =

Series of science fiction novels by Brian Stableford

The Hooded Swan series (or Star Pilot Grainger series) is a series of science fiction novels by Brian Stableford, published in the early 1970s, beginning with Halcyon Drift (1972). It consists of six books, which have also been collected in an omnibus entitled Swan Songs: The Complete Hooded Swan Collection (2001).

The series is set in the far future and possesses some of the features of space opera and planetary romance. It is narrated in the first person by the main character, Grainger, a well-known independent pilot. He is acerbic, sarcastic, and generally disagreeable on principle, attempting to keep himself isolated from others where possible. He serves as something as an unreliable narrator with respect to his own feelings and motivations.

To balance this out, Stableford uses the device of an alien symbiote, referred to as the wind, who is privy to all of Grainger's thoughts and wants to make him a better person. It also calls Grainger out on some of his self-deception.

Grainger is also privy to the wind's memories from times and places unknown to any other human - all of which he keeps to himself, though in several episodes it is clear that the information would have been highly appreciated by Grainger's employers.

Grainger is one of the few examples of a pacifist (in the pragmatic sense) lead character in science fiction, and is made all the more remarkable by the fact that he is something of an anti-hero.

== Plot introduction ==
The series is the story of star pilot Grainger, who is forced by circumstances, after his own ship is destroyed in a disastrous crash, to accept a job flying a new ship, the Hooded Swan, that is a fusion of human and alien technologies. She is faster and more manoeuvrable than any previous design, but despite the opportunity offered, Grainger resents the fact he is employed simply as a pilot but denied the position of captain, and cannot resign at any time during his two-year contract without dire financial penalties that he regards as thoroughly unjust. In fact Grainger regards his terms of employment as making him little more than a slave, or at least an indentured servant. However, left little alternative by his financial situation, Grainger takes the job, and carries out a variety of assignments for his new masters, accompanied by the unwelcome alien symbiote sharing his brain.

== Origins and influences ==
Brian Stableford has said that when he began writing Halcyon Drift he resolved that the series would embody an attitude towards violence closer to his own views than that of traditional action-adventure stories that he'd seen (and written) in the past. Grainger himself was meant to be a model of his own self-reconstruction.

== Major characters ==
- Grainger: Narrator, a well-known independent space pilot and trader, and expert in alien environments.
- The Wind: Alien mind symbiote sharing the mind, thoughts, and senses of Grainger.
- Titus Charlot: Leader of the team that designed of the Hooded Swan, and a scientist from New Alexandria.
- Nick delArco: Shipbuilder and captain of the Hooded Swan.
- Eve Lapthorn: Back-up pilot of the Hooded Swan and pilot of the Sister Swan. Sister of Grainger's dead partner and engineer Michael Lapthorn.
- Johnny Socoro: Initially back-up engineer of the Hooded Swan, promoted to primary engineer at the end of Halcyon Drift.
- Rothgar: First engineer of the Hooded Swan. He resigns at the end of Halcyon Drift, but later signs on as the engineer of the Sister Swan.
- Denton: A police officer on New Alexandria, employed by Charlot on the side. He and Grainger become friends.

== Ships ==
=== Engine types ===
Unlike a lot of science fiction, in the Hooded Swan universe there are multiple ways of travelling faster-than-light. Three are repeated regularly:

- Mass Relaxation: Through the use of a mass relaxation web, the ship neutralises the relativistic mass-gain as it approaches the lightspeed barrier and then makes a "tachyonic transfer" to accelerate beyond it. This is the method employed by the Hooded Swan and Sister Swan.
- P-Shifting: The details of this method aren't specified, but it is said that when it goes wrong, it goes wrong discreetly—they do not explode, they simply stop working. P-shifters are also unable to cope well with less than ideal conditions. The words "probability" and "phase" have both been used to expand the first letter.
- Dimensional Hopping: The details of this method aren't specified, but from the name it is possibly some variety of hyperspace.

=== Ships of note ===
- The Hooded Swan: The Hooded Swan is a creation of New Alexandria, a fusion of design principles from both human and Khormon sciences. It was built by Nick delArco, who also serves as the captain, under the direction of Titus Charlot and two other New Alexandrians. The Hooded Swan is the fastest starship known to exist, matched perhaps only by the Sister Swan (which has the same design). It can achieve speeds of fifty thousand times the speed of light in clear space, and can turn at twenty thousand, whereas most ships have difficulty turning at all. This is in large part due to the design of the ship, which is flexible and jointed; more like a bird than a traditional rocket or spaceship. Like most ships in this fictional universe, the Swan is piloted with the aid of a mind-machine interface. The Swan's interface, however, is more advanced than that of any other ship (save perhaps the Sister Swan), truly allowing the pilot to fly the ship as though it was an extension of his own body and to use the ship's sensors as though they were his own senses.
- The Sister Swan: A design similar to the Hooded Swan.
- Fire-Eater: The first ship owned by Grainger and Michael Lapthorn. An old and worn out dimension hopper that the partners used to trade around the rim of known space. Later they took a job retrieving alien knowledge and artifacts for the library on New Alexandria, because, in Grainger's words:

"There was better money, come by far more easily, in the core, and we needed to scrap the Fire-Eater before she fire-ate herself and us with her."

- Javelin: Grainger and Lapthorn's new trading ship, purchased with the money earned from their contract with the library. Another dimension hopper like most independent trading ships, it was damaged by spatial lesion near the edge of the Halcyon Drift. Grainger brought the ship down in a forced landing on the planet he later named Lapthorn's Grave after his engineer, who was killed when the ship's engine ruptured in the crash.

== Plot details ==
=== Halcyon Drift (1972) ===
The story begins with Grainger marooned alone on a desolate planet on the fringe of a notorious area of distorted space known as the Halcyon Drift. A drift lesion brought down his ship Javelin in a crash that killed his partner and engineer, Michael Lapthorn. Grainger has managed to survive for two years, but during his stay he has been invaded by an alien mind symbiote (although he considers it a parasite) which was similarly stranded on the planet when its previous host died there.

Grainger's distress signal is finally picked up by the Ella Marita, one of many ships searching for the Lost Star, a famous lost vessel hidden somewhere in the Halcyon Drift. The management of the Caradoc Company, the owner of the rescue vessel, feel they have wasted time and money following Grainger's signal instead of the one they were seeking, and so take him to court upon his return to civilization, and successfully levy a huge salvage fee against him and any of his future earnings.

Grainger returns to Earth to inform Lapthorn's family of what happened, and along the way encounters Johnny, the grandson of an old mentor, who is trying to get a job in space.

At Lapthorn's family residence, he also meets Michael Lapthorn's sister Eve, who suggests that she might be able to help him get a job. He rebuffs her offer a little rudely, but while staying with Johnny he is approached by Captain Nick delArco with an offer. He is wanted to fly a new ship, the fastest one ever built, on missions for the planet New Alexandria, for a period of two years. Once two years are up, they will pay off the balance of his debt.

Despite the generous terms, Grainger is suspicious, and almost balks when he learns that the first mission will be to go into the Halcyon Drift, in a completely untried ship, to recover the Lost Star. The wind helps to convince Grainger to take the job anyway. Johnny is hired as part of the deal.

Grainger learns that the man behind the project is someone he has worked for before, a scientist named Titus Charlot. Charlot has grand goals of uniting the galaxy through the sharing of knowledge. Grainger dismisses him as insane, although the wind appreciates his aims. Before they can leave, Grainger is the subject of an assassination attempt, but the source can not be proved.

On a world just outside the Drift, Grainger encounters an old friend, an alien (Khormon) trader named Alachakh. He is nearing the end of his life, and for personal reasons wants to find the Lost Star before he dies, but fears that the Hooded Swan will beat him to it. He proposes an arrangement with Grainger. He has acquired the location of the ship, and will lead the Hooded Swan to it. In exchange, Grainger would allow him one day with the ship and its cargo. After that, Grainger can have both the ship and the credit. Grainger agrees, despite that the Hooded Swan should be able to outrun Alachakh's ship, the Hymnia.

The Hooded Swan follows the Hymnia into the Drift but the trip is extremely dangerous. The Hymnia is damaged and stops moving, and Grainger insists on rendezvousing. On Hymnia he learns that the two on board were dead, and receives a message from Alachakh explaining why he wanted the Lost Star. It seems that the Khor-Monsa originated on another planet, called Myastrid, lost to history. As a matter of pride, the Khor-Monsa do not want anyone to know this, and have kept the secret even from most of their own population. It is believed the Lost Star visited Myastrid just before it crashed, and its cargo would contain evidence of Myastrid. Alachakh wants to destroy the evidence, to keep this one secret.

The Lost Star is located on a world in a particularly dangerous part of the Drift, and landing is too much for Grainger. He blacks out, and wakes to learn that the wind took control and landed the ship. The wind, who had always claimed that it could not force Grainger to do anything against his will, claims that this is still true, but admits that he can take over when Grainger has given up control. He insists he would only do so in an emergency or at Grainger's own request.

Grainger, delArco, and Johnny cross the planet in an armored vehicle, observing the strange biosphere that has evolved on the world, but there comes a point delArco and Grainger must proceed on foot. Grainger contrives to lose delArco and get to the ship first, intending to destroy the cargo, but when that fails, he manages to convince delArco of the righteousness of his goal without revealing the secret. The two destroy the cargo and tamper with the evidence, and claim that the Lost Star had no cargo.

On the way home, Caradoc ships attempt to destroy the Hooded Swan in an effort to prevent them from returning with the credit and glory of reaching the Lost Star, but Grainger's piloting manages to save the ship, and they escape. The Caradoc vessels fall victim to their own attack.

=== Rhapsody in Black (1973) ===
Grainger shuttles Charlot and some passengers to the planet Rhapsody, an isolated religious community constructed entirely below-ground on a world too close to the parent star, because something valuable has been discovered there, and Charlot wants to negotiate for it. There, the crew is imprisoned upon arrival, but he and a few of the others escape.

Grainger is separated from the rest and gets lost in the tunnels, eventually meeting up with some religious outcasts who have been shunned and who want to use him to help them seize the valuable cave and negotiate for their desires, which include escape to another world and validation.

Grainger and the exiles seize the cave and take some hostages, and Grainger learns there's a naturally occurring organism that can eat through the most common building material in the galaxy, and reproduces extremely rapidly given even moderate light. It could be valuable, and it could also be extremely destructive, eating cities.

The exile leader's demands are untenable, and so the hostage situation devolves into violence as the exiles leader is angered enough to try to murder Grainger, but Grainger, his reflexes enhanced by the wind, evades damage and regains control of the situation when the leader is blinded by his own burst.

Grainger later learns that the cave is worthless after all. The closed ecosystem of the cave was so stable that it couldn't handle the appearance of humans. All samples in the cave will be dead in a matter of days, no matter how many times they divide. The Hooded Swan leaves, ferrying the exiles to a new world.

=== Promised Land (1974) ===
Grainger "borrows" a car and accidentally runs into a little girl who has escaped from a colony of alien Anacaona on New Alexandria. Not knowing the situation, he refuses to return her to the local security officers chasing her, until Charlot sends the cops after him (including Grainger's friend Denton).

When the girl is later kidnapped by her own kind and taken to the Anacaona's home world, the Hooded Swan is sent to retrieve her. They fly to Chao Phrya, a world settled by a human generation ship, the Zodiac, whose descendants now believe it is their promised land, despite the presence of the Anacaona.

The kidnappers manage to land illegally in the jungle before Charlot can get permission from the uncooperative locals, who eventually agree to let the Hooded Swan land. Charlot chooses Grainger and Eve to join the local search party, which consists of two humans, Max and Linda, and three Anacaona, Danel, Michael, and Merce. As they travel, Grainger discovers that the Anacaona have minds adaptable to an almost absurd degree, and create completely human personalities simply to interact with humans.

He also learns the rumor that the kidnapped girl is an Idris, a false god of Anacaona mythology, which Grainger suspects means an earlier starfaring race that created the Anacaona.

The Anacaona on the search team start to take sick in the jungle, and through a series of mishaps, the group is quickly separated. Grainger travels with a still sick Michael and Merce, looking for the wild Anacaona of the jungle. They find an ancient, supposedly Idris, city, and are surrounded by giant spiderlike crypto-arachnids. Michael, who helps his brother hunt the beasts, tries to play his role by playing the music that hypnotizes them. Grainger manages to kill one, but there are many of them and Michael loses consciousness, so Grainger turns his body over to the wind and takes up the pipes himself. The wind plays through the night, keeping the spiders paralyzed, long enough for them to be discovered by Danel, who has shaken off the sickness. Danel kills the spiders, and they are joined by the wild Anacaona.

They also meet the kidnapper, who reveals that the girl is in fact an Idris, artificially created by Charlot who wanted a bridge to help him understand the Anacaona. The Anacaona felt they needed to expose the Anacaona people to Idris-ness, before she became polluted with human ideas. Now that that has been accomplished, Grainger and Eve are free to take the child back to the colony. The Anacaona remain far from understandable.

=== The Paradise Game (1974) ===
The Hooded Swan is on the planet Pharos, so that Charlot can mediate a dispute between the Caradoc company and a group called Aegis. The Caradoc company found a planet and began modifying it on a large scale into Paradise, for sale to the ultra-wealthy. Unfortunately, after they had begun, they discovered the planet was already inhabited by an intelligent, though primitive race. Caradoc claims to have signed a treaty with the aliens that promises eternal cooperation with Caradoc's goals. Aegis is a public interest group trying to fight on behalf of the aliens.

While Grainger is in a saloon full of hostile Caradoc employees who do not like him, one of the exclusively female aliens enters. A drunk named Varley tries to lead her upstairs, and she goes along until Grainger intervenes to escort her to safety. He narrowly averts a fight with Varley in the process.

Later, Charlot asks Grainger for his help. He needs Grainger to find or invent some reason to kick Caradoc off the planet, because without a firm reason that would get moral and political pressure on Caradoc, they might be inclined to ignore his ruling, and they might be powerful enough to back it up. If it comes to that, it would could set the stage for galactic war.

Grainger investigates the planet, learning that death seems to be completely unknown on the local life of Pharos, and that it's in complete balance. He and Charlot hypothesize that the development of a mutational filter now controls evolution there, rather than the traditional natural selection, and it has nudged the environment into complete stability.

While Grainger tries to solve the mystery, Johnny alerts him to two things. Firstly, there's a secret Caradoc battleship in orbit, just waiting for justification to land, and secondly, Johnny's found a hole which contains an interesting fossil... a large predator with claws and teeth, suggesting that the world was not always so peaceful. Before Grainger can discover what this means, he learns that one of the natives has been murdered, by Varley. While the authorities take him to the Hooded Swan (which contains facilities to hold him), Aegis, in a frustrated attempt to protest what they see as bias in Charlot's investigation, causes an explosion that destroys some of Caradoc's equipment. Varley escapes in the confusion, and, using the hunt for a fugitive as a pretext, the Caradoc troops are called down.

Grainger and Eve are later caught by Varley in the woods, who demands to be turned over to the Hooded Swan, rather than Caradoc. On the way back, he dies from some unknown infection. Later, it is learned there is sickness suddenly reported by many people on the planet, although none as serious as Varley's. It is Grainger who puts it together. The mutational filter has adapted itself to humanity, and it triggers the viruses in the human body to become fatal whenever it detects violent emotion.

The entire colony is quarantined and everyone has to try to rein in their emotions, and Grainger, with the help of the wind, comes up with a theory that helps Charlot develop a workable cure, although there are some deaths in the meantime.

=== The Fenris Device (1974) ===
Grainger is ordered to attempt a difficult landing on the surface of Leucifer V, as part of a rare diplomatic request by the Gallacellans, one of the oldest known starfaring races. The planet's atmosphere is dense and extremely turbulent, and the Hooded Swan is expected to be the only ship that can land, get whatever the Gallacellans want, and lift again. Grainger fails to land, and only barely manages to escape the atmosphere alive, and he categorically refuses to make another jump, even if it means reneging on his contract.

While Grainger is recovering from the first attempt, they receive a distress call and Grainger goes to intercept (taking along those already aboard: Eve, Johnny, Nick, and a Gallacellan intermediary named Ecdyon)... but it turns out the distress call is a ruse by a crazy man named Maslax who is convinced he has the ability to read minds.

Maslax sets a bomb on the Hooded Swan and threatens to detonate it if Grainger doesn't land on Leucifer V. Maslax wants the ancient Gallacellan ship that's been parked there, because he believes it contains an awesome weapon known as the Fenris Device. He wants to use it against the population of Pallant, as revenge for what he perceived as constant hatred and mocking for his size. Of course, everybody else knows that the Gallacellans have never used weapons, but Maslax is undeterred, claiming he read it in the mind of his former employer.

The wind privately informs Grainger that, over a thousand years ago, the Gallacellans did use weapons, and had huge wars, before they decided to give up violence entirely. He knows this because, before encountering Grainger, his last host was a Gallacellan who crash-landed on Lapthorn's Grave about a thousand years ago.

Grainger tries to stall and look for an opening to get the detonator away from Maslax, but eventually must attempt the landing, and he barely succeeds. Maslax takes Grainger, Eve, and Ecdyon in the Iron Maiden overland across the planet's surface to the location of the Gallacellan ship, only to find it is much bigger than expected, the size of a city. While trying to activate it, Maslax is startled when the artificial gravity shifts on (and shifts direction), and accidentally fires his weapon, seriously wounding Ecdyon.

The group manages to activate the ship, but it is pre-programmed for a destination and begins to lift automatically. Grainger suspects it is an emigration ship, designed to take a whole population out of the galaxy. A police ship attempts to stop the vessel, but when it fires on them it's revealed that the ship does indeed have a powerful weapon... an automatic and purely defensive one, that annihilates any ship within range once it's activated... and they don't know how to turn it off.

After the police ship is destroyed, Maslax refuses to let Grainger warn an approaching Gallacellan ship about the weapon, so he decides he must make his move. He demonstrates without question that Maslax can't read minds, destroying his delusion and distracting him long enough to get the weapon and detonator away from him.

Unfortunately, Ecdyon is too injured to communicate with his people, and no human speaks Gallacellan... but by turning control of his body over to the wind, the wind is able to make himself understood. They are able to disable their ship and the weapon and arrange for a rescue, but in the process, Ecdyon dies.

Johnny, and Nick are still down on the planet's surface, and neither of them have the ability to bring the Hooded Swan to orbit. Grainger officially quits his job, reincurring his full twenty-thousand debt. Then, he volunteers to make a difficult drop to the surface of the planet without a ship, in order to bring it back up and rescue the crew. However, he won't do it for free. He wants a salvage fee. He wants Charlot to pay off the entirety of his debt.

Charlot agrees, and Grainger makes the drop and returns the Swan to the surface, and then leaves Charlot's employ to start a life of his own.

=== Swan Song (1975) ===
Grainger is working as pilot on a small, undermaintained ship. While on a planet, he goes drinking with the engineer, Sam, and the two are approached by a man named Soulier who wants to hire Grainger. The man works for Caradoc, and wants the secrets Grainger might have learned working for Charlot. Soulier makes a series of attractive offers and veiled threats, but Grainger continues to refuse.

Upon leaving the bar they are approached by thugs, hired by Soulier, and though they evade them, Sam and Grainger realize that Caradoc is going to get him one way or the other unless he flees. Grainger attempts just that, and Sam comes along out of loyalty and dissatisfaction with his job. The two are quickly arrested for minor crimes, which threatens to apply legal pressure to the offer, but Denton arrives from New Alexandria with a way out... a warrant of his own, to arrest Grainger for the much more serious crime of kidnapping (which occurred in Promised Land). Because extradition is required, Denton takes Grainger back to New Alexandria. Sam, because he's unimportant, unemployable, and Grainger owes him, tags along.

At New Alexandria (after his acquittal), Grainger is approached by Johnny who tells him that Eve and Nick (and Rothgar, who was serving as their engineer) are dead. They took the Sister Swan (a second ship of the same design as the Hooded Swan) into the Nightingale Nebula, an unexplained phenomenon that Charlot believed was an interface between our universe and another, and they haven't been seen since. Grainger soon learns that Charlot believes there's a chance the ship and its crew might be alive, and wants Grainger to fly them in. He's willing to come along to prove his theory.

Grainger agrees, but he does not like the scenario, or all the lives that would be risked. He impulsively decides to take Sam as his engineer and steal the ship and take it through the interface. The trip there is hazardous and, the ship is damaged upon entry to the other universe. Grainger also learns that Charlot's doctor was aboard when the ship was taken. However, they are able to find the Sister Swan.

Grainger goes out to the other ship in a minimal craft, but the journey is complicated by the nature of the universe. The wind informs Grainger that the universe itself is a mind, and that if it manages to understand them, or vice versa, they will cease to exist, and that the danger will be greater when they are out on their own between ships.

Aboard the sister ship, Grainger finds that Rothgar is dead, Nick is well and conscious, but Eve is catatonic. The wind also doubts that it will be able to survive the return journey, as it is made to interface with minds and understand them and came close on the journey there. As such, it has a last wish, that Grainger listen to the story of its life, and remember. The wind dies on the trip back.

Back at the Hooded Swan, Sam has become completely blind. With no one else qualified to perform the role of engineer, Grainger takes the job and trusts that Eve will regain herself and be able to serve as pilot once attached to the relatively undamaged, and active, Hooded Swan.

When they make it home it is learned that in terms of subjective time outside the nebula, they have been gone for months, and Charlot has died of natural causes after proclaiming them all heroes.
