= Into the Drowning Deep =

2017 novel by Mira Grant

- Cover art for Into the Drowning Deep
- Author: Mira Grant
- Language: English
- Genre: Horror, Science fiction
- Set in: 2022, Mariana Trench, Challenger Deep
- Publisher: Orbit Books
- Publication date: 14 November 2017
- Media type: Print, ebook
- Pages: 448 (Hardcover)
- ISBN: 978-0316379403
- Preceded by: Rolling in the Deep
- Website: https://www.miragrant.com/books/into-the-drowning-deep/

Into the Drowning Deep is a 2017 science fiction horror novel by Mira Grant. It is the follow-up to her 2015 novella Rolling in the Deep. It focuses on Tory Stewart, a sonar specialist who becomes obsessed with mermaids after her sister's disappearance. Tory's sister Anne worked as a reporter for Imagine Entertainment. While filming a mockumentary about mermaids, the crew of Imagine's ship Atargatis vanished. Tory vows to discover the truth about what happened to her sister.

== Plot ==
Seven years prior to the start of the story, the Atargatis is lost at sea. The ship was sent to the Mariana Trench by Imagine Entertainment, which specializes in filming B movies about mythical creatures. Though the ship is recovered weeks later, there is no trace of the crew. Leaked footage from the ship appears to show mermaids slaughtering the crew. The public is highly skeptical of the video and it is largely believed that the footage was being created for a mockumentary. Though some believe the footage is proof of the existence of mermaids, the incident is largely forgotten by popular culture.

Theodore Blackwell is an Imagine representative who begins recruiting interested parties for a second voyage to the Mariana Trench aboard the Melusine. His goal is to prove the existence of mermaids and to capture a live specimen, restoring the reputation of Imagine. He is accompanied by several hundred scientists and crew members, including his estranged wife Dr. Jillian Toth, Tory Stewart, Imagine reporter Olivia Sanderson, and the three Wilson sisters, all scientists.

At the Mariana Trench, Heather Wilson attempts to become the first human to reach the Challenger Deep in a submersible. She is killed by mermaids, proving their existence. Theodore captures a mermaid and keeps it in a tank. Over the course of several days, scouting parties of mermaids kill several crew members. Olivia and Tory begin a romantic relationship. The ship is then swarmed by mermaids, resulting in the deaths of most of the crew members. As the ship's safety systems fail, Dr. Toth works to unravel the mysteries of mermaid physiology and save the remaining crew. Hallie Wilson learns to communicate with the captive mermaid via sign language, which saves several crew members from being eaten. Tory realizes that all of the mermaids are actually male, and that the female is a ship-sized behemoth who is slowly moving toward the ship. She uses undersea lights to repel the female, and Olivia helps repair the ship's dysfunctional safety shutters. The surviving crew members are rescued days later.

== Reception ==
Gerry Paige Smith of BookPage gave the novel a positive review, calling it original and stating it "will unnerve and enthrall even seasoned horror fans." Kirkus Reviews gave the novel a mostly positive review. They praised the novel's atmosphere of claustrophobic horror, while criticizing its length and excessive parenthetical asides. They positively compared the work to Jurassic Park and also praised Grant's smart commentary about climate change and the exploitation of sea creatures. Publishers Weekly gave a mixed review, praising the novel's concept and gore, while criticizing the writing style as clichéd and meandering.
