= The Whisper =

2012 book by Emma Clayton

- First edition
- Author: Emma Clayton
- Cover artist: Phil Falco
- Language: English
- Genre: Science fiction, Suspense
- Publisher: Chicken House Ltd
- Publication date: 1 February 2012
- Publication place: England
- Media type: Print
- Pages: 320
- ISBN: 1905294891
- Preceded by: The Roar

The Whisper is a post-apocalyptic novel for children by British author Emma Clayton. It was published in 2012 by Chicken House Publishing. It is a sequel to The Roar.

== Plot summary ==
After discovering that the world was not covered by catastrophic plague or poisonous yellow dust, telepathic twins Mika and Ellie realized that the government lied to the population. The governing elite wanted the people to believe this so that the rich could live in luxury on the southern side of the Wall while most of the rest of the people starved in cramped conditions in the north.

Mal Gorman, a man who has avoided death for many years, controls the north and has an army of mutated children. He plans to break down the Wall and start a war against the south, but the children realize that this will have disastrous consequences. The twins join his army to work against him from the inside.
