= Meendum Jeano =

1987 novel by Sujatha Rangarajan

Meendum Jeano (English: The Return of Jeano) is a Tamil science fiction novel written by Indian writer Sujatha in 1987 as a sequel to En Iniya Iyanthira. Prior to release, it was believed that Rajini's film Enthiran was based on these two novels,

== Plot ==
Ravi and Mano have taken over Jeeva's dictatorship and rule the country with his holographic image without public knowledge. Since Nila is the most beautiful woman they make her a queen of the new kingdom. But Nila is a queen only nominally, Ravi and Mano control the entire government. Jeano, the robo pet of Nila, helps her find her husband and with a self learning mechanism reveals many truths about the present situation. It learns many things from various authors through a variety of book collections and keeps them in its knowledge base. Since its interfering in Ravi and Mano's secret government, they ban all robopets in the country but Jeano finds Nila and tries to help her.
