= Slaves of the Klau =

1958 novel by Jack Vance

First edition (publ. Ace Books Cover art by Ed Valigursky

Slaves of the Klau is a science fiction novel by American writer Jack Vance written in 1958. It is about an Earth man, Roy Barch, who is kidnapped into slavery by a warlike alien race, the Klau and taken to a forced labour planet. Roy develops a plan to escape back to Earth by stealing an anti-gravity ship from the Klau and turning it into a spaceship.

Vance's preferred title is Gold and Iron, with gold being a reference to the gold skin tone of the benevolent Lekthwan aliens and iron a reference to Roy Barch's iron-willed resolution to escape his captors. It was first published in Space Stories magazine with the title Planet of the Damned; when Ace published it in a book, they changed the title to Slaves of the Klau and altered Vance's text with some cuts. In the 2002 Vance Integral Edition, Vance's preferred title (Gold and Iron) and the previously cut text were restored.

It was earlier reprinted as a hardback by Underwood Miller on Jan. 1, 1982.

== Plot ==
Roy Barch is a young Earth man who is the son of a scientist. His dreams of following his father's profession have been ended by the arrival on Earth of a benevolent alien race, the Lekthwan, which is far more advanced than humans. The Lekthwan pass on enough of their advanced science that many Earth scientists find that their knowledge has become obsolete, including Roy, who becomes a servant for a Lekthwan. One day, the alien's wife and two daughters arrive on Earth in a spaceship. The 20-year-old daughter, who Roy calls Ellen, is a cultural anthropologist and scientist. Roy asks her out on a date to hear a jazz band.

When they arrive home, her family has been killed by huge aliens from the Klau race, who kidnap Roy and Ellen. The pair are transported to Magarak, a grim, dank Klau mining and manufacturing planet to work as slaves. Ellen is resigned to her fate, and says escape is impossible, but Roy insists that he will escape and get back to Earth. They escape to the wilderness, where they meet a tribe of other fugitive slaves led by a towering Klau named Clet. Every week, Klau and their Podruods (a subspecies of Klau used as warriors and fighters) come on flying rafts to hunt slave fugitives for sport. Roy suggests to Clet that the tribe fight back against the Klau hunters, but Clet wants to continue the statu quo.

Roy leaves the tribe's cave, intending to become an exile. While he is in the woods, he spots a flying raft of Klau hunters coming towards the cave. He shoots the Klau and takes their alien rifles, which he uses to kill Clet (who Roy believes will never agree to fight the Klau). Roy announces he is the new leader of the tribe and tells them that they can escape from Magarak. While many dismiss his plan as hopeless, Roy argues that if they steal flying barges, they may be able to jury-rig an airtight enclosure and fly through space. He leads raiding expeditions to steal barges and equipment and they weld two barges face to face and mount life-supporters inside. As their raids continue, Roy realizes that the Klau will likely soon strike back. He mines the bluff overlooking the cave mouth with explosives and has a third barge filled with high explosives.

When the Klau attack, they fly to the bluff, and Roy triggers the explosions. Roy orders the tribe to make the final preparations on their improvised space vessel, and then he sets out to take the explosives-filled air barge to the command and control center of the Klau on Magarek. Roy destroys it the Klau headquarters and returns to the cave. However, the tribe has left, including Ellen, and the improvised spaceship is gone. After a period, another air barge arrives filled with new fugitive slaves. Roy leads the creation of a second improvised spaceship, and they get back to Earth. He is hailed as a hero in the war against the Klau slavers. He goes to see Ellen again, and she asks him to marry her. At first he refuses, on the grounds that they are too different, and he fears that her advanced alien race looks down on humans. In the end he decides to take a risk and marry her.
