= Starsight =

Young adult novel by Brandon Sanderson

- First edition (US)
- Author: Brandon Sanderson
- Cover artist: Charlie Bowater
- Language: English
- Series: Cytoverse
- Genre: Science fiction novel
- Publisher: Delacorte Press
- Publication date: November 26, 2019
- Pages: 480
- ISBN: 978-0-399-55581-7
- Preceded by: Skyward
- Followed by: Cytonic

Starsight is a 2019 young adult (Note: It is published as an adult novel outside of the US.) science fiction novel written by American author Brandon Sanderson. It is the sequel to Skyward and second in a planned series of four books. It was published by Delacorte Press on November 26, 2019.

== Plot ==
Spensa and the DDF have pushed the Krell war into space; Spensa's cytonic "defect" has been a key advantage in the war. Cobb, now the DDF admiral, is worried that humans will lose unless they manage to steal a Krell hyperdrive, as the Superiority is sending increasing numbers of warships into battle. Rodge and the engineers discover footage showing a creature known as a 'Delver' consuming and destroying the first inhabitants of Detritus - Spensa recognizes it as the eyes that she sees in the Nowhere when using her cytonic powers.

A cytonic alien named Alanik crash lands on Detritus and cytonically implants her destination into Spensa's mind. Spensa learns that Alanik was traveling from her own backwater world to a Superiority space station called Starsight to train as a pilot. Using M-Bot's holographic technology, Spensa disguises herself as Alanik and, using Alanik's coordinates, teleports herself, M-Bot, and Doomslug to Starsight. Spensa poses as Alanik in order to infiltrate the pilot program and steal a hyperdrive.

Spensa quickly finds herself caught in a political game between Cuna, a dione government minister, and Winzik, head of the department that is battling Spensa and her people. Spensa is put into a training flight consisting of the misfit dione Morriumur, Captain Hesho and his crew of tiny kitsen, the figment Vapor, and a rare Superiority human, Brade. The pilots are being trained specifically to fight delvers, which can be drawn into this realm by overuse of cytonics. The humans summoned delvers which destroyed numerous planets during a past war, and while these delvers are long since gone, there is suspicion that they may soon reappear. Spensa befriends all her flightmates except the stand-offish Brade, and she and the group frequently run training exercises on a fake delver maze (the delver's core). Back on Detritus, Jorgen begins manifesting cytonic powers.

Spensa builds a small drone with M-Bot's help and sneaks it into a battleship engine room. She recovers the drone and learns that the Superiority hyperdrives (which don't attract delvers) are powered by slugs like Doomslug. Spensa is caught by Cuna, but Spensa realizes that Cuna is actually pushing for species integration and peace with the humans in the government. Spensa reveals her true self to Cuna, and the two agree to potential peace talks.

Winzik mobilizes the pilots against the Detritus humans in a bold political move. Spensa reveals herself to Brade, trying to earn Brade's trust, but Brade ousts Spensa, and she is forced to flee to her home planet, abandoning M-Bot. The Superiority arrives and a battle commences; Spensa realizes that Winzik and Brade are plotting to summon a delver and frame the humans for it. As the battle rages, Spensa enlists Vapor and Hesho's crew to stop Brade from summoning the delver. However, Brade kills Hesho in a dogfight and they are too late to stop her from summoning the monstrous creature. A desperate Spensa cytonically redirects it to Starsight instead. Realizing what she has done, Spensa teleports herself, Vapor, and the surviving kitsen to Starsight, where they are joined by Morriumur. Morriumur is able to guide Spensa to the heart of the delver maze, where she is able to send the delver back to its own realm before it destroys the station.

On Detritus, Jorgen uses his cytonic ability to discover a hidden cavern filled with hyperdrive slugs. Spensa is cared for on Starsight, where she and Cuna are optimistic for successful peace talks. However, Winzik throws a coup and frames Spensa for multiple murders. Spensa helps Cuna to safety, and recovers Doomslug and M-Bot, who has transferred his consciousness to the drone as Winzik's forces dismantled him. With Winzik's forces closing in, Spensa and her companions M-bot and Doomslug escape into the Nowhere.

== Characters ==
Call signs are denoted in parentheses.

- Spensa Nightshade (Spin/Spring): A skilled DDF pilot with cytonic powers, which allow her to access a dimension she refers to as the Nowhere. Headstrong and aggressive, she undertakes a dangerous mission infiltrating the Superiority, posing as the alien Alanik.
- Jorgen Weight (Jerkface): Spensa's flightleader, romantic interest, and possible cytonic.
- Admiral Cobb (Mongrel): Spensa's former flight instructor, now the admiral of the DDF.
- M-Bot: Spensa's advanced AI starship of unknown origin. He is highly talkative and frequently ponders whether he is truly alive or not.
- Alanik: An UrDail cytonic from a backwater world ReDawn with humanoid features who crash lands on Detritus, while she is traveling to Starsight to join the Superiority's pilot program. Spensa takes her identity and her place within the program.
- Morriumur: An alien dione "draft", who is anxious to prove themself by becoming a skilled pilot. Informally given the call sign "Complains."
- Captain Hesho: The former monarch of the kitsen aliens, who have converted to a democratic system to appease the Superiority. Hesho commands a ship of approximately fifty kitsen within the Superiority's piloting program. He is succeeded by Kauri after his death.
- Vapor: An incorporeal alien figment, effectively a living scent. She commands Spensa's Superiority flight. Informally given the call sign "The Wind That Mingles with a Man's Dying Breath" by Hesho.
- Cuna: A high ranking Superiority government official, who has taken a keen interest in Spensa's progress in the piloting program.
- Winzik: The leader of the Department of Protective Services, what Spensa knows as the Krell. He is highly ambitious, and is a political rival to Cuna.
- Brade: A human cytonic pilot who reports directly to Winzik, and serves him with reverence.
- Doomslug: Spensa's bizarre pet alien slug.
- Delvers: The delvers, sometimes called the eyes, are ancient, extra-dimensional beings that live in the nowhere, the space beyond the world utilized by numerous cytonic abilities. They can occasionally emerge into the physical space, where they pose major threat to all living beings.

== Reception ==
Kirkus Reviews praised the over-the-top reckless heroine and the colorful supporting cast then said overall it was "not quite the wild ride of Skyward but still great fun." On the science fiction website Tor.com, Deana Whitney and Darci Cole said about Starsight: "[the book] offers fun times just as Skyward did, with more worldbuilding, some favorite returning characters [and] amazing new characters and settings, and a ramped-up storyline leaving us dying to read more."

On the week of December 14, 2019, Starsight topped The New York Times Best Sellers list for Young Adult novels.

== Sequels ==
In December 2018, Sanderson confirmed in his yearly "State of the Sanderson" that there would be four books set in the Skyward universe; books 3 and 4 were released in 2021 and 2023, respectively. The third book titled Cytonic released on November 23, 2021 and the fourth titled Defiant released in 2023. Sunreach, ReDawn, and Evershore, audiobook-original novellas co-written with Janci Patterson, released around the same time.
