= Lamb (Hill novel) =

2023 novel by Matt Hill

- First edition cover
- Author: Matt Hill
- Cover artist: Luke Bird
- Language: English
- Genres: Science fiction; Horror
- Publisher: Dead Ink
- Publication date: 12 October 2023
- Publication place: United Kingdom
- Media type: Trade paperback
- Pages: 336
- ISBN: 978-1-915368-04-1

Lamb is a science fiction and horror novel by English novelist Matt Hill. It is his fifth novel and was first published in the United Kingdom in October 2023 by Dead Ink. The novel is set in northern England in the near future. In Hill's entry in The Encyclopedia of Science Fiction, author and critic John Clute described Lamb as a teenage boy's "coming-of-age quest" amidst the horrors of a decaying Britain.

== Plot summary ==
Dougie, a truck driver, is killed while protesting against his company that made him redundant by introducing self-driving trucks. His wife, Maureen, and their teenage son, Boyd move from Watford in eastern England to the small town of Sile in the Pennines in northern England. There Boyd finds his mother's behaviour becoming more and more erratic, and a strange mould starts appearing on the ceilings and walls of their house. Despite Boyd's best efforts to look after her and keep their house clean, Maureen disappears one day. By now the mould is out of control, and Boyd abandons the house.

Boyd meets Leigh, a young woman who works for Gaff, a scrap merchant. She lets Boyd share her trailer with her, and together they scavenge a local dump site looking for anything of value for Gaff. One day, on a mound of rubbish, Boyd finds a baby girl. He names her Lamb, and Boyd and Leigh take her in. They assume the arduous task of bringing her up, but Lamb turns out not to be a normal child. She develops far too quickly, and soon the same mysterious mould starts to appear in Leigh's trailer.

In a backstory, Maureen's childhood with her mother, Joan is revealed. Like Lamb, Maureen also undergoes an accelerated development. As a child, and far too advanced for her age, Maureen has several miscarriages. Joan refers to them as "bad copies", and they bury them in their vegetable patch. Later, and despite Joan's warning that Maureen must not leave their house, an inquisitive Maureen sneaks out one night, and meets a young truck driver named Dougie.

Back in the present, Boyd, looking for clues as to his mother's whereabouts, returns to their house in Sile. It has been completely colonised by the mould, but under piles of rot and decay, he finds a photograph with an address on the back. Boyd returns to the landfill and, using Gaff's beat-up van, he takes Leigh and Lamb across the country to the address in the Cotswolds to find his mother and the truth about Maureen and Lamb's origins.

== Critical reception ==
Reviewing Lamb in The Famtasy Hive, Jonathan Thornton described Hill's latest novel as "another triumph of speculative imagination". He stated that Lamb's "decaying environs of the north of Britain in the near future" is "strange [and] beautiful" and "perhaps the most profoundly empathetic of [Hill's] novels yet". Thornton called the novel a "remarkable exploration of the post-human condition", and "an exemplary work of speculative fiction that effortlessly delves into the uncanny and the horrific to describe a truly modern state of being."

British speculative fiction author Nina Allan wrote that Lamb "is as brilliant as anything [Hill] has yet written". She said Hill continues "with his core themes of future-shock, environmental degradation and the structural imbalances". Allan stated that "Lamb is a unique blend of the personal and the political, the kind of work that reminds us how radical science fiction can be, how well it retains the power to shock and to surprise." American speculative fiction author, Lisa Tuttle wrote in The Guardian that Lamb is a "SF/horror hybrid" with Frankenstein-like themes of "experiments in the creation of life" and "scientific overreach". She called Lamb "a disturbing novel that’s humane and weirdly beautiful."
