= Under Strange Suns =

Science fiction novel by Ken Lizzi

- first edition
- Author: Ken Lizzi
- Cover artist: Brad Fraunfelter
- Language: English
- Genre: Science fiction
- Publisher: Twilight Times Books
- Publication date: 2015
- Publication place: United States
- Media type: Print (paperback), ebook
- Pages: 298
- ISBN: 978-1-60619-344-0

Under Strange Suns is a science fiction novel written by American author Ken Lizzi, published in trade paperback and ebook by Twilight Times Books in December 2015.

== Plot summary ==
Retiring Special Forces soldier Aidan Carson is enlisted by Brooklynn Vance, niece of the lost inventor of the faster than light drive, to help find her uncle. Hence he finds himself leaving chaos-plagued Earth, beset by terrorist attacks and religious warfare, for an interstellar voyage of rescue and exploration on the starship Yuscehnkov. He finds space travel dangerous, and war a constant, even on alien worlds. Soon he is once again at war, this time to defend an alien race.

== Reception ==
Steve Perry writes "Ken Lizzi's new novel blasts off in an action-packed flight to worlds far away, in a cross between John Carter and Star Trek, with just a dab of Starship Troopers tossed in. And it's swords and guns and aliens, oh, my ... What's not to like?"

Publishers Weekly calls the novel "[b]rilliant in some ways, broken in others," finding it has "some strong points but significant flaws," with "a great pulp-like feel to the exploration, theoretical technology, and desperate battles, but generic characters and bloated sentences [which] weigh the story down," noting that "Lizzi keeps all of the female characters on the sidelines, while male humans and aliens pay key roles." The reviewer feels the story "[t]read[s] dangerously close to Islamophobia in early scenes, ... recovers by moving ... off Earth, only to stumble once more by creating an alien theocracy that hews too close to fearmongering portrayals of Islam." Summing up, "this work suggests that Lizzi is a writer to watch--but not necessarily one to read just yet."
