= Template (novel) =

2008 novel by Matt Hughes

- First edition
- Author: Matthew Hughes
- Cover artist: Chris Erkmann
- Language: English
- Genre: Science fiction
- Publisher: P.S. Publishing
- Publication date: 2008
- Media type: Print
- ISBN: 9781905834617

Template is a Canadian science fiction novel by Matthew Hughes, published by PS Publishing. It follows the adventures of a professional duelist who is drawn into a murder mystery. The novel explores differences between various cultures.

== Reception ==
Matthew Hughes has been called one of Canada's best science fiction writers and his novel Template has been considered to be one of his best novels.

Another review noted that this novel is part detective story, part space opera and part investigation into the clash of cultures.
