= The Moon and the Face =

1985 novel by Patricia A. McKilip

- Cover of first edition
- Author: Patricia A. McKillip
- Cover artist: Stephen Marchesi
- Language: English
- Series: Kyreol series
- Genre: Science fiction
- Publisher: Atheneum
- Publication date: 1985
- Publication place: United States
- Media type: Print (hardcover)
- Pages: 146
- ISBN: 0-689-31158-3
- Preceded by: Moon-Flash

The Moon and the Face is a science fiction novel for juvenile readers by Patricia A. McKillip, a sequel to her earlier novel Moon-Flash. It was first published in hardcover by Atheneum in September 1985, with a paperback edition issued by Berkley Books in October 1986. It was subsequently combined with its prequel Moon-Flash in an omnibus edition, also titled Moon-Flash, issued in paperback and ebook by Firebird/Penguin in March 2005.

== Summary ==
Four years after the events of Moon-Flash, Kyreol has trained in the Dome city to be a space pilot, while her friend Terje becomes a hunter-observer. Alternating chapters follow Kyreol into space and Terje back to their original primitive home on Riverworld. When Kyreol crash lands on a Niade moon, her adventure becomes a struggle for survival dominated by an ancient, abandoned white city; meanwhile, Terje takes on the role of Healer in their old community after Kyreol's father dies. By reestablishing her place there by painting her portrait on a ritual cave wall, he prepares the way for her return.

== Reception ==
In a starred review in School Library Journal, Yvonne A. Frey calls the book "[r]ich in imagery, description and characterization," "filled with dichotomies" and with a "suspenseful pace," concluding that "[a]lthough it is a short book, The Moon and the Face is packed with imagery and symbolism that demand second thoughts and readings, and are well worth them."

The book was also reviewed by Charles de Lint in Science Fiction Review v. 15, no. 1, Spring 1986, and Valerie Broege in Fantasy Review v. 9, no. 10, November 1986.
