= The Twelve-Fingered Boy =

Paranormal novel

- First edition
- Author: John Hornor Jacobs
- Language: English
- Genre: Young adult novel
- Published: 2013 (Carolrhoda Lab)
- Publication place: USA
- Media type: Print (paperback)
- Pages: 264
- ISBN: 9780761390077
- OCLC: 793991473
- Followed by: The Shibboleth

The Twelve-Fingered Boy is a 2013 young adult novel by John Hornor Jacobs. It is about teenagers, Shreve Cannon, and Jack Graves, who have psychic abilities.

== Reception ==
A review in Publishers Weekly of The Twelve Fingered Boy wrote "Jacobs skillfully builds tension and mystery throughout.", while Kirkus Reviews wrote "Against the plethora of mutant and superhuman narratives, this effort just feels shopworn.".

The Twelve-Fingered Boy has also been reviewed by Booklist, School Library Journal, Horn Book Guides Library Media Connection, and Common Sense Media.

It won a 2013 Moonbeam Children's Book Award gold medal.
