= En Iniya Iyanthira =

Science fiction novel

- En Iniya Iyanthira
- Author: Sujatha
- Language: Tamil
- Genre: Science-fiction
- Publisher: New Horizon Media; Visa Publications
- Publication place: India
- ISBN: 978-81-8493-555-4
- Followed by: Meendum Jeano

En Iniya Iyanthira (English: My Dear Machine) is a Tamil dystopian science fiction novel written by Indian writer Sujatha. In the late 1980s Sujatha wrote this novel as a series in the popular Tamil magazine Dinamani Kathir. Following the success of En Iniya Enthira, Sujatha wrote a follow-up/sequel to this novel, Meendum Jeano. The novel was made into a serial and released on Doordarshan in 1991. The main antagonist Jeeva was played by veteran actor Charu Haasan, Nila by Sivaranjini, Sibi by Shiva and Ravi by Anand.

The story of the En iniya Enthira revolves around a dictator who rules India and 3 rebels organising a coup against him including a girl named Nila and a robot dog named Jeeno. The film Enthiran starring Rajinikanth is slightly based on this novel.

== Plot ==
The plot opens up in the year 2021 where India is ruled by a dictator called Jeeva. In his rule, the population is kept under control by killing elderly people when they cross the prescribed age limit. Everyone is allotted a unique name with two syllables by the government. Every citizen of the country must strictly adhere to the rules of Jeeva and admire, adore him. The country is in total control of Jeeva's robots. People are identified only with their social security numbers and all the details are fed and controlled by Master Computer at Capital City.

On a New Year's Eve, Nila, a homemaker is very delighted for having the Government's permission letter to have a boy baby from Population Control Board. She intimates the news to her husband Sibi. While Government, allots a home space of Nila's residence for a man named Ravi and his pet Jeano. Jeano is a Robotic pet which can speak. As per the government's rule, home space should not be allotted to more than three people. So Nila's husband leaves to verify about Ravi's allotment but does not return home. Nila, tries to find him but in vain, she uses his social security number but finds that such a person does not exist.

What happened to Sibi? What is the role of Ravi in Sibi's disappearance? How Nila finds her husband and a shocking truth about Jeeva and his dictatorship with the help of Jeano?

The rest of story moves with the answers to these questions.

== Characters ==
Name	Characters
Sibi	Nila's husband
Nila	Sibi's wife
Jiva	King
Jino	The Robot Dog
Ravi	Jino's owner
Mano	Ravi's friend

== Themes ==
Very high tech computer technology terms are used in the story. Jeano, a pet robot plays an important role throughout the story. As the story proceeds, it behaves and starts to think on its own like a human and instructs Nila, a human being to proceed further. The writer's perspective of a future India interests readers and paves a new way to science fiction.

== See also ==
- Indian science-fiction films
- Enthiran
