= Skyship Academy: The Pearl Wars =

Book by Nick James

- First edition
- Author: Nick James
- Cover artist: Derek Lea
- Language: English
- Series: Skyship Academy Trilogy
- Genre: Science fiction
- Publication date: 2011
- Pages: 376
- ISBN: 978-0-7387-2341-9
- Dewey Decimal: YA-James
- Followed by: Skyship Academy: Crimson Rising

Skyship Academy: The Pearl Wars is a science fiction novel by Nick James.

== Background ==
In 1994, the United States is recovering from the Scarlet Bombings, a series of chemical bomb attacks against the top cities in the country, supposedly orchestrated by terrorists. The country has divided into two separate political entities, with the surface controlled by the old U.S. government, headed by the United Party, and the skies held by the Skyshippers, who live in gigantic, city-like ships in the stratosphere. Both are dependent on "pearls", a coveted source of energy, to run their homes. The Skyshippers seek fuel to keep their cities aloft, and the United Party requires energy to sustain the Bio-nets, spheres that protect special "Chosen Cities" from the wasteland created by the chemical bombings. These pearls are hunted down by specially trained men and women on both sides called Pearl Hounds. These Pearl Hounds work in direct opposition to each other, each trying to find the pearls before the others do.

== Plot summary ==
Jesse Fisher is a young Skyshipper out on a pearl-collecting mission with his teammates Skandar and Eva. When scoping out a building, he is attacked from behind by a United Party pearl hound, Cassius Stevenson. Jesse ends up hanging off the edge of the 12 story, but when touched by Cassius, a strange explosion blasts him off the roof and Cassius back onto the roof. Jesse survives the fall and Eva retrieves the pearl, but they lose it to Cassius, who comes back to retrieve the pearl. The three board their shuttle and return to the Skyship Academy.
Cassius, also surviving the blast, returns to his base of operations, the Lodge, in Rochester, New York, the 17th Chosen City. He meets with his leader and instructor, Madame, and tells her of the events that took place in the Fringe. They soon separate, but when Cassius returns to his room, he explodes in fire. Waking up a short time later, he finds that he was left unharmed. Madame then assigns him a mission to infiltrate the Skyship Academy, posing as a possible student/recruit.
Meanwhile, in the academy, Jesse goes about life as normal, until a pearl happens to go shooting out from space down towards the flying skyship. He then proceeds to somehow control the pearl and curve its trajectory, protecting the academy. This is remarkable, as pearls are known to never change course. Shortly after, one of his friends, Avery, helps him eavesdrop on a meeting, where the head of the school and his teachers are discussing him and his mysterious background in Seattle, one of the bombed cities. They had found him there, amidst the chemically poisoned rubble, an abandoned orphan. He storms out in a fit of rage.
Cassius then successfully infiltrates the academy. He kidnaps Jesse and makes a beeline for the shuttles, but one of Jesse's teachers sacrifices his life to save Jesse. Avery then grabs Jesse, pulling him into a different shuttle. They make their escape, but Cassius grabs another shuttle and begins to pursue.
Two surface cruisers then intervene. They attempt to shoot down or capture Jesse and Avery's shuttle, but fail, as Avery crashes the vessel into another Chosen City. They are quickly caught by the local authorities and thrown in a holding cell. Jesse learns that Avery is a Unified Party worker who was put on the skyship academy with a fake background, and was to infiltrate skyship academy. Then she was feeding Madame information, she mentioned Jesse, who she is told to keep an eye on. She tells Jesses she was first friends with him because she was just following orders, but emotions got to her and they became true friends. She also states she knew Cassius was in the building, and that's why she made an attempt to save Jesse. However, it is just about then that a pearl comes streaking down towards the city. Jesse manages to control it and make it explode, disabling their captors and allowing them to escape. They make their way to a train to get away, but Cassius is still in hot pursuit. Once on the train, Cassius proceeds to explode in fire again, disabling the train and accidentally killing or wounding 500 people. Jesse and Avery escape into the Fringe, followed by Cassius. As the three slowly but surely make their way to Seattle, they are intercepted by both Skyshippers and Unified Party soldiers simultaneously. This leads to a firefight, Jesse and Avery being reunited with Skandar and Eva, and then all four making an escape, continuing to push on towards Seattle. Cassius keeps on following them.
When the four arrive at Seattle, they are led into a trap orchestrated by Madame. She holds Skandar, Eva, and Avery hostage and demands Jesse surrender himself to her so that she can use his powers. However, it is revealed through a message from their parents that Jesse and Cassius are actually brothers, separated early in life, and are also aliens, sent from their home planet to escape a bloody civil war. The alien Authority, or governing party, attacked Earth with the Scarlet bombings, seeking to conquer and colonize it. The pearls are actually a form of "transport energy" used for transporting members of their race from their home planet to Earth. Afterwards, the brothers separate again. Jesse returns to the academy, which heads to Eastern Siberia in order to set up a "welcoming zone" for incoming aliens released from the pearls. Cassius heads up across the Canada–US border, towards the Polar Cities, a group of cities on the polar ice cap, in order to regroup and figure out what to do next.

== Genre ==
While not strictly dystopian, it does include elements of a dystopian story, along with other science fiction elements such as space drama, future technology, and aliens. The author Nick James describes it as being "post-apocalyptic" and "science fiction." The story is told from two separate points of view, with Jesse Fisher telling his story from a "self doubting first person," while Cassius Stevenson's story is told in an "assured third person."

== Publication history ==
Skyship Academy: The Pearl Wars was published by Flux in September, 2011. Flux has also published the second book of the series, Skyship Academy: Crimson Rising, and will publish the final book of the trilogy, Skyship Academy: Strikeforce.

== Reception ==
An interview in Publishers Weekly called the book a “…fast-paced adventure" which "delivers solid action sequences throughout…” Another review praised James' "descriptions of airships... [the] surface and the Chosen Cities." They also said that the secondary characters "all add something extra to the story." His characters have been called "really quite marvelous," but some requested that he went into more background with side characters.
