= Emma Clayton =

British children's novelist

- Born: United Kingdom
- Occupation: Writer
- Writing career
- Language: English

Emma Clayton is a British children's novelist and author of dystopian thrillers, The Roar and The Whisper. The Roar was nominated for the Carnegie Medal 2009, won the Yorkshire Coast Book Award and was selected for the USBBY 2010 Outstanding International Books Honor List and the 2010 Texas Lone Star Reading List.

== Life ==
The daughter of a Royal Air Force officer, Emma Clayton moved frequently as a child until her father's death when she was seven years old. In her late teens, she trained as a field archaeologist, spent a brief time working as a freelance illustrator, then returned to education in her mid-twenties, studying film and screenwriting. She wrote her first novel when she was 26, following the birth of her daughter, then wrote The Roar several years later while studying for a Higher National Diploma in Visual Communications.

Clayton's first book, a middle grade novel called The Roar, was published by Chicken House in July 2008 in the United Kingdom and April 2009 in the United States. In February 2012, Chicken House published the sequel, The Whisper, in both the United Kingdom and United States. Both Roar and Whisper follow separated twins Mika and Ellie, who use a government scheme to find one another on a walled planet full of lies.

== Awards and honors ==
- USBBY Outstanding International Books Honor List, 2010
- Texas Library Association's Lone Star Reading List, 2010
- Yorkshire Coast Book Award, 2010

== Published works ==
- The Roar (Chicken House, 2008)
- The Whisper (Chicken House, 2012)
