= Ken Lizzi =

American author (born 1969)

- Born: March 21, 1969 (age 57); Los Angeles County, California, U.S.
- Occupations: Author, lawyer
- Writing career
- Genre: speculative fiction
- Website: kenlizzi.net

Kenneth Allan Lizzi Jr. is an American lawyer and writer of speculative and crime fiction. He writes as Ken Lizzi.

== Biography ==
Lizzi was born March 21, 1969, in Los Angeles County, California, son of Kenneth Allan Lizzi Sr., and Barbara Kay Becraft. He grew up in Portland, Oregon, attending high school in West Linn, and college at Portland State University. As an adult he has served in the military and made his living as an attorney, writing on the side. He lived in Portland with his wife Isa, a native of Mexico, and daughter Victoria Valentina, until moving his family from Oregon to Texas in 2022, where they presently live in Houston. He collects paperback novels and antique weapons and enjoys reading, homebrewing, cooking, exercise, and travel.

== Literary career ==
Lizzi's self-proclaimed goal as a writer "is to help infuse a pulp sensibility into 21st Century fiction." He cites as influences Robert E. Howard, Raymond Chandler, Fritz Leiber, and Edgar Rice Burroughs, among others. His work has been published by Dark Horse Books, Short-Story.me, PulpEmpire; DeepWood Publishing, Kerlak Publishing, PulpCorner.com, Twilight Times Books, Aratus Scrivenery, and Aethon Books.

== Bibliography ==
=== Cesar the Bravo ===
- "Bravo" (in Pulp Empire Volume 6: Pirates & Swashbucklers (Aug. 2011))
- "The Fire Demon—or Brava" (in Swords and Sorcery Magazine, iss. 39, May 2015)
- "The Quarto Volume, or Knowledge, Good and Evil" (in Swords and Sorcery Magazine, iss. 48, Feb. 2016)
- "The Bronze Helm" (in Tales from the Magician's Skull, special #2, Oct. 2022)
- "The Red Hat" (in Cirsova Magazine, Winter 2024)
- "Witch Hunt" (in Cesar the Bravo, 2025)
- Cesar the Bravo (collection, 2025)

=== Falchion's Company ===
1. Boss (Jan. 2020)
2. Captain (Apr. 2020)
3. Warlord (Jun. 2020)

=== Semi-Autos and Sorcery ===
1. Blood and Jade (Aug. 2021)
2. Santa Anna's Sword (Sep. 2021)
3. Obsidian Owl (Oct. 2021)
4. Silver and Bone (Mar. 2023)

=== Twilight Galaxy trilogy ===
1. Dekason (Mar. 2026)
2. Long Gambit (Jul. 2026, forthcoming)

=== Other novels ===
- Reunion (Jan. 2014)
- Under Strange Suns (Aug. 2015)
- Thick As Thieves (May 2020)

=== Other short fiction ===
- "The Value of Proper Intelligence to Any Successful Military Campaign is Not to be Underestimated" (in Star Wars Tales 19, Apr. 2004) (with Lucas Marangon)
- "Trustworthy" (in Noir: A Collection of Crime Comics (Nov. 2009) (with Joëlle Jones)
- "Breaking the Line" (in Short-Story.Me! Best Genre Short Stories Anthology #1 (2010)
- Savage Journal (chapbook) (Feb. 2011)
- Murder Extempore (chapbook) (2012)
- "Bargains" (in The Big Bad: An Anthology of Evil (May 2013))
- "Escapement" (in Ancient New (Nov. 2013, reprinted May 2017))
- "Resource" (in The Ways of Magic (Mar. 2014))
- "Mischosen" (in The Death God's Chosen (May 2014), and Cosmic Scream (Feb. 2018))
- "Copperhead Road" (in Mama Tried: Crime Fiction Inspired By Outlaw Country Music (2016))
- "House Odds" (in Cirsova: Magazine of Thrilling Adventure and Daring Suspense, Winter 2022)
- Ursula Bruin (serialized on Kindle Vella, Aug. 27, 2023-Sep. 24, 2023)
- "Folgin the Grim: Retribution" (in Swords & Sorceries: Tales of Heroic Fantasy Volume 9, Nov. 2024)
- "Muck" (in Mercs and Mayhem, Oct. 2025)
- "A Twist of Fortune" (in Lost Worlds, Jan. 2026)
