= The Roar (novel) =

2008 novel by Emma Clayton

- First edition
- Author: Emma Clayton
- Illustrator: Jim Murray
- Cover artist: Ian Butterworth
- Language: English (United Kingdom)
- Series: The Roar
- Genre: Science fiction, Suspense
- Publisher: The Chicken House
- Publication date: 2008
- Publication place: England
- Media type: Print
- Pages: 481
- ISBN: 978-1-905294-63-3
- Followed by: The Whisper

The Roar is a 2008 post-apocalyptic novel for children by British author Emma Clayton. It was published by Chicken House Publishing.

== Plot ==
When the animal plague began, the entire population came together and built a solid concrete wall 50 feet high and 30 feet thick. This kept every single animal out of the human world. On the top of the entire wall, there is an electrified fence and invincible, laser hurling Genghis Borgs mounted every 90 yards. Behind this wall the population that survived has been living for more than 30 years. Many things have come about since space is limited. The government created a law that forbade people to have children. The Northern Hemisphere is where the population has gone to survive with all the other people in the world. Outside of "The Wall" the majority of the population has been made to believe that it is covered in yellow poisonous dust that was used to kill all living things, because of the plague.

Ellie travelled with a Pod Fighter in the depth skies of Atlantic Ocean with her monkey, Puck, hoping to return to the Northern Colony to reconcile with her parents. However, Mal Gorman wants to conduct tests on Ellie because she has a special superhuman ability. Mal Gorman's men chase her through the golden turrets where the rich live and eventually chase her down to the shadows where the poor live. Soon she gets shot down and crashes into a river. Afterwards, despite her efforts, she fails to reconcile with her parents. In the District city of the Shadows, Mika who is Ellie's brother refuses to believe that Ellie has died, instead believing that she is still alive despite both of his parents believing that she died. He uses his memories of Ellie and discovers that the government has been hiding Ellie alive.

Many weeks later, the government introduced the Fit Campaign for Children to set standards for their long-term health. However, Mika refuses to cooperate with the Fit Mix Campaign which leads him into trouble with the Nurse and his Principal Mr. Gray. Disgusted by his behavior, Mr. Gray gave him detention, suspended him, and gave him a shock collar to wear as punishment. He also had to separate a whole big jar of small beads into their different colours. They were so small that he had to use tweezers. It was a very long process. A person named Helen comes to visit Mika from time to time and leaves biscuits for him, one of the biscuits had a message about the arcade that all the kids go to and practice flying with a pod fighter to get prizes. Many mutants go there as well and some get into the final round including Mika. He is paired with gunner Audrey who is a mutant with no eyes. Near the end all the kids that go the arcade get brainwashed and trained for war against the people on the other side of the wall. The plague was a lie that the government told them to keep them from going over the wall but, Mika and Audrey did and so did Ellie but never told anyone. The other side of the wall is where there are mansions with robot pets and animals that are owned by the few people behind the wall. Mal Gorman wants to train an army of kids to attack the people on the other side of the wall and all the kids are fit because of the fit mix. Mika and Ellie get to meet each other at the end of the story.

== Reception ==
The novel has received critical acclaim. The Roar was nominated for the Carnegie Medal 2009, won the Yorkshire Coast Book Award and was selected for the USBBY 2010 Outstanding International Books Honor List and the 2010 Texas Lone Star Reading List.

== Sequel ==
The sequel to The Roar is The Whisper, released on 1 February 2012.

== Allusions to other works ==
- The book shares several plot similarities with Orson Scott Card's Ender's Game.
- One of the minute robots made by the character Kobi is in the shape of a raven and is named Nevermore, this is a reference to Edgar Allan Poe's poem, The Raven
