= John Hornor Jacobs =

American author

- Born: January 5, 1971 (age 55); Little Rock, Arkansas, U.S.
- Education: Lyon College; Dallas Art Institute
- Occupations: Writer, novelist
- Writing career
- Genres: Fantasy, horror, science fiction
- Notable works: Southern Gods (2011), Foreign Devils (2015)
- Website: johnhornor.com

John Hornor Jacobs (born January 5, 1971) is an American author, best known for the novel Southern Gods, which began as a rough draft created through the NaNoWriMo process, and was nominated for a Bram Stoker Award for Best First Novel in 2011. His 2015 novel Foreign Devils was nominated for a David Gemmell Award for Fantasy.

== Early life ==
Jacobs was born in Little Rock, Arkansas, where he attended Little Rock Central High School.

== The Incorruptibles ==
Published in paperback by Gollancz in 2014, The Incorruptibles is a fantasy novel by Hornor. It centers on two mercenaries: Shoestring, a half-dwarf/human; and Fisk, a human. They are employed to guard a nobleman and his family as they journey along a river by paddleboat. The novel was followed by Foreign Devils in 2015.

== Reception ==
James Lovegrove, reviewing The Incorruptibles for the Financial Times, commended Jacobs' ability to "blend ... cowboys, the Roman empire and high fantasy". The Arkansas Times review praised his "wholly original and deeply imaginative voice". The Incorruptibles has also been reviewed by the British Fantasy Society, SFFWorld, and SFBook Reviews.

== Works ==
- Southern Gods (2011)
- Fierce as the Grave: A Quartet of Horror Stories (2011)
- This Dark Earth (Gallery Books, 2012)
- The Twelve-fingered Boy (2013)
- The Shibboleth (2014)
- The Incorruptibles (Gollancz, 2014)
- The Conformity (2015)
- Foreign Devils (2015)
- Infernal Machines (2017)
- The Sea Dreams It Is the Sky (2018)
- A Lush and Seething Hell (2019)
- Murder Ballads and Other Horrific Tales (2020)
- The Night That Finds Us All (2025)
