= The Law of Nines =

Novel by Terry Goodkind

- Author: Terry Goodkind
- Cover artist: Will Staehle
- Language: English
- Genre: Fantasy, speculative fiction, thriller
- Publisher: Putnam Adult
- Publication date: August 18, 2009
- Publication place: United States
- Media type: Book
- Pages: 502 (Hardcover)
- ISBN: 978-0-385-66738-8
- OCLC: 343742096

The Law of Nines is a thriller/speculative fiction novel by American author Terry Goodkind. The book was released on August 18, 2009. It debuted at #10 on the Times bestseller list.

The book, though at essence a thriller, contains numerous fantasy or science fiction elements and balances references to numerology and magic with ones to probability- and string theory. The story itself is set in a contemporary or near future setting. This reality is, however, linked to a parallel universe that seems to be a latter day incarnation of Goodkind's The Sword of Truth setting. The story revolves around the character of Alexander Rahl, an artist, whose life becomes increasingly complicated when he meets a woman named Jax who claims to have come from the other world.

== Plot summary ==
Alexander Rahl (Alex for short) is a struggling artist, living in Orden, Nebraska. His mother is committed to an asylum for violent tendencies and schizophrenia; she often claims that people are watching her through mirrors. His father died in an accident when he was young. His only other family is a grandfather named Ben, a peace-loving former special forces soldier.

Alex is en route to the local art gallery that carries his work when he meets a young woman named Jax. He is instantly fascinated with her, and saves her from a runaway truck when it nearly runs the two of them down on a street corner. Jax accompanies Alex to the gallery where she compliments him on a painting of a mountain clearing with nine trees. At the gallery, the owner urges Alex to paint more dystopian themes, like the best-selling artist at the gallery (named R.C. Dillon). Alex refuses, proclaiming that he only likes to paint real life. Alex resolves to give the painting of the mountain clearing to Jax, but before he can do so Jax disappears.

On his 27th birthday, Ben gives Alex a packet of papers and explains that it is an inheritance that passes to the oldest member of Alex's bloodline. It would have passed to his mother, but she was committed soon after her 27th birthday and so the inheritance passes to Alex. The inheritance is a huge swath of land in the far east part of the country in a heavily wooded and mountainous nature preserve. If he so chooses, he can sell it to the "Daggett Trust", which controls the rest of the nature preserve. Ben urges Alex to sell the land and live handsomely for the rest of his life on the profits. Alex agrees to think about it, and leaves.

As Alex returns to the gallery, he comes across Jax again and his adventure truly begins. Jax tries to convince Alex of the truth of her story. They discuss the meaning of the name Alexander: Saviour of Men, in relation to a prophecy stating that Alex will have to save another world; the world Jax comes from. As events unfold that open Alex's mind to all the implications Jax's story has, if true, he becomes mixed up in a battle between worlds and a massive conspiracy that he must unravel in order to save not only his own life. Alex decides to trust Jax, leading him into the adventure of a lifetime.

== Relation with the Sword of Truth series ==
When in 2007, Terry Goodkind finished his Sword of Truth series with Confessor he announced his next work The Law of Nine as "a whole new kind of high-octane thriller" and a parting from the fantasy genre. However upon its publication it became obvious that there were parallels and references to be drawn between this new book and his previous series:

- As the story progresses Jax states that she is an Amnell, which can lead to the assumption that she may also be a Confessor. Early in the book, before the revelation of her last name, Jax claims that queens used to bow to those of her kind, which in the Sword of Truth universe is true of Confessors. Jax however refers to herself as being a sorceress.
- There is a reference to a journey book that Jax uses and compares it to a cell phone. The same kind of journey book that the Sisters of the Light use.
- Reference is made to a historical/legendary leader known only as The Lord Rahl and a tale of how he created a new world without magic. Richard Rahl created such a world at the end of Confessor. Jennsen Rahl, his half-sister, willingly went to live here. Which would account for the presence of the Rahl line in this new world and could be interpreted to mean that Alex is a direct descendant of Jennsen Rahl.
- The land surrounding Alex's inheritance is controlled by the "Dagget Trust". When the character of Jensen Rahl was first introduced in The Pillars of Creation her name was Jennsen Dagget.
- Alex has several mannerisms, such as checking that his gun is loose in its holster, that mirror mannerisms Richard possesses in the Sword of Truth novels.
- There is a scene in which Jax and Alex walk into a shop that has everything to do with wizards and witches and fantasy. In that shop, Jax's eyes find a figurine of a woman with a long white dress that has a square neckline. This figure is identified by the storekeeper as "Woman of Mystery"; a woman feared, hated, respected and perceived as a figure of mercy and kindness throughout history. Such a description does match the duality of a Confessor and the dress suggest that this mysterious figurine is not just a Confessor, but in fact a Mother Confessor, as was Kahlan Amnell.
- The title of the book, Law of Nines, is referenced in Terry Goodkind's subsequent book, The Omen Machine. At one point, First Wizard Zedd says "Nine is an important trigger element. It links a number of laws of magic that have powerful influence over events. Threes are elemental in magic. Among other things, they are used in proofing magic. Threes construct nines— three threes make nine. They give nines power, help make them a Creative element."
- Alex being watched through the mirrors is exactly what happens in The Omen Machine to Richard and Kahlan. "Zedd lifted an eyebrow and fixed the man in the meaningful gaze. “There are those, I hear tell, who have the ability to use dark forms of magic to gaze through mirrors into another place.”"
- The place Alex lives is Orden, Nebraska. One might recall the Boxes of Orden from the Sword of Truth Series.

== Reception ==
Tina Jordan of Entertainment Weekly expected the book to appeal to both fantasy and thriller fans alike. She predicted that if a sequel is written it will, however, take place in a fantasy setting. Lindsey Losnedahl of the Las Vegas Review-Journal claimed that the book is more a sequel to the Sword of Truth series than a completely new direction. "But I’m still waiting to see what Goodkind can do outside of the Rahl world, maybe 'The Law of Nines' is just a small step in getting there."
