= Debt of Bones =

1998 fantasy novel by Terry Goodkind

- Author: Terry Goodkind
- Language: English
- Series: The Sword of Truth
- Genre: Epic fantasy
- Publisher: Gollancz
- Publication date: August 1998 (in compilation) then December 2001 (by itself)
- Publication place: United States
- Media type: Print (Hardback)
- Pages: 128
- ISBN: 0-575-07256-3
- OCLC: 46847682
- Dewey Decimal: 813/.54 21
- LC Class: PS3557.O5826 D43 2001
- Preceded by: The First Confessor: The Legend of Magda Searus
- Followed by: Wizard's First Rule

Debt of Bones is a short novel by Terry Goodkind, first published in the August 1998 anthology Legends. It was later published as a stand-alone book in hardcover in 2001, and in paperback in 2004.

The book functions as a prequel to the Sword of Truth series. It served as the inspiration for the television series Legend of the Seeker.

== Plot summary ==
During the war against D'Hara, a young peasant woman named Abby meets with Zeddicus Zu'l Zorander, Wizard of the First Order, the most powerful man in all the land. The young woman demands that Zedd pay a debt of bones that is owed to her according to an ancient agreement. Abby needs the bones in order to save her dying child, however Zedd cannot fulfill this request without forsaking his duties as a wizard. Abby and Zedd end up in a desperate fight to save a child's life, all in the middle of a raging war in which Zedd is a key leader. On their quest, they ultimately initiate the series of events leading up to the end of the war with D'Hara and the division of the Westlands, Midlands, and D'Hara by the boundaries.

== Characters in "Debt of Bones" ==
- Zeddicus Zu'l Zorander
- Panis Rahl
- Abby
- Philip
- Jana
- Mariska
- Delora
- Anargo

== See also ==
- Dragonlance
- The Wheel of Time
- A Song of Ice and Fire
