= Phantom (Sword of Truth) =

2006 fantasy novel by Terry Goodkind

- Author: Terry Goodkind
- Cover artist: Keith Parkinson
- Language: English
- Series: The Sword of Truth
- Genre: Epic fantasy
- Publisher: Tor Fantasy
- Publication date: July 2006
- Publication place: United States
- Media type: Print (Hardback)
- Pages: 672
- ISBN: 0-7653-0524-0
- OCLC: 67840246
- Dewey Decimal: 813/.54 22
- LC Class: PS3557.O5826 P44 2006
- Preceded by: Chainfire
- Followed by: Confessor

Phantom is the tenth book in Terry Goodkind's epic fantasy series The Sword of Truth, and the second in the trilogy. It was published in 2006 by Tor Books and preceded by the Chainfire. Phantom debuted in the #1 spot on The New York Times and Publishers Weekly bestseller lists.

== Plot ==
The story continues with Richard's quest to find his wife, Kahlan, and release her from the Chainfire spell. Kahlan still travels with the Sisters of the Dark Ulicia, Cecilia and Armina as they hurry to catch up with the fourth Sister, Tovi. Unbeknownst to them, Tovi is dead, stabbed by Samuel and allowed to die after being questioned by Nicci. They stop at the White Horse Inn, and the Sisters are shocked when the innkeeper can see Kahlan and correctly title her. Because of the Chainfire enacted on Kahlan, no one should be able to know she exists. She was erased from the memories of all who knew her and anyone who sees her instantly forgets. The Sisters kill the man and his family, and continue on, traveling toward Caska where they believe Tovi has gone.

Back at the Wizard's Keep, Richard senses powerful magic and goes to investigate. He discovers Zedd, Ann and Nathan in a room where Nicci is caught up in the grips of a powerful spell called a verification web. The web is meant to examine the Chainfire spell and see if there is any way to undo it. Richard realizes that there is something wrong with the spell, recognizing that the corruption of the spell was caused by the presence of the three chimes - Reechani, Sentrosi, Vasi - being in the world, and the chimes not only corrupted the verification web, but they have corrupted all magic, including the Chainfire spell. Despite the other three's refusal of his analysis, he is able to disable the spell to release Nicci before the spell kills her. Before Nicci can tell anyone that the spell was indeed corrupted, the deadly beast that Jagang had created to hunt Richard appears in the room. In order to drive it off, Nicci places herself back into the spell form to draw upon the power between life and death. By refusing to actually supply the magic to the spell, the power of life and the power of the underworld come together and strike the beast, driving it away for the time being. Richard saves her from the spell a second time.

Shota arrives at the Keep, bringing Jebra in an attempt to make Richard believe that he is wasting his time trying to find Kahlan when there is a whole world that needs to be saved from the Imperial Order. To that end, she instructs Jebra to testify to the horrific terrors that had befallen the people of Ebissinia. Shota reveals that Samuel was under the control of another witch woman, Six. Richard says that he understands the situations, but Shota remains unconvinced and touches him with her power, opening his mind to see a vision that places Richard in the position of the slaughtered men of Ebissinia, who are condemned to death while listening to the vulgar promises of what the soldiers will do to their wives. In this dream-like reality, Richard sees Kahlan begging for his life and they profess their love for each other.

As Nicci and Shota have a minor confrontation, Richard realizes that Shota is right. Despite how important Kahlan's life is to him, it is only one life, while the whole of the New World is threatened by the Order. Pleased, Shota gives Richard a prediction she has had from the flow of time. Long ago, the First Wizard Barracus went to the Temple of the Winds to ensure that someone with the Subtractive side of the gift would be born again. After Barracus came back from the temple, he threw himself out his window, but not before he left a special book for Richard. Before Shota leaves, she gives him one last cryptic message: His mother was not the only one to die in the fire that claimed her life.

After such events, Richard comes to understand that he was right all along when he earlier stated that it is impossible to fight the hordes of Imperial Order forces head on in one great final battle. Richard, Nicci and Cara travel in the Sliph to the main army in D'Hara and explain to the commanders what he has come to understand and his position. Richard issues a command that the army be broken up into smaller units, stating that if the Old World wants war, then they shall have it. The tactic being that while the Imperial Order is here in the New World, they shall become the Phantom D'Haran Legion, bringing death and destruction to the Old World. The death and destruction will be an endless reminder of what will happen to those who support the Order. He orders the troops to kill anyone who opposes them, burn crops, and bring him the ears of anyone who preaches the beliefs of the Order. His troops destroy entire garrisons of troops, impaling their heads on stakes, skin bureaucrats of the empire alive and impale them on stakes, and follow the strategy of slash-and-burn warfare to starve the men, women and children of the empire.

The three Sisters of the Dark and Kahlan follow Sister Tovi's trail to Caska, where they are surprised to find not Tovi (who has been dead since the end of the previous book), but Jagang waiting for them. Jagang once again proves that he is a master strategist by revealing that he had never left the Sisters of the Dark's minds and that by tricking them into thinking their fake bond with Richard was working, he learned much from their quest. He also captures Kahlan, him being able to see her because he was linked to the Dark Sister when they performed the Chainfire spell on Kahlan, and was therefore unaffected by it. Meanwhile, while traveling back to the Wizard's Keep through the Sliph, Richard is attacked by Jagang's beast and magic conjured by the previously thought to be dead Princess Violet (now Queen Violet at Six's instruction), causing him to become separated from his power. The Sliph instigates "emergency measures" instilled in her thousands of years ago by First Wizard Barracus and shunts Richard to an emergency escape portal somewhere in the wilds close to the land of the Night Wisps. Richard must pass a test Barracus left for him before the Sliph will tell him why he needs to see the Night Wisps. After a brief visit to the land of the Night Wisps to recover a secret book left by the War Wizard Barracus (who left the outfit and ruby pendant), Secrets of a War Wizard's Power. Richard is captured by Six and taken to Tamarang. There, he hides Secrets of a War Wizard's Power in the room that he was tortured in during Wizard's First Rule, deciding that regardless of what happens to him, he cannot let anyone find the book that Barracus hid for 3000 years for him. While being taken to Violet, Richard attempts an escape killing dozens of Imperial Order soldiers. The commanding officer is impressed with his skill and takes Richard away as a captive to become a player of Ja'La dh Jin (Game of Life) on his division's team.

The division of the Imperial Order rejoins the main forces, now laying siege on the People's Palace. Richard catches a glimpse of Kahlan as he is taken into the camp and revives her will to fight on and remember her past. Back at the Wizard's Keep, while discussing Richard's desire to save Kahlan, Zedd states that even though Richard is trying hard, Kahlan is as good as dead. The Chainfire spell put in place over her destroys memories, not just overlap them or bury them; Kahlan will never remember any of them, even Richard, ever again. Nicci has a revelation about the all-important Prophecies that Richard must lead them in the final battle and puts one of the Boxes of Orden in play in Richard's name, so that not only the Sisters of the Dark have superiority in that matter.

The book ends with a few major cliffhangers: Richard is a captive in the Imperial Order's main camp, without his sword or his gift; Kahlan is a captive of Jagang with a Rada'han; the Boxes of Orden are in play by Nicci; there is a problem with Chainfire and with magic; that the Imperial Order is slowly making their way into the central stronghold of the D'Haran forces: the People's Palace, but also the D'Haran forces appear able to cut off the Imperial Order supply lines just as winter starts.

=== Wizard's Tenth Rule ===
Each of the novels in the Sword of Truth series reveals a "Wizard's Rule" — a magical principle that allows Wizards to be savvy manipulators of the world around them. The novel reveals the Wizard's Tenth Rule:

Willfully turning aside from the truth is treason to one's self.

— p. 12, U.S. hardcover edition

== Publication and reception ==
Following the hit sales of the other books in the Sword of Truth series, Tor ran 500,000 copies in Phantom's first printing. The author pre-signed 10,000 copies of the book before the release.

== See also ==
- Dragonlance
- The Wheel of Time
- A Song of Ice and Fire
