= Soul of the Fire =

1999 fantasy novel by Terry Goodkind

- Author: Terry Goodkind
- Cover artist: Keith Parkinson Kahlan and Richard
- Language: English
- Series: The Sword of Truth
- Genre: Epic fantasy
- Publisher: Tor Fantasy
- Publication date: April 1999
- Publication place: United States
- Media type: Print (Hardback)
- Pages: 512
- ISBN: 0-312-89054-0
- OCLC: 40545453
- Dewey Decimal: 813/.54 21
- LC Class: PS3557.O5826 S68 1999
- Preceded by: Temple of the Winds
- Followed by: Faith of the Fallen

Soul of the Fire is the fifth book in Terry Goodkind's epic fantasy series The Sword of Truth. It was published in 1999 by Tor Books and preceded by Temple of the Winds.

== Plot ==
Richard and Kahlan are finally married and are enjoying their wedding night back in the Spirit house in the Village of the Mud People. Soon, sudden and unexplainable deaths begin to occur, and Richard comes to the conclusion that when Kahlan called forth "the chimes" in order to save him, they remained free, causing havoc. Zedd sends Richard and Kahlan off to the Wizard's Keep in Aydindril to get a special bottle that contains a spell that will stop the threat.

While en route, Richard, Kahlan, and their Mord-Sith protector Cara are sidetracked into dealing with the people of Anderith, who have a powerful weapon of mass destruction called the Dominie Dirtch. They find that the leadership of Anderith wishes to surrender to the Imperial Order rather than surrender to the D'Haran Empire. As Richard tries his best to convince the people of Anderith of the danger the Imperial Order poses, he becomes firmly convinced that the chimes are loose.

=== Plot summary ===
Continuing on from Temple of the Winds, the story begins after Richard and Kahlan's wedding in the village of the Mud People. Strange deaths and the appearance of a 'chicken-that-isn't-a-chicken' leaves Richard fearing the worst. Zedd confides in Richard that the chicken is a Lurk sent by Emperor Jagang's Sisters of the Dark. According to Zedd, the only way to destroy the Lurk is by smashing a bottle from the Wizard's Keep in Aydindril with the Sword of Truth.

However, Zedd is actually lying. He has surmised that a terrible magic known as "the chimes" has been accidentally released by Kahlan in her attempt to cure Richard. The chimes will eventually drain all magic from the world of the living, beginning with the additive magic. This would cause death to beings that require magic and possibly cause the destruction of the world if additive magic were to completely fail. Zedd determines that he must find a remedy, and wants Richard and Kahlan safely out of the way while he does so.

Richard, Kahlan and Cara, unaware of the truth, set out to accomplish the task of breaking the bottle. Meanwhile, Zedd and Ann set off in separate ways. Zedd recalls some lore that relates the chimes to Anderith and he travels there to attempt to banish the chimes. Ann infiltrates the Imperial Order in order to save the Sisters of the Light under Jagang's enslavement. However, the Sisters of the Light betray Ann to Jagang because they fear the wrath of Emperor Jagang, causing Ann to be captured.

Elsewhere, there are Machiavellian politics of Anderith to worry about. Both the Anders, black-haired people who govern the city, and the Hakens, red-haired people under the boot of Ander oppression, occupy Anderith. From an early age, Hakens are kept under control and disrespected by the Anders and are taught that this oppression is a necessity to protect the Hakens from their violent ancestral ways. Most Hakens have bought into this idea and willingly subject themselves to the oppression.

Anderith is being wooed by the Imperial Order in the person of Stein, who personifies the savage ruthlessness of Jagang's empire. Stein offers double the going rate for any goods that merchants, all of the Ander race, will sell to the Imperial Order. He also plots with the minister of culture, Bertrand Chanboor, to surrender Anderith to the Order. They begin infiltrating Imperial Order soldiers into Anderith under the guise of Special Anderian Troops.

Dalton Campbell, aide to the minister of culture, has a hand in most events within the Anderith nation. He uses his connections, along with his squad of messengers, to accomplish underhanded tasks to ensure that the minister will ascend to the chair of Sovereign (a religious position similar to the real-world pope) when the present one passes on. Dalton treasures his wife Teresa above all else.

A kitchen scullion, Fitch, is recruited into the messenger corps by Dalton. Though he has conflicting goals and values, Fitch's gratitude towards Dalton results in blind obedience and he smothers his conscience to accomplish Dalton's bidding. Ultimately, Dalton betrays Fitch, who is forced to flee. Fitch determines to redeem himself by becoming the Seeker of Truth, a longtime fantasy of his. The first step to becoming Seeker is to obtain the Sword of Truth.

The Anderith Army is seriously under-trained and little more than children. They guard the Dominie Dirtch, a defensive line of giant bell-shaped structures, seemingly made from a solid piece of dark-veined stone, which kill anything in front of them when struck.

Elsewhere, Richard realizes the chimes are, in fact, loose. Because of this, he sends Cara to Aydindril to retrieve the Sword of Truth while he, Kahlan and Du Chaillu, about to deliver her child, head to Anderith to banish the chimes. Richard also deduces that the army of the Imperial Order is marching on Anderith. If the Imperial Order conquers Anderith, it will be a continuing imminent threat to the rest of the Midlands. Arriving in Anderith first, Zedd attempts to banish the chimes by offering them his soul. This is the cause of the chimes' presence: they don't have souls, and when Kahlan summoned them she inadvertently promised them Richard's soul. However, it is not Zedd's soul the chimes want. When Zedd's attempt fails, he undergoes a transformation, becoming a raven.

Richard and Kahlan arrive in Anderith and set out to look for the chimes, but they also work on joining Anderith with the D'Haran Empire. Word spreads and a vote is taken. While Richard makes a good plea to the people of Anderith, Dalton Campbell's interference sways the vote, leaving Richard defeated. At the same time, Kahlan struggles with the knowledge that she is with child, and the trouble that will come because of it.

Meanwhile, Ann finds the captive Sisters of the Light and persuades them to come with her. Since magic is failing, Jagang's abilities as a Dream Walker are null, and Ann informs the Sisters of a bond to Richard, the Lord Rahl, that can keep them safe from the Dream Walker. However, the Sisters, fearful of retribution by Jagang, betray Ann to the Imperial Order. She is left in her tent by herself when Sister Alessandra, a Sister of the Dark, begins visiting her and bringing her food. She attempts to sway Alessandra, at first to no avail but with success in the end.

Dalton Campbell, along with help from a Sister of the Dark, sets a group of his messengers on Kahlan when she is off by herself pondering on whether or not to keep Richard's child. She is beaten nearly to death, but she is saved by Richard, who at first doesn't recognize her. When he finally does, however, he realizes that he will be unable to heal her unless he manages to banish the chimes first.

Cara almost obtains the Sword of Truth, but is beaten to it by Fitch and his friend, Morley. A combination of sheer dumb luck and the fact that the Chimes have deactivated the Wizards' Keep defenses and killed many of its guards allow Fitch and his accomplice to easily obtain the Sword. Cara gives chase and kills the friend before chasing Fitch back to Anderith. When she catches him at the Dominie Dirtch, she loses the sword when Imperial Order scouts attack. The Order's soldiers collect the sword as a prize for Stein to present to Emperor Jagang.

Around this time, Dalton Campbell manages to murder the Sovereign, instead of waiting for the feeble figurehead to pass naturally. This immediately pushes Bertrand Chanboor to the rank of Sovereign. The empowered Chanboor consummates his promotion by sleeping with Dalton's wife, Teresa. Dalton pretends not to be disturbed by this betrayal and even seemingly "joins" the web of infidelity by sleeping with both Teresa and Chanboor's wife in turn, intentionally having contracted a lethal STD first. Campbell finalizes his revenge by killing the Imperial Order emissary, Stein (who had "shared" Teresa with Chanboor), gaining possession of the Sword of Truth in turn.

Having studied the actions of Joseph Ander, the ancient founder of Anderith, Richard comes to realize that the chimes and the Dominie Dirtch are connected. More specifically, he comes to understand that Joseph Ander enslaved the Chimes using them to power the Dominie Dirtch. Richard finally comes to understand that by using art as a form of intent, he can alter the Grace and create a new pathway for magic. Thus Richard counters the magic Ander used to enslave the Chimes and calls them forth giving the chimes a choice: His soul (which they were promised by Kahlan) or revenge on the spirit of Ander for enslaving them. The chimes choose vengeance, taking Ander to the underworld. Once he is successful in banishing the chimes, Richard sets off to heal Kahlan but is stopped by Du Chaillu, just having given birth, who tells him that his healing powers would kill her due to a hidden subtractive magic spell that has been placed within her.

Alessandra eventually frees Ann, reverts her faith back to the Creator and gives her oath to Richard. The pair soon sets off out of Anderith. When Zedd's soul is returned to his body with the banishment of the chimes, he also departs. Richard decides to leave for Westland, where he plans to let Kahlan recover from her wounds naturally. Dalton Campbell sees them off with his apologies and informs Richard that Campbell, Chanboor, and both of their wives have become stricken with an "unfortunate", incurable venereal disease and have doomed themselves to a slow, agonizing demise. He returns the Sword of Truth to Richard before they set off. Richard claims he will wait in Westland until the people of the world can prove to him that they truly desire freedom. As they depart, they pass a group of people set to welcome the Order, planning to sway them with peaceful protest. As they leave, the Order begins to sack the city, and the screams of the women being forced into sexual slavery follow them into the night.

=== Wizard's Fifth Rule ===
Each of the novels in the Sword of Truth series reveals a "Wizard's Rule" — a magical principle that allows Wizards to be savvy manipulators of the world around them. The novel reveals the Wizard's Fifth Rule:

Mind what people do, not only what they say, for deeds will betray a lie.

— Chapter 28, p. 205, U.S. hardcover edition

It is explained in the novel as follows: "People will lie to deceive you from what they truly mean to do. Watching the actions they take will prove their true intentions."

== See also ==
- Dragonlance
- The Wheel of Time
- A Song of Ice and Fire
