= Warheart =

2015 fantasy novel by Terry Goodkind

- First edition
- Author: Terry Goodkind
- Language: English
- Series: The Sword of Truth
- Genre: Epic fantasy novel
- Publisher: Tor Books
- Publication date: November 17, 2015
- Publication place: United States
- Media type: Print (hardcover)
- Preceded by: Severed Souls
- Followed by: --

Warheart is the eighteenth book in Terry Goodkind's epic fantasy series The Sword of Truth. It is the fourth novel in Richard and Kahlan series, which begins right after the end of the original Sword of Truth series. It was published in 2015 by Tor Books and preceded by Severed Souls.

== See also ==
- Dragonlance
- The Wheel of Time
- A Song of Ice and Fire
