= Faith of the Fallen =

2000 fantasy novel by Terry Goodkind

- Author: Terry Goodkind
- Cover artist: Keith Parkinson
- Language: English
- Series: The Sword of Truth
- Genre: Epic fantasy
- Publisher: Tor Fantasy
- Publication date: August 2000
- Publication place: United States
- Media type: Print (Hardback)
- Pages: 800
- ISBN: 0-312-86786-7
- OCLC: 44046729
- Dewey Decimal: 813/.54 21
- LC Class: PS3557.O5826 F35 2000
- Preceded by: Soul of the Fire
- Followed by: The Pillars of Creation

Faith of the Fallen is the sixth book in Terry Goodkind's epic fantasy series The Sword of Truth. It was published in 2000 by Tor Books and preceded by the Soul of the Fire.

== Plot ==
The Imperial Order continues to bring an undesired war upon the New World. Its mission is to enslave the world in a system in which no human being can aspire to anything more than mediocrity. Meanwhile, Richard, Cara and Kahlan return to Westland. Richard believes that if he leads the armies of the New World directly into a confrontation with the armies of the Imperial Order, he will lose the battle and the New World will fall prey to the grasp of death and slavery.

Kahlan is nursed back to health after a brutal beating she received at the hands of Anderith's messengers at the end of the last book, Soul of the Fire. Just as she achieves her recovery, Nicci, a long time slave of Jagang and the Imperial Order, arrives to take Richard away.

Kahlan and Cara pack their things and decide to return to the D'Haran armies. There they, too, will battle with the Imperial Order.

=== Plot summary ===
Faith of the Fallen begins where Soul of the Fire leaves off. Richard is taking Cara and injured Kahlan to the high mountains of his homeland, Westland. At the end of the Soul of the Fire Richard realizes that he cannot win against Emperor Jagang until the people themselves want to fight for freedom. Because of this mindset Richard isolates himself in the woods, to allow Kahlan time to heal, and refuses to give orders to the D'Haran army. After Kahlan has made a significant recovery, Nicci arrives and captures Kahlan by using a maternity spell, linking herself to Kahlan and enabling herself to kill Kahlan at any time. Richard is forced to go with Nicci into the Old World, leaving Kahlan, Cara, and the Sword of Truth to rejoin the D'Haran army.

Shortly afterward, Prelate Ann and the reformed Sister of the Dark Alessandra visit the camp, looking for Richard, claiming his need for the people to prove their worth is pointless and that the prophecy dictates his required actions. This enrages Kahlan, and she threatens to murder Alessandra unless Ann destroys her journey book, which will prevent her from coordinating with Verna and the D'haran army. Kahlan and Cara, despite knowing Richard's objections, leave the Upper Ven in search of help from Zedd and Sister Verna. Seeing the plight of her troops fighting against the Order, Kahlan takes command of the combined armies of D'Hara and the Midlands in a desperate attempt to halt the Order's advance into the New World.

Following Nicci, Richard is put to work in the Old World capital of Altur'Rang, finding work as a delivery man of steel and timber for construction, as Nicci's only requirement is that he care for her and himself, expecting the conditions of life among the poor will crush Richard's spirits. Richard also meets Brother Narev, a sorcerer who is constructing a spellform for the Imperial Palace that will effectively make Emperor Jagang immortal. As Richard becomes successful and relatively happy, even turning around the deplorable conditions of the neighborhood despite the conditions, Nicci begins to doubt her position, and finds she is viciously hated by her neighbors for her treatment of Richard. She attempts to seduce Richard but fails, and gives herself to a local thug, Gadi, who brutally assaults her, thinking that Kahlan will believe Richard finally fell for her charms. Richard is approached to lead a peaceful protest against the Order but he refuses and begs his friends to stay away, knowing it will be a wholesale slaughter. Hundreds are killed, and hundreds more are hung and tortured. Richard is eventually turned in by Gadi as a collaborator. Nicci spends a fortune in gold she finds Richard has hidden to set him free, finding he has been severely beaten.

Richard, as punishment for his "civil infraction," is commanded to erect a disgusting sculpture glorifying human suffering for the center of the New Palace. Secretly, Richard works tirelessly to create his own statue of a noble man and woman out of a block of flawed marble he purchases from a local quarryman. It is of such beauty that a huge procession is led through the city to view it.

Brother Narev, when he finally arrives to see the statue, orders Richard to destroy it. Richard takes up the hammer and points to the crowd, telling them that the Order only wishes to destroy beauty, only wishes to enslave humanity under the doctrine of faith unsupported by the true value of life. He swings the hammer and shatters the statue in one blast. The people are outraged, and immediately revolt, proclaiming that the Order will not enslave them any longer. They attack the Imperial Order, and Altur'Rang falls to the hands of the rebels. Richard finds a group of his friends overseeing the execution of the Order governing council.

After fighting many battles against the Imperial Order, overseeing the wedding of Verna to the Wizard Warren, the subsequent death of Warren at the hands of Gadi, Kahlan and Cara leave to find Richard, learning from Gadi's interrogation that he is in Altur'Rang. They enter Altur'Rang in time to see the statue's destruction. As the rebellion begins, Richard enters the palace to find Brother Narev. While working his way through the dark corridors, he encounters Kahlan, the Sword of Truth over her shoulder. He attacks her and engineers the fight so that Kahlan runs him through. This forces Nicci to choose - to sever the maternity spell and save him or let him die and continue serving the Order. Nicci, wholeheartedly converted to Richard's cause after seeing his sculpture, removes the maternity bond to Kahlan and heals Richard. Altur'Rang is free, for a time, from the grasp of the Order, and the people have found a determination not to serve the system as slaves. The epilogue ends with Kahlan shyly staring at a massive statue of Spirit, a model Richard had carved with her face, being erected in the center of the newly free Altur'Rang

=== Wizard's Sixth Rule ===
Each of the novels in the Sword of Truth series reveals a "Wizard's Rule" — a magical principle that allows Wizards to be savvy manipulators of the world around them. The novel reveals the Wizard's Sixth Rule:

The only sovereign you can allow to rule you is reason.

— p. 319, U.S. hardcover edition

It is explained in the novel as follows: "The first law of reason is this: what exists, exists, what is, is and from this irreducible bedrock principle, all knowledge is built. It is the foundation from which life is embraced. Thinking is a choice. Wishes and whims are not facts nor are they a means to discover them. Reason is our only way of grasping reality; it is our basic tool of survival. We are free to evade the effort of thinking, to reject reason, but we are not free to avoid the penalty of the abyss that we refuse to see. Faith and feelings are the darkness to reason's light. In rejecting reason, refusing to think, one embraces death."

== Reception ==
Don D'Ammassa of the Science Fiction Chronicle wrote that Goodkind has "developed some of the most thoroughly realized characters in the genre." Publishers Weekly wrote: "For sheer volume of its Technicolor bloodbaths and its bathetic propagandistic bombast, this installment of Goodkind's fantasy saga makes an indelible impact; anyone who yearns for Goodkind is going to be in high clover." Andrea Watson of the Publishers Weekly opined that while the novel is a "good read", Goodkind "should start to wind up his plotlines and move on to his next project."

== See also ==
- Dragonlance
- The Wheel of Time
- A Song of Ice and Fire
