= Stone of Tears =

1996 fantasy novel by Terry Goodkind

- Author: Terry Goodkind
- Cover artist: Keith Parkinson
- Language: English
- Series: The Sword of Truth
- Genre: Epic fantasy
- Publisher: Tor Fantasy
- Publication date: June 1996
- Publication place: United States
- Media type: Print (Hardback)
- Pages: 979; 982 (pocket edition)
- ISBN: 0-312-85706-3
- OCLC: 32698428
- Dewey Decimal: 813/.54 20
- LC Class: PS3557.O5826 S76 1995
- Preceded by: Wizard's First Rule
- Followed by: Blood of the Fold

Stone Of Tears is the second book in Terry Goodkind's epic fantasy series The Sword of Truth. It was published in 1996 by Tor Books and preceded by the Wizard's First Rule.

== Plot summary ==
After the death of Darken Rahl and planning his wedding to Kahlan, Richard is afflicted by a series of painful headaches. He also learns from Shota that he is the bastard son of Darken Rahl and the grandson of Zeddicus Zu'l Zorander.

Richard gets a visit from three Sisters of the Light, who inform him that his headaches are caused by the awakening of the gift within him and are fatal and unstoppable, unless he receives magical training. The Sisters tell him that he must go with them and wear a Rada'Han, a magical collar, in order to control his headaches and the gift. They also explain that they will offer him their help three times, and, if he refuses each time, they will not be able to help him ever again. Richard refuses twice, and each time a Sister commits suicide.

Seeking guidance on how to repair the veil, Richard and Kahlan request another "gathering"; this involves turning to the "ancestors' spirits" for help. But instead of being able to speak to the spirits, Richard and Kahlan are sent down to the underworld and are placed face-to-face with Darken Rahl. Rahl touches Richard with the Keeper's mark, making him unconscious and lets Kahlan know that Richard is only minutes away from death.

As Kahlan desperately tries to save Richard, a glowing spirit emerges, Denna, who tells Kahlan that she has to force Richard into wearing the collar; if he does not, the headaches will kill him and everything will be lost. Denna then takes Richard's mark, and is sent down to the underworld and the Keeper. As the third and final Sister returns, Kahlan tells Richard that he has to put on the collar. When he tries to explain his reluctance, Kahlan makes him believe that the only way to prove his love for her is to wear it. Richard reluctantly agrees to wear the collar and the sister reveals to them that the third reason for wearing the collar is to inflict pain on the wearer. He leaves, telling her merely to find Zedd. Devastated, Richard submits to the remaining Sister, and leaves with her to go to the Palace of Prophets.

Richard travels with Sister Verna to the Palace of the Prophets, which is located in the Old World. Along the way, they pass between the Barrier, and Richard is drawn to one of the black towers, and is compelled to collect some of the black sand he finds. Later, he is instructed to execute a captive woman as tribute to pass through tribal land, but refuses and chooses to free the woman instead, who promises to take them through the Baku Ban Mana lands. Despite a promise of safe passage, she forces Richard into a battle with thirty Baka Ban Mana blademasters as their oath dictates. Richard slaughters them by tapping in the Sword of Truth's collective knowledge of blade fighting. Killing them all, he is bound to marry the priestess, and Richard gives her his magic whistle of the Bird Man to attack the neighboring tribes' crops and force a peace between them.

Arriving at the Palace of the Prophets, Richard threatens to kill anyone who prevents him from leaving, stating he is a prisoner, not a guest or a student. However, Richard is treated lavishly, and given absurd amounts of gold, which are symbols of his status as a novice wizard, designed to make him not see value in personal wealth. Rather, he uses the money to bribe the entire staff of the Palace to his service, even hiring a brothel on retainer to service the guards. He discovers he is a war wizard: one who has the gift of both additive and subtractive magic. Later, he learns from Nathan Rahl, another wizard in the Palace of the Prophets and Richard's ancient ancestor, that he is the first to be born with such power in three thousand years. It is revealed that the Prelate brought Richard to the Palace to flush out the Sisters of the Dark, a secret society within the Sisters of the Light dedicated to the task of unleashing the Keeper into the world of the living.

Kahlan embarks on a long trek back to her home of Aydindril along with three mud people. Along the way, they come across a sacked city, Ebinissia, with the inhabitants' corpses filling the streets and the surrounding countryside. Kahlan and the three mud people race to catch up with a band of some five thousand troops that are trailing the enemy which sacked Ebinissia. She is shocked to realize that these soldiers are all teenagers and entirely undertrained and unprepared to attack the seasoned, well organized and vastly superior enemy forces. She assumes command of the army and organizes a series of guerilla attacks on what she now knows to be The Imperial Order. Victorious, Kahlan returns to Ayndindril, where she stumbles across Zedd and the sorceress Adie, both of whom had their memories deleted earlier. She returns his memory by telling him that Richard is with the Sisters of the Light. Enraged, Zedd tells Kahlan he will have her beheaded for what she has done, and that she has condemned Richard to a thousand years of his literal nightmares.

After months at the Palace, Richard escapes after killing several Sisters of the Dark. Knowing he must save the world first, he travels to D'hara. At the Peoples Palace, Richard destroys a spell from a Sister of the Dark by using the black sorcerer's sand to corrupt the spell. He then avoids making a last moment mistake by placing the Stone of Tears on Darken Rahl. Richard returns the Stone of Tears to the underworld and once again defeats the Keeper, he rushes to Aydindril to find Kahlan. Upon finding Kahlan has already been executed, Richard kills all the councillors who sentenced her to death. Finding Kahlan's grave, he realizes that Zedd has cast a death spell to make all believe that Kahlan is dead. Denna's spirit visited the both of them and they were reunited in a place between worlds.

=== Wizard's Second Rule ===
Each of the novels in the Sword of Truth series reveals a "Wizard's Rule" — a magical principle that allows Wizards to be savvy manipulators of the world around them. The novel reveals the Wizard's Second Rule:

The greatest harm can result from the best intentions.

— Chapter 63, p. 634, U.S. hardcover edition

It is explained in the book as follows: "It sounds a paradox, but kindness and good intentions can be an insidious path to destruction. Sometimes doing what seems right is wrong, and can cause harm. The only counter to it is knowledge, wisdom, forethought, and understanding the First Rule. Even then, that is not always enough. [...] Violation can cause anything from discomfort, to disaster, to death."

== See also ==
- Dragonlance
- The Wheel of Time
- A Song of Ice and Fire
