= Chainfire =

2005 fantasy novel by Terry Goodkind

- Author: Terry Goodkind
- Cover artist: Keith Parkinson
- Language: English
- Series: The Sword of Truth
- Genre: Epic fantasy
- Publisher: Tor Fantasy
- Publication date: January 2005
- Publication place: United States
- Media type: Print (Hardback)
- Pages: 672
- ISBN: 0-7653-0523-2
- OCLC: 57313436
- Dewey Decimal: 813/.54 22
- LC Class: PS3557.O5826 C48 2005
- Preceded by: Naked Empire
- Followed by: Phantom

Chainfire is the ninth book in Terry Goodkind's epic fantasy series The Sword of Truth, and the first in a trilogy set. It was published in 2005 by Tor Books and preceded by the Naked Empire. In 2006, it was nominated for the Prometheus Award.

== Plot ==
Richard Rahl is the ruler of the D'Haran Empire, a collection of nations previously made up of D'Hara and the Midlands. Richard Rahl and the D'Haran Empire are currently locked in an epic struggle with the Imperial Order, an Empire from the Old World, led by Emperor Jagang.

Chainfire continues the story of Richard in his attempt to teach the people that their lives are theirs alone, and that they can be free of the Imperial Order. Richard is gravely injured from an enemy's arrow. He is brought to Nicci, a sorceress and former Sister of the Dark, who heals him using Subtractive Magic; this causes unforeseen events to spiral out of control. When Richard awakens, he discovers that his wife, Kahlan Amnell, the Mother Confessor, is missing. Furthermore, no one around him seems to remember her. Nicci and Cara both attribute Richard's memory of Kahlan to dreams and delusions brought on by his injury and possibly an unintended effect of the Subtractive Magic used in healing Richard. Despite Richard's attempts to explain the events of the last several years could not have happened without Kahlan, the paradoxes are explained away as Richard remembering things inaccurately.

Fearing for Kahlan's life, Richard desperately tries to find some trace of her and at the same time convince the others that she exists. His search leads him to the witch woman, Shota, who reveals "that which you seek is long buried with the bones". In return for more information, Shota demands the Sword of Truth, which Richard relinquishes to her pet, Samuel, the previous bearer of the sword. Shota then utters the words "Chainfire" and "The Deep Nothing" and tells Richard to "beware the four-headed viper". She also warns Richard of a "blood beast" conjured by several wizards and Sisters of the Dark, under the orders of Jagang. The beast is meant to kill Richard and is as unstoppable as it is unpredictable. Further, the beast is able to track Richard when he uses his gift because of the way Nicci healed his arrow wound.

In the meantime, Ann and Nathan together have discovered many blank pages in books of ancient prophecy. They seem to remember that the pages should not be blank but cannot remember what was originally written there. Zedd makes the same discovery independently.

Leaving Agaden Reach, Richard makes his way to the Wizard's Keep to find Zedd, but he also has no memory of Kahlan. Nicci arrives simultaneously. To prove Kahlan's existence, Richard exhumes her grave and is shocked to find a corpse in the buried casket with a nametag attached to her dress. He is devastated and falls into a deep depression. Meanwhile, Ann, Nathan, and Frederich also arrive at the Keep. Desperate to get their "Richard" back so that he will "fulfill prophecy" and lead the D'Haran army against the forces of Emperor Jagang. Zedd, Nathan, and Ann attempt to coerce Nicci into secretly using Subtractive Magic to delete Richard's "delusions"; Nicci instead begs Richard to persevere in his beliefs. Together with Cara, they head to the Sliph to travel to the People's Palace.

Richard learns that the Sliph knows of a place called the Deep Nothing. The Sliph takes them to some ruins called "Caska" in the Deep Nothing. Upon arriving, they find themselves in the midst of a group of Imperial Order advanced scouts who have captured a girl named Jillian, part of a people called the "Dream Casters". While Nicci eliminates the rest of the Imperial Troops scouts, Richard and Jillian look for answers in the catacombs. Together, they find a hidden passage that leads to a protected library. In the library, Jillian discovers a book titled Chainfire.

At the same time, the reader learns that Kahlan indeed exists, and has been kidnapped by the four remaining Sisters of the Dark who escaped the Dream Walker in Blood of the Fold. The Sisters have cast a spell called Chainfire, using Subtractive Magic to erase people's memories of Kahlan and Kahlan's memories of herself. The Sisters then use Kahlan to steal the boxes of Orden from the Garden of Life in the People's Palace. Kahlan leaves Spirit behind, the statue Richard carved for her.

Richard, Nicci, and Cara then travel to the People's Palace and learn that the boxes are missing and that they have been put into play. Richard finds the statue Kahlan left and figures out that the Sisters have stolen his wife and the boxes. With the proof in the Garden of Life, Nicci and Cara finally believe in the existence of Kahlan, despite not remembering her. While there, they learn that an older woman has been found fatally stabbed near the D'haran army; Nicci and Richard determine that it is Sister Tovi. Nicci uses deception to interrogate Tovi, discovering that it was Samuel who stabbed Tovi and took the Box of Orden she was carrying. She also learns about the Chainfire spell, about how it was used to obliterate everyone's memory about Kahlan, and that the Boxes of Orden were created in opposition to it. Later, Richard realizes that the Sword of Truth protected him from the Chainfire spell, which is why he was still able to remember Kahlan.

Richard, Nicci and Cara return to the Wizard's Keep and, with the information gathered from Tovi and the book "Chainfire", they finally manage to convince Zedd, Nathan, and Ann of the truth. While no one but Richard remembers Kahlan, they now believe that she exists.

=== Chainfire magic ===
The spell is explained as a complicated memory-altering magic. But it is not as simple as erasing the memory of everyone directly, as this is merely Subtractive Magic. Also, simply attempting to erase the memory because it uses Subtractive Magic, has a strong probability of destroying portions of the mind, thus killing the subject. A death spell, can for instance, make it seem like a person is dead, but everyone still remembers the person existed. Also, if you tried to erase the knowledge of even a simple person like a woodcutter, the nature of reality would be such that all too obvious gaps in memory would be noticed, such as how the woodcutter's wife got her food and wood if she were crippled. For this reason, some wizards came up with a workaround, using some energy to warp reality itself or at least human perception of it. False memories are automatically created to fill the gaps in reality, almost as if someone went back in time and changed them.

=== Wizard's Ninth Rule ===
Each of the novels in the Sword of Truth series reveals a "Wizard's Rule" — a magical principle that allows Wizards to be savvy manipulators of the world around them. The novel reveals the Wizard's Ninth Rule:

A contradiction cannot exist in reality. Not in part, nor in whole.

— Chapter 48, p. 489, U.S. hardcover edition

It is explained in the novel as follows: "To believe in a contradiction is to abdicate your belief in the existence of the world around you and the nature of the things in it, to instead embrace any random impulse that strikes your fancy – to imagine something is real simply because you wish it were. A thing is what it is, it is itself. There can be no contradictions. In reality, contradictions cannot exist. To believe in them you must abandon the most important thing you possess: your rational mind. The wager for such a bargain is your life. In such an exchange, you always lose what you have at stake."

== See also ==
- Dragonlance
- The Wheel of Time
- A Song of Ice and Fire
