= The Little Sisters of Eluria =

Novella by Stephen King

- Cover artwork by Erik Wilson
- Author: Stephen King
- Language: English
- Series: The Dark Tower
- Genre: Fantasy
- Published in: Legends (1st release); Everything's Eventual
- Publication date: 1998
- Publication place: United States
- Media type: Print (Hardcover)
- Followed by: The Gunslinger

The Little Sisters of Eluria is a fantasy novella by American writer Stephen King. It was originally published in 1998 in the anthology Legends. In 2002, it was included in King's collection Everything's Eventual. In 2009, it was published together with the revised edition of The Dark Tower: The Gunslinger by Grant in a limited edition of 4,000 numbered copies of the Artist Edition signed by illustrator Michael Whelan and 1,250 numbered copies of the Deluxe Edition signed by Whelan and Stephen King. Both editions contain Whelan's additional new illustrations for The Gunslinger.

== Plot summary ==
The tale features Roland of Gilead, whose quest for the Dark Tower is in its infancy; its events precede those of the body of the Dark Tower series, but occur after Roland's experiences in Mejis, as chronicled in The Dark Tower IV: Wizard and Glass. At the time of telling he is accompanied by a horse and is already following Walter o'Dim, the Man in Black. He plans to eventually buy another horse, or perhaps a mule, which ties in with the events at the beginning of The Dark Tower: The Gunslinger.

Roland and his horse arrive at a deserted village, Eluria, where they encounter a feral dog bearing a cross-shaped spot in its fur attempting to eat a dead body. Roland scares it off, and while looking over the corpse, finds a rectangular medallion. Roland takes it and is immediately attacked and rendered unconscious by a group of slow mutants. He later awakens in a hospital marquee run by a strange group of nuns. Calling themselves The Little Sisters, they use tiny bug-like creatures they call "doctors" to heal his severe injuries. Roland slowly discovers the Sisters are actually vampires, who bring stray survivors back to their "hospital" only to feed on them once they've recovered.

The medallion Roland took from the dead body in the village proves to be a sort of holy protection from them. He notices another "patient" next to him who bears a matching medallion, and Roland comes to learn that the dead man whose medallion he removed is the brother of his fellow patient. Roland's wounds are eventually healed, but he is powerless to escape from his malevolent benefactors, who keep him weakened with potions. One of the Sisters, Sister Jenna, reveals to Roland that she had involuntarily joined the others and longs to leave them. She sneaks a dose of a powerful herb to Roland, which counteracts the weakening potions, and he slowly regains his strength until they are ready to escape. The Sisters bring one of the mutants to the hospital to remove the medallions from Roland and the patient next to him, since the Sisters are unable to touch the medallions themselves. The mutant realizes the Sisters will most likely kill him after he has removed the medallions, so he removes the medallion from the patient next to Roland and slashes the patient's neck open. The sight of gushing blood incites the Sisters into a feeding frenzy, allowing the mutant to escape and Roland to retain his medallion. The next night, Roland and Sister Jenna initiate their escape, but the other Sisters try to stop them. Sister Jenna reveals an ability to command the "doctors", who provide a diversion. Their leader, Great Sister Mary, soon catches up with them, but is attacked and killed by the same cross-bearing dog Roland first encountered. Roland and Sister Jenna declare love for each other, but Jenna disintegrates into what may have been her natural state, the tiny doctors, while Roland is asleep.

Roland allows himself a moment of sorrow – before his quest for Walter (and ultimately the Tower) continues, once again "quite alone".

== The Dark Tower ==
In The Dark Tower V: Wolves of the Calla (2003), Roland mentions Sister Jenna, noting that after Susan Delgado there was only one woman of note.

In The Dark Tower VI: Song of Susannah (2004) and The Dark Tower VII: The Dark Tower (2004), the "doctor" bugs make another appearance in the Dixie Pig restaurant. The vampires and Low Men receive Mia/Susannah shortly afterward in the Arc 16 Experimental Station, where Sayre threatens Dr. Scowther. It is indicated in The Dark Tower VII: The Dark Tower on pg. 654 that the Mid-World creatures known as "throcken" or "billy-bumblers" are natural predators of these insects, in the statement: "ever had [billy-bumblers'] kind stood enemy to theirs".

In the novel Black House (2001), there is a mention of the "Little Sisters" after Jack Sawyer flips to the territories with Judy's twinner.

== See also ==
- Stephen King short fiction bibliography
