= Naked Empire =

2003 fantasy novel by Terry Goodkind

- Author: Terry Goodkind
- Cover artist: Keith Parkinson
- Language: English
- Series: The Sword of Truth
- Genre: Epic fantasy
- Publisher: Tor Fantasy
- Publication date: July 2003
- Publication place: United States
- Media type: Print (Hardback)
- Pages: 608
- ISBN: 0-7653-0522-4
- OCLC: 52381073
- Dewey Decimal: 813/.54 21
- LC Class: PS3557.O5826 N35 2003
- Preceded by: The Pillars of Creation
- Followed by: Chainfire

Naked Empire is the eighth book in Terry Goodkind's epic fantasy series The Sword of Truth. It was published in 2003 by Tor Books and preceded by the The Pillars of Creation.

== Plot ==
Richard, Kahlan, Cara, Jennsen, Friedrich and Tom are in the Old World, near the Pillars of Creation. They are trying to determine the meaning of a small statue resembling Kahlan. Cara had touched it and it activated like a sand hourglass. Richard notices some ravens and suspects that the birds are tracking them somehow. In the middle of the night, a shadow of a man could be seen with the ravens, his outline betrayed by the swirling sand and grit. Richard also discovers the existence of a boundary, recently destroyed, similar to the ones placed between Westland, the Midlands, and D'Hara, although he could not fathom why it existed. Richard's gift is giving him headaches again, but they're different from before. As they continue to travel, they cross paths with a young man named Owen who recognizes Richard as the Lord Rahl and begs Richard to help save his people from the Order, as his own people are too enlightened to perform violent deeds. With other trouble on his mind, Richard refuses and sends Owen away. Richard begins to notice a problem with the Sword of Truth, as well as his magic. Furthermore, he starts developing a fever and a chill. Nicci sends a letter in warning, but it is destroyed by the Imperial Order before they could finish reading it.

Meanwhile, Zedd and Adie are back at the Wizard's Keep to defend it against Emperor Jagang's Sorceresses. However, they are overwhelmed by intruders who enter the Keep, unaffected by any of the protection spells placed. A sister enters the Keep after Zedd and Adie are tied up and Rada'Hans are placed around their necks.

Richard was poisoned by Owen, a man from the Bandakar Empire, in order to force Richard to save the Bandakar people from the Order. Like Jennsen, Owen is pristinely ungifted, meaning immune and invisible to magic. Arriving in the Bandakar lands, he finds them stunted intellectually and culturally, embracing a philosophy of aggressive passivity, allowing themselves to be dominated entirely by the Order. Given their complete lack of ability to do violence, Owen brought Richard, believing he could drive the Order away. Richard discovers that the Bandakar are the long lost descendants of the House of Rahl's pristinely ungifted children, banished across the boundaries to the Old World three thousand years ago. Once in the Old World, a great wizard then placed them in isolation to prevent their ideas from infecting the rest of the world. Using the Bandakar as hostages, Jagang sent them into the Wizard's Keep to rob it, as the pristinely ungifted Bandakar were totally immune to magic.

Richard demands to meet their leader and is shocked to discover that the Wise One is merely a blindfolded child indoctrinated in their beliefs, as they believed that innocent children could not lead them astray. After proving through debate that this is nonsensical, Richard is nearly killed by a Bandakar still dedicated to their passive beliefs, and the horrified Bandakar realize that despite their ideology, they are also capable of violence. After raising an ad hoc army from the newly converted Bandakar, Richard kills Nicholas the Slide, the creature created by the Sisters of the Dark, by tricking Nicholas into leaving his body vulnerable.

=== Wizard's Eighth Rule ===
Each of the novels in the Sword of Truth series reveals a "Wizard's Rule" — a magical principle that allows Wizards to be savvy manipulators of the world around them. The novel reveals the Wizard's Eighth Rule:

Deserve victory. (Translated from "Talga Vassternich" in High D'Haran, a fictional language of the series)

— Chapter 61, p.626, U.S. hardcover edition

It is explained in the novel as follows: "Be justified in your convictions. Be completely committed. Earn what you want and need rather than waiting for others to give you what you desire."

== See also ==
- Dragonlance
- The Wheel of Time
- A Song of Ice and Fire
