= Severed Souls =

2014 fantasy novel by Terry Goodkind

- Author: Terry Goodkind
- Language: English
- Series: The Sword of Truth
- Genre: Epic fantasy novel
- Publisher: Tor Books
- Publication date: August 5, 2014
- Publication place: United States
- Media type: Print (hardcover)
- Pages: 560
- ISBN: 978-0-7653-2774-1
- Preceded by: The Third Kingdom
- Followed by: Warheart

Severed Souls is the seventeenth book in Terry Goodkind's epic fantasy series The Sword of Truth. It is the third novel in Richard and Kahlan series, which begins right after the end of the original Sword of Truth series. It was published in 2014 by Tor Books and preceded by The Third Kingdom.

== Plot ==
While Bishop Hannis Arc and the ancient Emperor Sulachan lead a vast horde of half people and undead into the heart of D'Hara, Richard and Kahlan must find a way to cure themselves from Jit's stain of death. Richard finds a message for him sent across time by the Magda Searus and Meritt. Eventually, in the unfolding of predestined events, Kahlan is killed and Richard gives up his own soul to try to get Kahlan back into the world of life.

== Sequel ==
On January 11, 2015, Goodkind announced on Facebook that Warheart would be the sequel to Severed Souls and the final book in the series.

== See also ==
- Dragonlance
- The Wheel of Time
- A Song of Ice and Fire
