= Confessor (novel) =

2007 fantasy novel by Terry Goodkind

- First edition cover
- Author: Terry Goodkind
- Cover artist: Keith Parkinson
- Language: English
- Series: The Sword of Truth
- Genre: Epic fantasy novel
- Publisher: Tor Books
- Publication date: November 13, 2007
- Publication place: United States
- Media type: Print (hardback)
- Pages: 673
- ISBN: 0-7653-1523-8
- OCLC: 153578184
- Dewey Decimal: 813/.54 2
- LC Class: PS3557.O5826 C66 2007
- Preceded by: Phantom
- Followed by: The Omen Machine

Confessor is the eleventh book in Terry Goodkind's epic fantasy series The Sword of Truth, and the final in the Chainfire trilogy. It was announced on the author's official website and released on November 13, 2007 by Tor Books, preceded by the Phantom.

== Plot ==
Richard Rahl has been captured by an Imperial Order commander, who spared his life (under the guise of Ruben Rybnik) to be the point man for the commander's Ja'La dh Jin team. Kahlan is also Jagang's prisoner, surrounded by special guards who can see her. During Richard's imprisonment, he is warned by a cloaked specter that he is now a player of the Boxes of Orden. Sister Ulicia is also visited by this figure, and is told that the time to open the Boxes has been reset to one year from the first day of winter-the day that Nicci set the Boxes into motion under Richard's name.

Rachel is discovered missing from the Keep. That night, the witch woman Six enters the Keep and steals the third box of Orden from Nicci and Zedd. Zedd discovers the Keep's warning that the Wizard's Keep is dying due to the contamination of the chimes, and places a spell to protect it from future damage. Zedd, Rikka, and Tom then head to Tamarang to remove the spell blocking Richard's gift.

In an attempt to breach the People's Palace, Jagang orders a massive ramp built to reach the plateau, bypassing the natural defenses of the Palace. While excavating dirt for the ramp in the Azrith Plains, Jagang's diggers stumbled upon the catacombs under the People's Palace, which provide a secret entryway. Three Sisters of the Dark enter, killing Ann and capturing Nicci, while soldiers are sent into the catacombs to prepare an attack. The Sisters of the Dark discover what they believe to be the original Book of Counted Shadows in Bandakar.

Richard, after realizing that Jagang and the Sisters with him would recognize him during team inspections and throughout the tournament, disguises himself by covering the faces and bodies of his teammates and himself with intimidating symbols and parts of spell-forms. His team defeats Jagang's team in the tournament final, but Jagang refuses to accept his team's loss and invalidates the win twice, leading to a riot in the camp, during which Richard and Nicci escape, while Kahlan is 'rescued' by Samuel. Richard and Nicci, with Adie's help, enters the Palace through the catacombs, where Cara and Nathan help them wipe out the Order forces hiding there.

Rachel is lured to Tamarang by Violet, who has drawn a spell around her that sets 'ghostie gobblies' to destroy her. Along the way, she is given a piece of chalk by Shota, disguised as Rachel's mother, and uses this to transfer the spell to Violet. Rachel then restores Richard's gift. Shota reappears as Rachel's mother and sends her to deliver a message with Gratch to the Mud People. On the way to Tamarang, Zedd, Rikka, and Tom are captured by Six, who is in league with Jagang and has helped attack D'Haran forces in the Old World.

Richard is warned by Nicci that he must not reveal his love for Kahlan to her, lest Kahlan's lost memories alone fail to be restored, much like Richard, in the first book of the series, could not be told before finding the way to intimately love a Confessor while being untouched by her power. Richard is taught many spells and spell-forms by Nicci regarding the Boxes of Orden. He tests his knowledge by helping priestess Jillian, who was brought to the Azrith Plains after Jagang's men hunted her down in Caska, give the Order's army terrible nightmares. Jagang is given particularly nasty dreams, mostly involving Nicci. After a demand for surrender by Jagang, Richard then sends himself to the Underworld, using Denna as a spirit guide, and retrieves everyone's memories of Kahlan. He is attacked by the pursuing beast earlier sent against him. He destroys the beast and escapes by releasing Additive Magic into the Underworld, whence he is physically projected into a gathering of the Mud People. He is greeted by Chase and Rachel, who, with Gratch's help, had told the Mud People to hold a gathering to await him. At the Palace, Nathan assumes Richard is dead and, acting on Richard's instructions, accepts Jagang's terms of surrender, which include surrendering Nicci to Jagang and giving the Order's Sisters access to the Garden of Life in order to open the boxes.

Samuel attempts to rape Kahlan; during the struggle, she touches the Sword of Truth, which restores her knowledge, but not her memories, of being a Confessor and releases her power to take control of him. Samuel reveals he is an agent for Six, and that Richard and Kahlan were once married. He then dies when she refuses to forgive his attempt against her. Richard meets Kahlan on the way to Tamarang, but refuses to answer her questions about their marriage, for fear of contaminating the spell upon her. He gives her Spirit in compensation.

Six has imprisoned Zedd, Tom, and Rikka, and appears as Richard and Kahlan arrive in Tamarang. As Six is about to recapture them, Shota appears as Six's mother. She kills Six and then Richard, Kahlan, and Zedd fly back to the People's Palace on the red dragon Six had enslaved; now revealed to be Scarlet's son Gregory, whom Richard saved as an egg.

At the Palace, Richard allows Jagang and his Sisters of the Dark to open the boxes of Orden. During the ritual, Jagang goes to retrieve Nicci from the dungeon. However, Nicci locks a Rada'Han around Jagang's neck, rendering him powerless. After taking him back to the Garden of Life, she eventually kills him unceremoniously to prevent his martyrdom.

In the Garden of Life, the Sisters of the Dark discover the correct box and open it; however, they find a flaw in their success. Richard explains that all of the Books of Counted Shadows were false keys to the boxes; whereas if they had the true key, they would still fail by reason of malicious intent. Immediately, the Sisters are drawn into the Underworld.

Richard explains that the true key to the Magic of Orden is the Sword of Truth. Kahlan tells Richard she loves him, revealing that her emotions have contaminated her chances of regaining memory. Richard uses the Sword to reveal the correct box and then to capture its magic. Now in command of life and death, he uses the magic to send the followers of the Order to a new world, devoid of magic; his half-sister Jennsen, her compatriots the Bandakar, and her suitor Tom decides to relocate to the new world. He also uses Orden to repair the damage caused by the chimes, and to send Chainfire to the new world he has created, ensuring the complete removal of magic from that world, and removing all its inhabitants' memories of their previous world. As Richard goes to close the opening between worlds, he fears Kahlan is lost to him; she, however, replies that she was protected from this loss because she had fallen in love with him on her own, much as he had with her from the beginning.

An epilogue shows Tom and Jennsen expecting a child, who will carry the Rahl name, and shows the immigrants gradually forgetting Richard and everything from their previous world. The book ends with the marriage of Cara and General Meiffert. It is revealed that the Sisters of the Light have moved into the Wizard's Keep, where along with Zedd, they can continue to teach young wizards. Chase (now a Warden of the Keep) and his family have also moved into the Keep, as have Adie and Friedrich, who are now a mated pair. Under Zedd's questions, Richard admits taking Panis Rahl's spell from red fruit, so that it is no longer poison, and to bringing back the Temple of the Winds to the world of the living. After Cara and Benjamin's wedding, the devotion bells begin to ring. Richard prevents the people from kneeling, proclaiming that they are no longer his subjects.

=== Wizard's Eleventh Rule ===
Each of the novels in the Sword of Truth series reveals a "Wizard's Rule" — a magical principle that allows Wizards to be savvy manipulators of the world around them. The eleventh and final rule revealed in Confessor appears to be an unwritten rule. The reason is explained through the character Zeddicus Zu'l Zorander:

The rule of all rules. The rule unwritten. The rule unspoken since the dawn of history... But Barracus wanted you to know that it's the secret to using a war wizard's power. The only way to express it, to make sure that you would grasp what he was intending to tell you, was to give you a book unwritten to signify the rule unwritten.

— Chapter 65, p. 592, U.S. hardcover edition

Richard goes through great struggle to obtain a book left for him by Baraccus, a great wizard from the past. The book entitled Secrets to a War Wizard's power is a means for him to understand how to use his gift and therefore is in essence the solution to major problems. When he obtains the book, its pages are blank and Zedd informs him that Baraccus left it blank to illustrate the meaning of the phrase "rule unwritten". Using this knowledge Richard reasons that the Book of Counted Shadows could not be the key to the boxes of Orden, and that the Sword of Truth was the only way to harness Orden's power. As far as the knowledge within the book was concerned, there was "nothing in it", much like Richard's Secrets to a War Wizard's Power. The Sword of Truth, representative of its namesake, was key to life.

== Cover art ==
Cover artist Keith Parkinson died before Confessor was published, but had created art for all the books in the saga beforehand. Author Terry Goodkind had the following to say: "When Keith and I were working on cover concepts for Chainfire he came up with a number of color roughs that, because of their simple, iconic nature were very close to being final. At the time I recognized three of these roughs as perfect for the Chainfire Trilogy. That means that the final book of the series had already been done by him before he passed away so that is the cover that will appear on the book."

== See also ==
- Dragonlance
- The Wheel of Time
- A Song of Ice and Fire
