= The Sword of Truth =

Series of 21 epic fantasy novels by Terry Goodkind

- Cover of Legend of the Seeker box set volume one
- In chronological order: The Sword of Truth: The First Confessor: The Legend of Magda Searus; Debt of Bones; Wizard's First Rule; Stone of Tears; Blood of the Fold; Temple of the Winds; Soul of the Fire; Faith of the Fallen; The Pillars of Creation; Naked Empire; Chainfire; Phantom; Confessor; The Omen Machine; The Third Kingdom; Severed Souls; Warheart; The Children of D'Hara: The Scribbly Man; Hateful Things; Wasteland; Witch's Oath; Into Darkness; The Nicci Chronicles: Death's Mistress; Shroud of Eternity; Siege of Stone; Heart of Black Ice
- Author: Terry Goodkind
- Cover artist: Keith Parkinson, Doug Beekman (Wizard's First Rule), Kevin Murphy (Blood of the Fold)
- Country: United States
- Language: English
- Genre: Sword and sorcery; Action; Adventure; Romance
- Publisher: Tor Books (US), Gollancz (UK) (Books 1–7), Voyager (UK) (Books 8–11)
- Published: August 15, 1994 – June 30, 2020
- Media type: Print (hardcover and paperback), audiobook
- Preceded by: Debt of Bones

The Sword of Truth is a series of 21 high fantasy novels and six novellas written by Terry Goodkind. The books follow the protagonists Richard Cypher, Kahlan Amnell, Nicci, Cara, and Zeddicus Zu'l Zorander on their quest to defeat oppressors who seek to control the world and those who wish to unleash evil upon the world of the living. While each novel was written to stand alone, except for the final three that were intended to be a trilogy, they follow a common timeline and are linked by ongoing events that occur throughout the series.

The series began in 1994 with Wizard's First Rule and Goodkind wrote eighteen more novels in addition to a novella titled Debt of Bones. The latest novel in the series, Heart of Black Ice, was released in 2020. As of 2008, 25 million copies of the series' books have been sold worldwide, and the series has been translated into more than 20 languages. A television series adaptation of the novels, titled Legend of the Seeker, produced by ABC Studios and broadcast via syndication, first aired on November 1, 2008. The TV series loosely adapts the book series, mixing together elements of several volumes.

Keith Parkinson served as the cover artist for all the novels of the first edition, apart from Wizard's First Rule and Blood of the Fold. New hardback and paperback editions of those two books were later published with new cover illustrations by Parkinson. Parkinson died on October 26, 2005, but not before completing the cover art for two more novels in the series.

== Synopsis ==
The series is set in a world divided into two major regions: the New World and the Old World. The New World consists of three lands with Westland in the west, D'Hara in the east, and the Midlands between them. D'Hara is ruled by a magically gifted member of the Rahl family, while the welfare of the Midlands is decided by a council of representatives led by the Mother Confessor, who is also the leader of the Confessors. The Confessors are a group of women who each have a magical power to force a person to become entirely devoted to them. People touched by a Confessor's power will do anything for her or truthfully answer any question she asks, hence the name Confessor. Westland, a land of no magic, is also ruled by a council of representatives. The Old World is not introduced until the second book in the series and its geographical features are described in less detail.

The main character is a young man named Richard Cypher, a Westland woods guide whose simple life is forever changed after he becomes the Seeker of Truth, a champion of truth and justice. Over the course of the series, Richard learns about his heritage while seeking to stop the evil that others would unleash upon the world of the living. Because Richard refuses to sacrifice his values and lives his life as a free man, others begin to understand the nobility of man and what it means to be free. Each book is loosely themed around a Wizard's Rule, tenets by which all wizards should abide. The eleventh full-length novel, Confessor, concludes the series' central story arc regarding the invasion of the Imperial Order, an empire in the Old World led by Jagang. Warheart was the last novel in the series.

=== Introduction ===
The first book, Wizard's First Rule, takes place in the New World, some twenty or so years after two magical boundaries were raised to separate Westland, the Midlands, and D'Hara. The story deals with the growth of the D'Haran Empire under its leader, Darken Rahl, as he invades the Midlands, taking over its territories while seeking to gain control of an ancient power over life called the Boxes of Orden. The book begins a few weeks after the murder of Richard's father. Richard encounters a young woman by the name of Kahlan Amnell, the Mother Confessor who has come from the Midlands in search of the "Old One," a legendary wizard. He discovers that his best friend and mentor, Zeddicus Zu'l "Zedd" Zorander, is the wizard whom she seeks. Zedd appoints Richard the Seeker of Truth and gives him the Sword of Truth. The sword is said to work through perception; it will cut through anything that its wielder perceives to be a threat but will not cut anything or anyone the wielder regards as innocent. The Sword also amplifies anger, thereby granting its wielder added strength, agility, and conviction.

Richard, Kahlan, and Zedd journey to the Midlands in search of the last Box of Orden that Rahl needs to acquire before he can use the magic of Orden. Along the way, Richard and Kahlan fall in love. The first book concludes with Richard killing Rahl by tricking him into making a mistake, and with the revelation of Richard's true parentage.

=== Invasion of the Imperial Order ===
The series continues with Stone of Tears, which immediately follows the events that occurred in Wizard's First Rule. Unbeknownst to Richard, the opening of the boxes of Orden has torn the veil between the worlds of the living and the dead, allowing minions of the Keeper of the Underworld to come forth. Richard and Kahlan return to the Mud People (whom Richard and Kahlan befriend and defend in Wizard's First Rule) and decide to marry. However, before they can, they are separated when Richard is captured by the Sisters of the Light, sorceresses from the Old World who train men to become wizards. Richard is taken to the Old World while Kahlan goes to Aydindril to ask Zedd for help. On the way, she witnesses the beginning of the Imperial Order's invasion of the New World, led by Emperor Jagang. Upon reaching Aydindril, she discovers that her people have been swayed by the Order's corrupt morality; she is subsequently sentenced to death.

Meanwhile, at the Palace of the Prophets (the Sisters' home in the Old World), Richard learns more about magic, prophecies, and his identity. He escapes the Palace and returns to D'Hara to stop the Keeper from devouring the world of the living. The novel ends with Richard discovering that Kahlan is safe outside Aydindril with her identity shielded by Zedd. Kahlan is reassured that Richard has returned to the New World.

In the third novel, Blood of the Fold, Richard's plan to reunite with Kahlan is delayed by the arrival of beast-like assassins called Mriswith and by the advancement of Jagang's army into the New World. Having accepted his identity as a war wizard - and as the gifted son of Darken Rahl—Richard decides to claim the throne of D'Hara as a means of unifying the fractured Midlands, which, in Kahlan's absence, has weakened to the point of being unable to resist the Order. Kahlan, along with the sorceress Adie, is captured on her way back to Aydindril by the Blood of the Fold, a violent group of zealots who oppose magic on religious grounds. The Blood of the Fold are being tricked by Emperor Jagang, the leader of the Imperial Order, to do his bidding. After realizing that the Blood of the Fold have taken Kahlan and Adie to the Palace of the Prophets, Richard travels to the Old World to rescue them. He takes this opportunity to destroy the Palace, preventing Jagang from using the treasures it holds. While Verna, the new Prelate, leads the Sisters of the Light and their students to join the D'Haran army, Richard and Kahlan return to Aydindril and defeat the Mriswiths, as well as the Blood of the Fold.

The fourth novel, Temple of the Winds, tells of the struggles Richard, Kahlan, and their friends face as they attempt to stop a plague released by Jagang and to prevent him from seizing important items that will help him win the war. As Richard's ancestor Nathan Rahl receives books from Jagang under a tentative deal struck between them, he sends Zedd and Ann, former Prelate of the Sisters of the Light, to destroy the prophecies found within the Jocopo Treasure. As foretold by prophecy regarding the plague, Kahlan betrays Richard in order for him to gain admittance into the Temple of the Winds, wherein he stops the plague. However, the spirit of Darken Rahl appears in the Temple and refuses to let Richard leave unless he willingly contracts the plague. When Richard eventually returns, he and Kahlan forgive each other for their actions. With Nathan and Cara's help, Kahlan is able to cure Richard. The book concludes with Richard and Kahlan's wedding at the Mud People's village, where they are reunited with Zedd and Ann.

Directly following Temple of the Winds, Soul of the Fire revolves around Richard and Kahlan dealing with two threats: the gradual disappearance of all magic and the leaders of the nation of Anderith, who are considering surrendering to the Imperial Order. In so doing, Anderith would hand over control of the Dominie Dirtch, a weapon of mass destruction. Richard and Kahlan discover that a terrible magic known as the "Chimes" has been released and is draining magic from the world, causing magic to fail and creatures of magic to die. They head to Anderith, a place they believe to be connected to the Chimes. As Jagang's army marches towards Anderith, Richard attempts to save its people by urging them to join the D'Haran Empire, but he fails to persuade them. Meanwhile, Ann attempts to save the Sisters of the Light enslaved by Jagang but is betrayed by them and captured. She escapes with the help of her former student, who is a Sister of the Dark. The novel ends with Richard banishing the Chimes and deciding to return to Westland, where he will help Kahlan recover from injuries sustained in Anderith and wait until the people of the New World prove to him that they truly want freedom.

The next volume in the series, Faith of the Fallen, chronicles more than one and a half years of the characters' lives. Nicci, a Sister of the Dark and a follower of the Imperial Order, captures Richard and forces him to travel with her to the Old World by using a magical spell that allows her to control Kahlan's life. Prevented from following Richard, Kahlan and Cara rejoin the D'Haran army in the Midlands. Kahlan assumes control of the army and stalls Jagang's army from capturing Aydindril, the seat of power in the Midlands. When Kahlan finally realizes that she can delay but not stop Jagang's massive army, she travels to the Old World with Cara in search of Richard. Meanwhile, in the Old World capital of Altur'Rang, Richard has begun to inspire its people, including Nicci, to reconsider their moral code and to challenge the Order. The people of Altur'Rang rebel against the Order and declare themselves free of its oppression. Repenting, Nicci removes the spell from Kahlan and joins Richard and Kahlan in their fight against the Order.

=== Journey through the Old World ===
While continuing on from Faith of the Fallen, The Pillars of Creation differs from the other novels in the series in that its protagonists are not Richard and Kahlan, but new characters by the names of Jennsen Rahl and Oba Rahl, who are Richard's half siblings. Both are unaware that they are pristinely ungifted and immune to magic. Jennsen, who has spent most of her life hiding from the Lord Rahl (originally Darken Rahl), meets an Imperial Order spy named Sebastian, who fuels her hatred of the new Lord Rahl (Richard) by convincing her that the Order's beliefs are virtuous. She joins Jagang and his army as they launch an attack on the Confessor's Palace in Aydindril. After their defeat, Jennsen strikes a deal with the Keeper to surrender herself in exchange for Richard's death. Meanwhile, Oba follows the bidding of the Keeper, who is using him in his plan to enter the world of the living. In the novel's climax, Jennsen sees through the Order's lies and chooses to help Richard in his quest against Jagang.

In the eighth novel, Naked Empire, Richard and Kahlan are interrupted during their journey home to the New World when a man named Owen from the empire of Bandakar asks them to help free his people from the Order. Richard and Kahlan reluctantly refuse the request because they are needed elsewhere. In response, Owen poisons Richard and says that he will provide the antidote only if Richard agrees to help. Richard and Kahlan learn that the people of Bandakar are pristinely ungifted like Jennsen and Oba, and that they have been overrun by the Order because they have shunned all forms of violence, refusing to fight for their own lives. Richard eventually convinces them to rise up and drive the Order from their mountain homeland. In the process, Richard learns to restore his gift, which had failed because he misunderstood its true nature and purpose. Meanwhile, the Wizard's Keep in Aydindril is infiltrated by Bandakarian men that the Order has enslaved. The novel ends with Zedd and Chase reclaiming the Keep, and the defeat of the Imperial Order's army in Bandakar.

=== Chainfire ===
Three novels of the series, Chainfire, Phantom, and Confessor, were written as a trilogy called the Chainfire Trilogy, which brings the story arc concerning Jagang's invasion to an end. After recovering from an injury, Richard wakes up to find Kahlan missing and that no one remembers her existence. Richard discovers that the Sisters of the Dark kidnapped Kahlan and cast the Chainfire spell to erase everyone's memories of her, as well as most of Kahlan's memories of herself. However, Richard's mind was protected from the spell by the Sword of Truth. The Sisters use Kahlan to steal the boxes of Orden from the People's Palace in D'Hara, which they intend to use to unleash their master, the Keeper of the Underworld, into the world of the living. Unbeknownst to the Sisters, Jagang still has access to their minds and knows their plans. Meanwhile, Richard, using an alias, is captured by the Imperial Order, who are making their way to the People's Palace in D'Hara. Kahlan, who has also been captured by Jagang, sees Richard, and although she does not remember him, she feels encouraged to fight on and remember her past. After Richard and Kahlan escape from Jagang, they return to the People's Palace, where Richard defeats the Sisters of the Dark and Jagang. To remove the Chainfire spell, Richard must use the magic of Orden. With that power, he not only restores Kahlan's memories and others' memories of her, he also creates an identical world or parallel universe, to which he banishes all people who refuse to cease their assault on individuality and prosperity. Jennsen and the people of Bandakar voluntarily decide to go to this new world devoid of magic because, if they stayed and bred in Richard's world, magic would eventually die out. Richard then closes the gateway and separates the worlds. The series ends with the marriage of Cara and General Meiffert, and Richard's declaration that the traditional D'Haran devotions are no longer necessary, because everyone's life is their own to live.

=== Prequels ===
In addition to the novels, Goodkind wrote a short story titled Debt of Bones for the 1998 anthology Legends, edited by Robert Silverberg. It was published as a stand-alone novella in 2001. The story takes place in The Sword of Truth universe and is set a few decades before the events in the main series, focusing on the creation of the boundaries that separated Westland, the Midlands, and D'Hara in Wizard's First Rule.

Set millennia prior to the main Sword of Truth series, The First Confessor: The Legend of Magda Searus was initially released on July 15, 2012 as an e-book; it was published in print in July 2015. The First Confessor covers a wide variety of information including the Wizards' War, the creation of the Sword of Truth, Confessors, and information about the damage done to magic with the Temple of the Winds. Terry Goodkind's website refers to the book as the "foundation" of the Sword of Truth series.

=== The Richard and Kahlan series ===
On April 2, 2010, a video went up on Terry Goodkind's official site and YouTube channel promoting a new Richard and Kahlan novel that was released on August 16, 2011. The Omen Machine takes place immediately after Confessor, beginning on the night of the wedding of General Benjamin Meiffert and the Mord-Sith Cara. A mysterious machine is found underground and it begins to give predictions, most of which are seemingly benign, but Zedd believes the machine must be destroyed until a prediction is given that scares him to death—one which, if true, will tear apart Richard and Kahlan's life as they know it.

Published on August 20, 2013, The Third Kingdom is the second novel in Goodkind's Richard and Kahlan series. Following an attack by the mysterious "half people" of the Dark Lands, Richard and Kahlan find themselves abandoned by their friends. Richard sets out on a quest to save his friends and meets the sinister Bishop Hannis Arc.

The third novel in the Richard and Kahlan series, Severed Souls, was published on August 5, 2014. Following the events of the previous two books, Richard must find a way to cure Kahlan and himself from the Hedge Maid's stain of death. Meanwhile, Hannis Arc and Emperor Sulachan march toward the heart of D'Hara.

Warheart is the fourth and final entry in the Richard and Kahlan series, published November 17, 2015.

=== The Nicci Chronicles ===
Taking place after the events of the four Richard & Kahlan novels, The Nicci Chronicles follow further exploits of former Sister of the Dark, Nicci, and former prophet, Nathan Rahl.

==== Death's Mistress ====
Released January 24, 2017, Death's Mistress is the first entry in the Nicci Chronicles series and the 18th novel, chronologically, in the Sword of Truth universe. Following the events of Warheart, Nicci decides to take her leave of Richard and Kahlan for a time. Nathan Rahl chooses to accompany her. They go on a mission to the Dark Lands to visit the witch, Red, who tells them of a vague prophecy that she will save the world. Nicci and Nathan's quest takes them across the known world and deep into a forgotten, unmapped region known as the Phantom Coast. Nicci saves a young sailor named Bannon, who joins them on their quest. Nathan begins to lose control of his magic, seemingly because prophecy itself has been eradicated. The trio crosses the Phantom Coast, fights off Viking-like Norukai and vicious sea monsters, stops a mad judge who froze an entire population with a cursed necklace, meets the last dragon left in the Old World, and discovers an ancient archive of arcane magic.

==== Shroud of Eternity ====
Shroud of Eternity, released January 9, 2018, is the second entry in the Nicci Chronicles series and is the 19th novel, chronologically, in the Sword of Truth universe. Picking up where Death's Mistress left off, Nicci, Nathan, and Bannon find Kol Adair, a mountain pass which leads to a field full of petrified soldiers. Nathan recognizes some of the soldiers' insignias, claiming them to be the army of a General Utros, a powerful military commander who served another would-be despot, Emperor Kurgan, 1,500 years prior. The following night, Nicci, Nathan, and Bannon encounter three strange young men who are destroying the statues. The three men lead them into the city of Ildakar which, an ancient city frozen in time. Recently, the shroud of protective magic around the city has begun to fail. Nicci, Nathan, and Bannon introduce themselves to the Ildakarians as official emissaries of Lord Rahl and begin trying to forge an alliance. They soon learn that Ildakar is a society ruled over by the gifted, who enjoy lavish lifestyles and enslave the ungifted. Prelate Verna Sauventreen and General Zimmer, having returned to Tanimura to lead an excavation of the Palace of the Prophets, decide to assist Nicci and Nathan.

==== Siege of Stone ====
Released December 31, 2018, Siege of Stone is the third entry in the Nicci Chronicles and is the 20th novel, chronologically, in the Sword of Truth universe. After a joining a slave uprising and overthrowing the leader of Ildakar, Nicci, Nathan, and Bannon begin working to rebuild the city. Commander Maxim, husband of the city's defeated leader, goes missing, and shortly thereafter, General Utros's army of stone soldiers awakens and renews its war on Ildakar in the name of an Emperor long dead. The Norukai King, Grieve, also begins planning assaults on Ildakar and the D'Haran Empire, hoping to conquer the world.

==== Heart of Black Ice ====
Heart of Black Ice, released January 21, 2020, is the fourth and final entry in the Nicci Chronicles and the 21st Novel, chronologically, in the Sword of Truth universe. After Nicci travels north to warn the cities of the Old World of the impending attacks, the leadership of Ildakar betray her and her allies, recreating the Shroud of Eternity and leaving them stranded. As the third Sliph, an emphatic supporter of old Emperor Sulachan, realizes that Nicci is her enemy, she decides to strand her alone in the ruins of the city of Orogang, somewhere in the mountains of the Phantom Coast. Bannon is captured and enslaved by the Norukai and the protagonists' army is vastly outnumbered by Utros's stone soldiers. Utros makes a deal with Grieve to unite their forces and declare war on D'Hara.

=== The Children of D'Hara ===
In 2019, Terry Goodkind began to release novellas following Richard & Kahlan after the events of Warheart. Richard promises Kahlan that they would help bring about a new Golden Age for their empire. The People's Palace is suddenly attacked by an amphibian race of beings from another dimension who call themselves the Glee. They wish to hunt man for sport and follow the commands of their queen, known only as the Golden Goddess. They can possess humans and disappear at will but are confused and terrified by magic. The Glee believe that they will no longer have to fear magic if they eliminate Richard's bloodline because he is the most powerful wizard alive. Kahlan learns that she is pregnant with Richard Rahl's children—a pair of fraternal twins.

=== Further works ===
- The Law of Nines. Released August 18, 2009, this novel is set on Earth, 1,000 years after the events of the Sword of Truth novels. It was written immediately following Confessor. A descendant of Jennsen Rahl and Tom is harassed by warriors from the Sword of Truth universe, and a sorceress named Jax comes to his aid as he tries to understand what these new enemies want.

== Publications ==
Published order	Chronological order	Title	Publication date	Series
1	3	Wizard's First Rule	August 15, 1994	Sword of Truth
2	4	Stone of Tears	September 15, 1995	Sword of Truth
3	5	Blood of the Fold	October 15, 1996	Sword of Truth
4	6	Temple of the Winds	September 15, 1997	Sword of Truth
5	2	Debt of Bones	August 25, 1998	Prequel
6	7	Soul of the Fire	March 15, 1999	Sword of Truth
7	8	Faith of the Fallen	August 22, 2000	Sword of Truth
8	9	The Pillars of Creation	November 20, 2001	Sword of Truth
9	10	Naked Empire	July 21, 2003	Sword of Truth
10	11	Chainfire	January 4, 2005	Sword of Truth
11	12	Phantom	July 18, 2006	Sword of Truth
12	13	Confessor	November 13, 2007	Sword of Truth
13	23	The Law of Nines	August 18, 2009	Far Future Sequel
14	14	The Omen Machine	August 16, 2011	Richard and Kahlan
15	1	The First Confessor: The Legend of Magda Searus	July 2, 2012	Prequel
16	15	The Third Kingdom	August 20, 2013	Richard and Kahlan
17	16	Severed Souls	August 12, 2014	Richard and Kahlan
18	17	Warheart	November 17, 2015	Richard and Kahlan
19	18b	Death's Mistress	January 24, 2017	The Nicci Chronicles*
20	19b	Shroud of Eternity	January 9, 2018	The Nicci Chronicles*
21	20b	Siege of Stone	January 1, 2019	The Nicci Chronicles*
22	18a	The Scribbly Man	April 4, 2019	Children of D'Hara*
23	19a	Hateful Things	June 6, 2019	Children of D'Hara*
24	20a	Wasteland	August 1, 2019	Children of D'Hara*
25	21a	Witch's Oath	January 6, 2020	Children of D'Hara*
26	21b	Heart of Black Ice	January 21, 2020	The Nicci Chronicles*
27	22a	Into Darkness	June 30, 2020	Children of D'Hara*

* The Nicci Chronicles and Children of D'Hara both start after Warheart and run in parallel.

== World writing ==
=== Wizard's Rules ===
A thread woven through the original series are the 11 "Wizard's Rules", which are practical teachings given to young wizards. The first rule appears in Wizard's First Rule. Further rules are mentioned on occasion, afterwards.

1. Wizard's First Rule: "People are stupid; given proper motivation, almost anyone will believe almost anything. Because people are stupid, they will believe a lie because they want to believe it's true, or because they're afraid it might be true. Peoples' heads are full of knowledge, facts and beliefs, and most of it is false, yet they think it all true. People are stupid; they can only rarely tell the difference between a lie and the truth, and yet they are confident they can, and so are all the easier to fool."
2. Wizard's Second Rule: "The Second Rule is that the greatest harm can result from the best intentions."
3. Wizard's Third Rule: "Passion rules reason."
4. Wizard's Fourth Rule: "The Wizard's Fourth Rule, he called it. He said that there was magic in sincere forgiveness, in the Fourth Rule. Magic to heal. In forgiveness you grant, and more so in the forgiveness you receive."
5. Wizard's Fifth Rule: "Mind what people do, not only what they say, for deeds will betray a lie."
6. Wizard's Sixth Rule: "The most important rule there is, the Wizard's Sixth Rule: the only sovereign you can allow to rule you is reason. The first law of reason is this: what exists, exists, what is, is and from this irreducible bedrock principle, all knowledge is built. It is the foundation from which life is embraced. Thinking is a choice. Wishes and whims are not facts nor are they a means to discover them. Reason is our only way of grasping reality; it is our basic tool of survival. We are free to evade the effort of thinking, to reject reason, but we are not free to avoid the penalty of the abyss that we refuse to see. Faith and feelings are the darkness to reason's light. In rejecting reason, refusing to think, one embraces death."
7. Wizard's Seventh Rule: "Life is the future, not the past. The past can teach us, through experience, how to accomplish things in the future, comfort us with cherished memories, and provide the foundation of what has already been accomplished. But only the future holds life. To live in the past is to embrace what is dead. To live life to its fullest, each day must be created anew. As rational, thinking beings, we must use our intellect, not a blind devotion to what has come before, to make rational choices."
8. Wizard's Eighth Rule: "Talga Vassternich. Deserve Victory."
9. Wizard's Ninth Rule: "A contradiction can not exist in reality. Not in part, nor in whole. To believe in a contradiction is to abdicate your belief in the existence of the world around you and the nature of the things in it, to instead embrace any random impulse that strikes your fancy - to imagine something is real simply because you wish it were. A thing is what it is, it is itself. There can be no contradictions. Faith is a device of self-delusion, a sleight of hand done with words and emotions founded on any irrational notion that can be dreamed up. Faith is the attempt to coerce truth to surrender to whim. In simple terms, it is trying to breathe life into a lie by trying to outshine reality with the beauty of wishes. Faith is the refuge of fools, the ignorant, and the deluded, not of thinking, rational men. In reality, contradictions cannot exist. To believe in them you must abandon the most important thing you possess: your rational mind. The wager for such a bargain is your life. In such an exchange, you always lose what you have at stake."
10. Wizard's Tenth Rule: "Willfully turning aside from the truth is treason to one's self."
11. Wizard's Eleventh Rule: "The rule of all rules. The rule unwritten. The rule unspoken since the dawn of history... But Barracus wanted you to know that it's the secret to using a war wizard's power. The only way to express it, to make sure that you would grasp what he was intending to tell you, was to give you a book unwritten to signify the rule unwritten."
12. Un-numbered Wizard Rule One: "There will always be those who hate and always will be." Meaning, one shouldn't waste time trying to defeat or fix people who are driven by hate, as the act can often cause hatred to worsen, or spread to others.
13. Un-numbered Wizard's Rule Two: "All things must die. There is no choice in that, only in how we choose to live."
14. Un-numbered Wizard's Rule Three: "You can destroy those who speak the truth, but you cannot destroy the truth itself."
15. Un-numbered Wizard's Rule Four: "Life gives dimension to time."

=== Creatures ===
Throughout the series, various magical creatures & beings were brought up, or made appearances. Some of them were from actual mythology, others were fictionalized by the author & others were based on existing mythology, but with unique twists in the original idea.

- Beast, The—A formless entity created to hunt and kill Richard. It comes and goes as it pleases from the Underworld and assumes a different form each time.

First appearance—Chainfire; Last appearance—Confessor

- Bird Man—Among the nation of the Mud People, a high ranking holy man exists, known in the series only as the Bird Man. He is able to call any bird he wishes to himself, can read signs from beyond & often participates in, or leads, many magical ceremonies.

First appearance—Wizard's First Rule; Last appearance—Confessor

- The Chimes—groups of shape shifting, elemental, fairy like creatures who kill people and taint magic by existing in worlds with magic. They were long banished to the Underworld, but came back briefly in one book. They are known as the Reechani, Sentrosi and Vasi.

Appearance—Soul of the Fire

- Confessor—Confessors are a magically formed race of women given the power of Confession. They can force anyone to fall so madly in love with them that they will do anything the Confessor asks. Prior to the beginning of the series, they had taken to ruling over the Midlands, a loose connection of separate lands confederated under them. They primarily used their powers to force confessions of criminals and to dethrone would-be tyrants. All Confessors wear matching black dresses, except for their leader, who wears white. The leader of the Confessors is the Mother Confessor. Their only weakness is that they can only use their powers once, and then need time to rest and recharge. This time varies from Confessor to Confessor.

First appearance—The First Confessor; Last appearance—The Children of D'Hara 5: Into Darkness

- Dragon—Just like dragons from medieval lore. There are various dragon species, but only a few types are ever met. Some dragons even have the ability to speak and reason, but there are allusions to other species which are kept as pets for hunting purposes. Given how dangerous they are, humans have long hunted them for their own protection, making them increasingly rarer. In the Sword of Truth universe, their existence is linked to magic so that, if magic dies out, so do they. Nicci once attempts to kill an elderly dragon with Wizard's Fire, but it has the opposite effect, actually seeming to heal and de-age the creature.

First appearance—Wizard's First Rule; Last appearance—The Nicci Chronicles

- Dreamwalker—a person with the magic to see into people's minds, and even control them, both through pain and humiliation, as well as literally, like a puppet. They were created as a weapon and are marked with solid black eyes. The only Dreamwalker in the series was Emperor Jagang.

First appearance—Blood of the Fold; Last appearance—Confessor

- Adjudicator—a wizard who used an amulet to turn the "guilty" to stone. Was driven mad with power and decided all people were guilty of something or other and must be made to suffer for it.

Appearance—The Nicci Chronicles: Death's Mistress

- Gar—A nightmarish creature best described as a cross between a gorilla, a bat and a gremlin that hunts through the use of Blood Flies. It wipes Gore from prior meal on its stomach to feed the biting flies, which then stay close and spread out to attack and flush out further prey for the Gar. Two species are made note of- long tailed and short tailed, with the latter being the smartest.

First appearance—Wizard's First Rule; Last appearance—Confessor

- Glee—A reptilian race of beings from an entirely different world, who use a device to enter Richard's world to hunt humans.

First appearance—The Children of D'Hara 1: The Scribbly Man; Last appearance—The Children of D'Hara 5: Into Darkness

- Half People—soulless monstrosities who kill and canabalize the living in order to try to gain a soul through eating the dying alive. Some of them have Occult Powers. They were created by Emperor Sulachan.

First appearance—The Third Kingdom; Last appearance—Warheart

- Hearthounds—Underworld creatures who take the form of wolf-like beings when in this world. Came out at night from within the boundary. It was theorized that the name came from their hunting by listening for one's heartbeat.

First appearance—Wizard's First Rule; Last appearance—The Pillars of Creation

- Hedge Maid—a sort of witch with access to Occult Powers. Her mouth is sewn shut, as her scream is lethal. She can call spirits and control the dead.

Appearance—The Omen Machine

- Lifedrinker—A wizard who used a spell to save his life from cancer, which caused him to nearly bleed the entire world dry.

Appearance—The Nicci Chronicles: Death's Mistress

- Life's Mistress—a former sorceress who misused a spell to try to repair the damage done to a fertile valley, which turned her into a giant plant monster, gave her control over plants and the ability to change humans into nymph-like soldiers who followed her will.

Appearance—The Nicci Chronicles: Death's Mistress

- Morazeth—a variation on the Mord-Sith that only existed in the city of Ildakar. They use an Agile Knife, rather than an Agiel, and were primarily used to train arena fighters for the amusement of the Ildakaran upper class, as well as serving as bodyguards. They are minimally dressed in black leather, buzz cut their heads and are covered in welted magical runes that protect them from magical attack.

First appearance—The Nicci Chronicles: Shroud of Eternity; Last appearance—The Nicci Chronicles; Heart of Black Ice

- Mord-Sith—Used in the series primarily by the House of Rahl, Debt of Bones noted that the use of them was once more widespread and later books confirmed that others can utilize them. They wear skin tight, red leather catsuits and their hair in a long, single braid. Kidnapped and torturned into insanity as children, they serve as torturers and bodyguards. The magic of their weapons ensure that they must have a master in order to have power. A Confessors touch is an excruciatingly violent and painful death to a Mord-Sith.

First appearance—Wizard's First Rule; Last appearance—The Children of D'Hara 5: Into Darkness

- Mriswith—reptilian monsters created from people long ago. They can become invisible and are expert fighters.

First appearance—Stone of Tears; Last appearance—Blood of the Fold

- Night Wisp—a fairy like entity that only appears as a ball of light and speaks with a child like voice. Their survival depends on companionship and they will grow weak and die without their own kind near. They usually live in colonies, but only one such place is ever visited within the series.

First appearance—Wizard's First Rule; Last appearance—Confessor

- Priestess of the Bones—A job passed down through a tribe of Nomadic people in southern D'Hara. It was prophesied that a certain someone would one day need her help. Can use her pet Raven to carry dreams to others nearby that she wishes them to see.

First appearance—Chainfire; Last appearance—Confessor

- Pristinely Ungifted—Someone born without even a single spark of the gift for magic within them, causing magic to be entirely nonexistent where they are concerned. They can only be harmed by it indirectly and can't be sensed by those with magic. They came about as an accidental consequence of the Rahl family attempting to bypass the progressive loss of magic in their world to ensure that they will always have a gifted heir in every generation. Every child of a Pristinely Ungifted individual inherits the trait, making people fear that their existence will destroy magic forever if they are not all killed.

First appearance—Pillars of Creation; Last appearance—Confessor

- Prophet—a type of wizard who can also deliver prophecies. However, this type of wizard goes extinct following the events of Warheart.

First appearance—Stone of Tears; Last appearance—Warheart

- Screeling—Underworld creature which takes the form of a dried up, desiccated, human corpse in this world. They have needle-like teeth, golden eyes, claw-like nails and walk on all fours. They adapt to the world of the living slowly, but are extremely powerful and violent.

Appearance—Stone of Tears

- Sea Serpent—Exactly as the name implies. The Norukai people worship them as gods.

Appearance—The Nicci Chronicles: Heart of Black Ice

- Seeker of Truth—a type of avenging warrior created by wizards long ago to force truth out into the open and lead people towards more wise lives. They are given a weapon known as the sword of truth to accomplish the task, but must still be the right kind of person in the first place.

First appearance—Wizard's First Rule; Last appearance—The Children of D'Hara 5: Into Darkness

- Seer—someone who has prophetic visions at will, but not always clear or obvious ones. They have no other abilities beyond this, seemingly. The only Seer in the series was Jebra Bevinvier.

First appearance—Stone of Tears; Last appearance—Confessor

- Selka—Aquatic creatures created from people long ago to engage in Marine warfare. They live in the ocean south of the Old World.

First appearance—The Nicci Chronicles: Death's Mistress; Last appearance—The Nicci Chronicles: Heart of Black Ice

- Sisters of the Dark—a group of sorceresses who turned to the worship of the Keeper of the Underworld for a variety of personal reasons. They murdered and stole the gift from Wizards to get power equal to a wizard, and gained Subtractive Magic from the Underworld in return for their service. They were all originally Sisters of the Light and hid in plain sight. The Sisters had a hard time rooting them out, as it was their law that wrongful accusation of being a Sister of the Dark was seen as attempted murder and carried with it a death sentence.

First appearance—Stone of Tears; Last appearance—Confessor

- Sisters of the Light—a group of sorceresses who tried to fill in the gap of training young wizards who had no wizard teacher themselves in the use of their powers. They were a semi-religious order who worshipped the Creator and lived in the Palace of the Prophets together, until it was destroyed. They later took up residence in the Wizard's Keep.

First appearance—Stone of Tears; Last appearance—The Nicci Chronicles: Heart of Black Ice

- Skrin—Underworld creature that takes the form of a giant, hairless dog with horns when in this world. It is said that they are the physical embodiment of the force which keeps the dead in the Underworld and the living in this one.

First appearance—Stone of Tears; Last appearance—Temple of the Winds

- Slide—a wizard-weapon which can steal souls to use for special spells and can possess any living thing with eyes to see through them.

Appearance—Naked Empire

- Sliph—a creature created to transport people great distances through a series of underground tunnels. They are made of a substance similar to Mercury/ Quicksilver and work through the individual asking for a destination, breathing in the creature and allowing it to pull them under and take them there. They can only go to pre-determined places, where Sliph Wells have been constructed. They were once people. Although it was believed that "The" Sliph in the Wizard's Keep was the only one, two others have since appeared in the series who go by different names.

First appearance—Blood of the Fold; Last appearance—The Nicci Chronicles: Heart of Black Ice

- Sorcerer—a sort of antithesis to a wizard. They are noted to have similar powers, but their powers are equal and opposite and don't work correctly against one another.

Appearance—Faith of the Fallen

- Sorceress—the female equivalent of a wizard, but usually arguably weaker. They cannot do some of the things wizards are known for, such as creating Wizard's Fire.

First appearance—Wizard's First Rule; Last appearance—The Nicci Chronicles: Heart of Black Ice

- Warlock—noted as the male equivalent of a Witch Woman. They can do everything a witch can. The only Warlock in the series was Moravaska Michec.

First appearance—The Children of D'Hara 3: Wasteland; Last appearance—The Children of D'Hara 4: Witch's Oath

- War Wizard—a unique and rare type of wizard who is extremely powerful and has varied potential skills
- Witch Woman—can see into the future and create illusions. Are usually feared and persecuted. Shota is the best known in the series, but there have been several so far.

First appearance—Wizard's First Rule; Last appearance—The Children of D'Hara 5: Into Darkness

- Wizard—a generic term for several types of male gifted individuals with unique powers.

First appearance—Wizard's First Rule; Last appearance—The Children of D'Hara 5: Into Darkness

- Zhiss—A creature resembling a swarm of angry insects. They attack anything that moves as one and drink blood until their victim dies. They arrived on a comet and took over the ruins of the city of Orogang.

Appearance—The Nicci Chronicles: Heart of Black Ice

=== Magic ===
Various magical relics, artifacts and powers come up throughout the series as well. These are explained below.

- Additive Magic—Magic of the world of the living. Can only add to or create.
- Agiel—Choice weapon of the Mord-Sith. A leather rod in a gold chain. It is powered by the bond to their master and can inflict any sort of damage the user wishes. It often causes like pain to the user in return, as they usually use the same Agiel that they were tortured with themselves.
- Agile Knife—a small wooden handle with a pop-out needle on one end. The choice weapon of Morazeth. Inflicts pain when a rune is touched.
- Books of Prophecy—various books in which the words which go along with the visions of Prophets are recorded. They help to trigger the same visions in other Prophets who read them. Some are spelled so that others can't understand them, or remember anything that they say within.
- Bond, The—Created by the Alric Rahl. Anyone who swears allegiance to the Lord Rahl becomes protected. In return, pure blooded D'Harans always know exactly where their Lord Rahl is at all times.
- Boundary—Created to break Westland, the Midlands and D'Hara up to force the end of a war between the Midlands and D'Hara. It is a wall made of the Underworld itself breaching up into the world of the living and glows green. Anyone who walks through it died instantly.
- Boxes of Orden—three boxes keeping safe the power to control just about everything. An instruction booklet called the Book of Counted Shadows was created to aid in the process of acquiring that power.
- Central Sites—hidden tombs and crypts filled with esoteric books of Prophecy. Created to keep books safe for the time when they would be needed the most.
- Chainfire Event—a spell meant to make people forget that a person exists. It erases all memory of the individual, rebuilds new memories when missing memory is discovered and makes it impossible for new memories of someone to form, rendering a person as good as invisible.
- Con'dar (Blood Rage)-- a special Subtractive power capable of being tapped by some Confessors. Puts them into a trance, allows them to call down lightning and makes their Confession powers unlimited.
- Containment Field—a room spelled to be hermetically sealed in terms of magic. Allows people to do spells in isolation, or try to work on or dismantle spells that could be dangerous.
- Confession—A power given to Confessors. It wipes clean everything a person ever was or cared about and fills them instead with a desperate, burning desire to please their Confessor by any means necessary.
- Constructed Spells—spells attached to an item. They can be activated at any time through a built-in trigger.
- Gateway—a device which allows people to travel between worlds.
- Grace, The—religious and magic symbol which represents the Creator and the gift
- Han—the technical term for a person's magic. Sometimes also referred to as the spark of magic, or the gift.
- Journey Book(s)-- built in pairs, they allow two people to communicate in writing, no matter how far away they are.
- Language of Creation—a magical, symbol language keyed to physical forms magic takes on when visible.
- Law of Nines, The—a magical law which means that things that come in sets of three are inherently more powerful, but three sets of three sets is even more powerful.
- Occult Power—the reverse power to the gift. Can achieve things the gift normally cannot, like manipulating the wear of time upon a person or object and manipulating life and death itself.
- Omen Machine—the physical manifestation of Prophecy in the real world. It was hidden beneath the People's Palace for untold generations and is somewhat sentient.
- Quillion—a crystal used to absorb and transfer magic from one person and give it to another. Only works if the person is skinned alive first.
- Rada'han—a metal collar which takes control of a person through their magic. Used by the Sisters of the Light to keep trainee Wizards under control.
- Shroud of Eternity—magical veil which removed the city of Ildakar from time and space.
- Subtractive Magic—the opposite of additive magic. Mainly comes from the Underworld. People were once born with it, but fewer and fewer came about over time. Can only destroy or make things vanish.
- Sword of Truth—The key to the power of the orden created by the Orden Sect is its two different spells, the white one is the mainstay of the cult's power, carried by real seekers and used in anger and compassion.
- Temple of the Winds—magical archive which is somewhat sentient. Was sent to the Underworld 3000 years ago to protect its dangerous contents from misuse.
- Towers/Valley of Perdition—several towers built in line to create a shifting boundary of illusions to cut off the New World from the Old World 3009 years ago.
- Verification Web—a spell used to understand what another spell is by viewing what it would do and how in a safe environment. Usually done within a Containment Field.

== Reception ==
The novel series frequently enters lists of top fantasy novels. In 2011, an NPR poll of 60,000 readers from among 5,000 fantasy novels nominated, found the series as the 62nd most popular fantasy/science fiction novel of all time.

The influence of Goodkind's political philosophy in his writing has been noted by reviewers and commentators. This has led to divisive reactions about his novels, with some criticizing their Objectivist themes and others praising them. Goodkind himself was open about this influence and was described as an invigorating contrarian who enjoyed stirring up controversy. He has been criticized for writing female characters who adhere to sexist stereotypes and for frequently subjecting them to sexual violence, though he stated his stories were centered on "strong female characters" and once objected to a book cover he considered sexist.

== TV series adaptation ==
In July 2006, Goodkind announced on his official website that he had entered into negotiations with The Evil Dead and Spider-Man director Sam Raimi and producer Rob Tapert to bring The Sword of Truth to life as a TV live-action weekly series. According to the article, Raimi, Tapert and Joshua Donen planned to begin work on the Wizard's First Rule live-action weekly series in May 2008. Raimi & Tapert also wanted Goodkind to remain intimately involved with the project. The show was renamed Legend of the Seeker because the producers wanted to be able to continue the series beyond the first book, and they felt the title Wizard's First Rule was too restrictive. It premiered on November 1, 2008.

There are significant differences between the events of the novels and those of the series. In a February 2008 letter addressed to the fans, Terry Goodkind wrote, "The nature of TV syndication requires that each week's episode be a story in itself, meaning that while the TV series will follow the background story of the book, it will not be able to follow the book exactly because there would be parts that would make an incomplete episode." He later confirmed:

Sam Raimi and his team want to keep the TV series true to my vision, so rest assured that I am going to be intimately involved in the writing of each of the episodes. If you love the book just the way it is, then enjoy the book for what it is and come to the TV series prepared to enjoy the show for what it is.

The TV series ran for two seasons, concluding May 22, 2010 with a total of 44 episodes.

== See also ==
- Dragonlance
- The Wheel of Time
- A Song of Ice and Fire
