= Legends (anthology) =

1998 anthology of fantasy novellas

Legends: Short Novels by the Masters of Modern Fantasy
- First edition cover
- Editor: Robert Silverberg
- Author: Various
- Language: English
- Genre: Fantasy
- Published: August 25, 1998
- Publisher: Voyager Books
- Publication place: United States
- Media type: Print (hardcover & paperback)
- Pages: 708
- ISBN: 0-312-86787-5
- OCLC: 183214571
- Dewey Decimal: 813/.0876608 21
- LC Class: PS648.F3 L44 1998
- Followed by: Legends II

Legends: Short Novels by the Masters of Modern Fantasy is a 1998 anthology of 11 novellas by a number of English-language fantasy authors, edited by Robert Silverberg. All the stories were original to the collection, and set in the authors' established fictional worlds. The anthology won a Locus Award for Best Anthology in 1999. Its science fiction equivalent, Far Horizons, followed in 1999.

The collection has a sequel, Legends II, published in 2003.

== Contents ==
- Stephen King: "The Little Sisters of Eluria" (The Dark Tower)
- Terry Goodkind: "Debt of Bones" (The Sword of Truth)
- Orson Scott Card: "Grinning Man" (The Tales of Alvin Maker)
- Robert Silverberg: "The Seventh Shrine" (Majipoor)
- Ursula K. Le Guin: "Dragonfly" (Earthsea)
- Raymond E. Feist: "The Wood Boy" (The Riftwar Cycle)
- Terry Pratchett: "The Sea and Little Fishes" (Discworld)
- George R. R. Martin: The Hedge Knight (novella, A Song of Ice and Fire)
- Tad Williams: "The Burning Man" (Memory, Sorrow, and Thorn)
- Anne McCaffrey: "Runner of Pern" (Dragonriders of Pern)
- Robert Jordan: "New Spring" (The Wheel of Time)

== Editions ==
- A hardback edition was published by Voyager on October 5, 1998 in the United Kingdom with ISBN 0-00-225666-5.
- A paperback edition was published by Voyager on June 7, 1999 in the United Kingdom with ISBN 0-00-225667-3.

A re-release was published by Voyager in which Legends was split into two halves, both titled Legends.

- Volume One ISBN 0-00-648394-1 - published on November 1, 1999, containing:
  - "The Sea and Little Fishes"
  - "Runner of Pern"
  - "The Hedge Knight"
  - "The Burning Man"
  - "New Spring"
- Volume Two ISBN 0-00-648393-3 - published on April 3, 2000 (a special overseas edition was issued in 1999), both containing:
  - "The Little Sisters of Eluria"
  - "Debt of Bones"
  - "Grinning Man"
  - "The Seventh Shrine"
  - "Dragonfly"
  - "The Wood Boy"

== Serialization ==
In 1999 Tor Books decided to re-release the stories from the anthology, now split across three volumes.

- Legends Vol. 1 (1999) ISBN 0-8125-6663-7 - "The Little Sisters of Eluria", "The Seventh Shrine", "Grinning Man", and "The Wood Boy"
- Legends Vol. 2 (1999) ISBN 0-8125-7523-7 - "Debt of Bones", "The Hedge Knight", and "Runner of Pern"
- Legends Vol. 3 (2000) ISBN 0-8125-6664-5 - "New Spring", "Dragonfly", "The Burning Man", and "The Sea and Little Fishes"

== Reception ==
Legends won a Locus Award for Best Anthology in 1999.

== See also ==
- Far Horizons
- Legends II
