= Temple of the Winds =

1997 fantasy novel by Terry Goodkind

- Author: Terry Goodkind
- Cover artist: Keith Parkinson
- Language: English
- Series: The Sword of Truth
- Genre: Epic fantasy
- Publisher: Tor Fantasy
- Publication date: September 15, 1997
- Publication place: United States
- Media type: Print (Hardback)
- Pages: 528
- ISBN: 0-312-89053-2
- OCLC: 36807298
- Dewey Decimal: 813/.54 21
- LC Class: PS3557.O5826 T45 1997
- Preceded by: Blood of the Fold
- Followed by: Soul of the Fire

Temple of the Winds is the fourth book in Terry Goodkind's epic fantasy series The Sword of Truth. It was published in 1997 by Tor Books and preceded by the Blood of the Fold.

== Plot ==
Temple of the Winds picks up shortly where the last volume, Blood of the Fold, left off. A wizard named Marlin appears in Aydindril announcing his intent to kill Richard Rahl. He is immediately captured and questioned by the Mother Confessor, Kahlan Amnell, and one of Richard's bodyguards, Cara. Cara uses her Mord'Sith ability to capture Marlin's gift when he tries to escape, but the link between Cara and Marlin is used against her when Emperor Jagang takes possession of Marlin soon thereafter. A lady named Nadine, whom Richard had known as an herbalist from the Westland, arrives and attempts to heal Cara, but fails. Richard's half-brother Drefan, a self-proclaimed high priest of a sect of healers, does, however, succeed in curing Cara with acupressure. Kahlan learns that Nadine and Richard had been close, but that Nadine had pursued Richard's brother in a baffling attempt to seduce Richard.

Meanwhile, Zedd and Prelate Annalina continue their search for the unleashed Nathan Rahl. Their search leads them to a run down inn in an unnamed city, where they discover that Nathan misled them into following another man. The man then gives them a message informing them not to follow Nathan but to protect a treasure instead. A Sister of the Dark, who was also following Nathan, ends up getting caught in a snare Zedd intended for the Prophet Rahl. Meanwhile, Nathan rescues a woman named Clarissa from a life of slavery in the Imperial Order. He then builds a relationship with the woman and uses her to obtain items from Jagang that were given under a tentative deal struck between Nathan (acting as Lord Rahl at the time) and the Emperor.

Richard and Berdine continue to work on the translation of the 'Journal of Kolo'. In the midst of all these activities, a Sister of the Dark travels through Aydindril spreading a magical plague. In a search for a cure, Richard travels to the First Wizard's Enclave. To save the people of the Midlands from the plague, Kahlan is told again and again by prophecy and the ancestor spirits of the Mud People that she must betray Richard to allow him to enter the Temple of the Winds, and that Richard must marry Nadine, or everyone in the New World will die of the plague. Even confronting the witch Shota, who sent Nadine to the Palace, Shota says that it was out of pity for Richard, that Nadine was the only other woman he ever even remotely cared for, and that the prophecy is unstoppable.

Eventually, a form of messenger from the Temple arrives and Cara steals his gift and the message, stating that Richard must marry Nadine and Kahlan must marry Drefan, and that the marriage must be immediately consummated, and in total silence. Utterly crushed at the loss of Richard, and wanting any form of comfort, Kahlan gives in, believing she is with Drefan. However, as lightning starts to crash all around, she sees it's Richard. Cara had swapped them in the dark of the corridors leading to the Temple. In the distance, Drefan throws Nadine from the cliffs as he had planned to do with Kahlan all along. Richard, feeling betrayed by Kahlan's apparent throes of passion with Drefan, is able to enter the Temple. Inside, he easily cures the plague and performs several other magical spells that used to be totally beyond him. He is then visited by the spirit of Kahlan's mother, who gently tries to explain the crushing loneliness of a Confessor's life, and Richard is eventually moved to return to the real world. The spirit of Darken Rahl appears and sets conditions for his release: he must give up the knowledge of the Temple of the Winds, and is infected with the plague.

When Richard returns, Kahlan learns from writing on Richard's hands and arms that she must destroy a book in order to save Richard, so she travels to the Old World in the sliph. Upon her arrival, she finds Nathan, Sister Verna, and Warren in a compromised situation, and she immediately spring into action to aid them. Clarissa is killed in the struggle by traitors.

Kahlan returns to Aydindril with the book, but is attacked by Drefan. Instead Richard, nearly dead from the plague, manages to subdue Drefan, who is then killed by the sliph. Kahlan destroys the book, recites the names of the three chimes, and Richard is cured of the plague.

In the epilogue, members of Drefan's sect come to see Richard looking for him. They tell him that Drefan was seriously disturbed, having taken to murdering prostitutes who reminded him of his mother. Richard and Kahlan travel to the land of the Mud People to be wed, where they meet up with Zedd and Ann. Richard and Kahlan are soon thereafter wed and are visited by the witch woman Shota, who once again warns them not to conceive a child.

== Characters ==
- Richard Cypher
- Kahlan Amnell
- Zeddicus Zu'l Zorander
- Prelate Annalina
- Sister Verna
- Warren
- Cara
- Drefan Rahl
- Nadine
- Raina
- Nathan Rahl
- Emperor Jagang
- Shota

=== Wizard's Fourth Rule ===
Each of the novels in the Sword of Truth series reveals a "Wizard's Rule" — a magical principle that allows Wizards to be savvy manipulators of the world around them. The novel reveals the Wizard's Fourth Rule:

There is magic in sincere forgiveness, the magic to heal. In forgiveness you grant, but more so, in forgiveness you receive.

— Chapter 41, p. 398, U.S. hardcover edition

It is explained in the novel as follows: "Forgiving and being forgiven are powerful elements of healing for the soul. Forgiving others grants by the giving of forgiveness but more so one receives self healing by the necessity of letting go of bitterness through forgiveness of others."

== See also ==
- Dragonlance
- The Wheel of Time
- A Song of Ice and Fire
