= The Third Kingdom =

2013 fantasy novel by Terry Goodkind

- Author: Terry Goodkind
- Cover artist: Rob Anderson
- Language: English
- Series: The Sword of Truth
- Genre: Epic fantasy novel
- Publisher: Tor Books
- Publication date: August 20, 2013
- Publication place: United States
- Media type: Print (hardcover)
- Pages: 527
- ISBN: 0-7653-3599-9
- OCLC: 2013021461
- Dewey Decimal: 813/.54 23
- LC Class: PS3557.O5826 T48 2013
- Preceded by: The Omen Machine
- Followed by: Severed Souls

The Third Kingdom is the thirteenth novel in Terry Goodkind's epic fantasy series The Sword of Truth, continuing the story arc started in The Omen Machine. It was published in 2013 by Tor Books.

== Plot ==
Having survived their encounter with the Hedge Maid, Richard and Kahlan are stranded in the Dark Lands and captured by two cannibals, whom Richard repels with the help of a group of villagers sent by the boy Henrik. These people, led by a woman named Ester, hurry them to a village of caves known as Stroyza. There a young sorceress named Sammie tries to heal Kahlan but becomes hysterical when she discovers that Kahlan contains an active morbid force or 'presence of death', which she also sees in Richard. Henrik reveals that a mob attacked Richard and Kahlan's caravan and that General Meiffert, Cara, Zedd, and Nicci concealed Richard and Kahlan. They fled to divert their attackers while Henrik was ordered to find help. He also reveals that they need a containment field to be healed. The only one they know of is in the People's Palace. They are interrupted by screams and other noises of struggle, and Richard destroys a number of reanimated corpses but the exertion pushes him into unconsciousness.

Sammie heals their minor wounds but is unable to remove the death within. Though Richard awakens, Kahlan remains unconscious, and Sammie tells Richard the story of her family, including the disappearance of her mother and of the duty of the gifted people of Stroyza (which Richard reveals is High D'Haran for 'sentinel'): to watch the north wall beyond which the world of life and the world of death are united. On the other side are a people devoid of souls called the half people, created by the Emperor Sulachan in an ancient war who seek to obtain souls by eating their enemies. To rescue Richard's party, he and Sammie travel to the north wall, fighting several mobs of half people on the way. While trying to find the half people holding Richard's friends they are separated, and Bishop Hannis Arc captures Richard. Meanwhile, Kahlan wakes, and while getting information from Ester she is taken by Abbot Ludwig Dreier and his Mord-Sith Erika to Fajin Province, where he tortures people to the brink of death in an attempt to glean prophecy from them in their last moments.

In the half people's caves, Richard is imprisoned. He discovers Zedd, also imprisoned, who tells him the half people bleed him in the hope that his blood will resurrect their dead emperor. The Bishop uses his Mord-Sith Vika to force Richard into following him and uses Richard's blood to wake the dead Emperor Sulachan. The Bishop and Sulachan then lead the half people out of the third kingdom. Sulachan convinces the Bishop to kill Richard and the Abbot to secure his rule. Hannis Arc decides to send Vika to kill Richard and a band of half people to the Abbey to kill Abbot Dreier. Sammie frees Richard, who then frees his friends, the D'Haran soldiers, and Sammie's mother. While trying to escape, General Meiffert is killed, and Richard, Zedd, Nicci, Cara, and the D'Haran soldiers slaughter the half people left. Vika returns to Hannis Arc empty-handed, and the Emperor sends his trackers after the group. With an army of half people, Sulachan and Hannis Arc head to the People's Palace. Richard and his friends save Kahlan from the Abbey just as Hannis Arc's half people arrive to kill the Abbot, who escapes. Later, Richard and Kahlan say goodbye to Cara as she leaves them to grieve alone.

== See also ==
- Dragonlance
- The Wheel of Time
- A Song of Ice and Fire
