= The Omen Machine =

2011 fantasy novel by Terry Goodkind

- Author: Terry Goodkind
- Cover artist: Robert Anderson
- Language: English
- Series: The Sword of Truth
- Genre: Epic fantasy novel
- Publisher: Tor Books
- Publication date: August 16, 2011
- Publication place: United States
- Media type: Print (hardback)
- Pages: 525
- ISBN: 0-7653-2772-4
- Preceded by: Confessor
- Followed by: The Third Kingdom

The Omen Machine is the twelfth book in Terry Goodkind's epic fantasy series The Sword of Truth, and the first of a new series about Richard and Kahlan. It was published in 2011 by Tor Books and preceded by the Confessor.

== Plot ==
Richard and Kahlan are contentedly enjoying Cara's marriage when a boy named Henrik warns them of dark things to come before scratching them both and running away. Soon after, Cara warns Richard that something or someone was watching her in her room. At first unbelieving, Richard and Kahlan notice the same spooky presence on their own. Shortly after these events, prophecies are given by the most unexpected places and people, but appear equally in a book titled End Notes. After failing to reason with the delegates alarmed by these prophecies, Kahlan and Nicci frighten them into silence with a prediction invented by themselves. Meanwhile, Richard finds a strange machine underground, bearing an emblem exactly as on a wordbook for translating the language of creation, only reversed. It is later revealed that this machine is the source of all the new and strange predictions, and may be an artificial intelligence. Among the delegates is Abbot Dreier, the representative of Bishop Hannis Arc of Saavedra, who becomes the antagonist of this book and its sequels.

The scratch on Kahlan's arm worsens, and Zedd fails to heal it. When Kahlan feverishly wakes from a rest, she finds a pack of dogs surrounding her. A fight and chase then ensues until Kahlan runs away in a carriage. When Richard finds out that Kahlan is gone, he traces her footsteps and sends soldiers to find her. She is ultimately captured by a monstrous 'Hedge Maid': a macabre sorceress associated with necromancy. Richard tries to save Kahlan, but is himself captured. Richard remembers the machine's last warning, protects his and Kahlan's ears, and cuts the leather strips on the Hedge Maid's mouth, whereupon she emits a terrible shriek and dies. Richard and Kahlan are found by Nicci and Zedd, who take them to the Garden of Life to heal them.

== See also ==
- Dragonlance
- The Wheel of Time
- A Song of Ice and Fire
