= Shroud of Eternity =

Novel by Terry Goodkind

First edition (publ. Tor Books)

Shroud of Eternity is the second installment in Terry Goodkind's The Nicci Chronicles, Goodkind's new series set in the same world of his now-concluded Sword of Truth. The novel follows Death's Mistress, and was released on 9 January 2018.

Goodkind himself described the cover of the just-published novel as "laughably bad", and invited his fans to mock it, offering free copies of the book to ten randomly selected responses on Facebook. Bastien Lecouffe-Deharme identified himself as the uncredited artist, describing Goodkind's behavior as "totally disrespectful", and defending the art as "exactly what I was told to do" by the publisher. Goodkind subsequently apologized, but later characterized the work as "hackneyed", stating that the character's books were "sexist".
