= Wizard's First Rule =

1994 fantasy novel by Terry Goodkind

- Author: Terry Goodkind
- Cover artist: Doug Beekman
- Language: English
- Series: The Sword of Truth
- Genre: Epic fantasy
- Publisher: Tor Fantasy
- Publication date: August 1994
- Publication place: United States
- Media type: Print (Hardback)
- Pages: 836
- ISBN: 0-312-85705-5
- OCLC: 30547887
- Dewey Decimal: 813/.54 20
- LC Class: PS3557.O5826 W59 1994
- Preceded by: Debt of Bones
- Followed by: Stone of Tears

Wizard's First Rule, written by Terry Goodkind, is the first book in the epic fantasy series The Sword of Truth. Published by Tor Books, it was released on August 15, 1994 in hardcover, and in mass market paperback in September 1995. The book was also re-released with new cover artwork by Keith Parkinson in paperback on June 23, 2001. The novel was adapted to television in the 2008 television series Legend of the Seeker.

Goodkind had no trouble selling his first book to a publisher. "I'm sort of the exception that proves the rule", he says. "I wanted to be represented by the best agent in the country and I wrote him a letter. He asked to see the book and he liked it. He showed it to a number of publishers, and three of them had an auction. Ten weeks after I'd written 'The End', it sold for a record price ($275,000)", the most money ever paid for a fantasy novel by a first time author.

== Plot ==
Richard Cypher, a young woods guide, lives in an area of the world known as Westland, which is one of three parts of the known world, divided by magical underworld boundaries. Of the three, Westland is united under one government and contains no magic, the Midlands are a coalition of sovereign nations with magic, and past another magical boundary lies the empire of D'Hara - a single kingdom ruled by Wizards.

After the unexplained murder of his father, Richard investigates. He discovers a piece of vine in his father's house, and searches the mountains for a live part of the plant, thinking it might lead him to the murderers. He finds the plant, but it attacks him, implanting a poisonous thorn. While returning to town to find a healer, he finds a woman named Kahlan Amnell, who is being hunted by a group of assassins. Richard helps save Kahlan from the men, and learns that Kahlan is searching for the First Wizard, who is rumored to have crossed into Westland after the creation of the boundaries. Richard takes Kahlan to his best friend and mentor, Zedd. Soon after arriving, Richard collapses from the illness caused by the vine.

When Richard recovers under Zedd's care, he identifies Zedd as the First Wizard. Kahlan pleads for Zedd's help, asking for him to name a Seeker of Truth to confront Darken Rahl, the ruler of D'Hara. Rahl has activated the magical "Boxes of Orden," which, depending how they are opened, could make Rahl ruler of the world, destroy all life, or destroy himself. Kahlan believes that the "Seeker" empowered by the Sword of Truth—a magical weapon forged by the powerful wizards of old—can stop Rahl before the magic expires on the first day of winter. Zedd tests Richard, to see if he is worthy of wielding the Sword of Truth. Richard passes the test, becoming the next ”Seeker.”

Richard deduces a way to cross the boundary as a group, and with the help of a friend, the boundary warden Chase, Richard, Kahlan and Zedd travel south towards a pass in the boundary. They encounter underworldly creatures which are escaping the weakening boundary. During one of the encounters, both Chase and Zedd are injured, but Kahlan and Richard find the pass. There, they meet the bone woman Adie, who shelters Chase and Zedd, and teaches them how to go through the pass.

Kahlan and Richard journey through the pass, nearly getting killed by dangerous creatures that live there. Once through, Richard asks Kahlan to lead them to the Mud People, a tribe with the ability to contact spirit ancestors, for guidance on how to prevent Rahl from seizing the third box of Orden. To summon the ancestors, they must be full members of the tribe. During this time, Richard and Kahlan fall in love, but a secret power held by Kahlan prevents a full relationship. After convincing the Mud People that they are honorable, and seek to help all humans, Richard and Kahlan become members of tribe. The elders then summon the ancestors, which reveal that the witch woman Shota, one of the most feared people in the Midlands, can reveal the location of the third box. Darken Rahl interrupts the gathering, slaughters several Mud People and kidnaps Siddin, a tribe member and friend of Richard.

Richard and Kahlan travel to Shota's territory, where they learn that Queen Milena has the last box. Kahlan tells Richard her secret, that she is a Confessor, an enchanted person whose power of love destroys the minds of others and enslaves them. Shota also warns Richard that both Kahlan and Zedd will use their powers against him. The two travel to Tamarang, seat of Queen Milena, meeting back up with Zedd along the way. Upon reaching Tamarang, they discover that the last box is gone, and realize it was taken by Rahl.

Soon after, Richard is captured by a beautiful young Mord-Sith named Denna, who tortures him for a month. Mord-Sith wear skin-tight red leather catsuit, blood-red, to hide the blood of their captives during the training sessions. They live to torture and condition men into obedient pets, who live and breathe to please them, and Mistress Denna is the best of all Mord-Sith at this task. After only half an hour at her mercy, he is left groveling on the dungeon floor, begging to please his mistress to avoid pain. She chains him up by his wrists from the ceiling, in order to begin his 'training'. She then trains and break him into her obedient slave by the use of several instruments, including a painful small red leather rod by the name of the Agiel. Once Richard is broken, she takes him for her sexual mate. Mistress Denna reports to Darken Rahl, and Rahl hopes to force Richard to recite the Book of Counted Shadows, a magical book which Richard had memorized under the bequest of his father. However, after a month as her pet and slave, Richard's innate gentleness alters their relationship, and Richard breaks free of Denna's control. Rahl allows Richard to leave, but sets a wizard web on him which makes all of his friends think Richard is Rahl himself.

After helping a dragon named Scarlet find her egg, which had been stolen by Rahl, Richard discovers how to beat Rahl, and be with Kahlan. Kahlan, falsely thinking Richard dead by Rahl, uses her powers on him. Rahl, thinking Richard is now enslaved, uses him to recite the Book of Counted Shadows. In the end, Rahl opens the wrong Box of Orden, under Richard's false guidance, thus killing Rahl. Richard reveals he was protected from Kahlan's power by his already complete and unconditional love for her.

Zedd reveals that Richard is the progeny of Rahl's rape of Zedd's daughter. Thus, Zedd is Richard's grandfather, and Richard is the new Lord Rahl. Kahlan and Richard set off for the Mud People's village to return Siddin to his parents.

=== The Wizard's First Rule ===
Each of the novels in the Sword of Truth series reveals a "Wizard's Rule" — a magical principle that allows Wizards to be savvy manipulators of the world around them. The novel reveals the Wizard's First Rule:

"Wizard's First Rule: people are stupid." Richard and Kahlan frowned even more. "People are stupid; given proper motivation, almost anyone will believe almost anything. Because people are stupid, they will believe a lie because they want to believe it's true, or because they are afraid it might be true. People's heads are full of knowledge, facts, and beliefs, and most of it is false, yet they think it all true. People are stupid; they can only rarely tell the difference between a lie and the truth, and yet they are confident they can, and so are all the easier to fool."
"Because of Wizards First Rule, the old wizards created Confessors, and Seekers, as a means of helping find the truth, when the truth is important enough. Darken Rahl knows the Wizard's Rules. He is using the first one. People need an enemy to feel a sense of purpose. It's easy to lead people when they have a sense of purpose. Sense of purpose is more important by far than the truth. In fact, truth has no bearing in this. Darken Rahl is providing them with an enemy, other than himself, a sense of purpose. People are stupid; they want to believe, so they do."

— Chapter 36, p.560, U.S. paperback edition

== Reception ==
Terri Windling identified Wizard's First Rule as one of the best fantasy debuts of 1994, saying that although the novel was "derivative," it "does have a certain charm and earnestness about it". Kirkus Reviews called the novel "a wonderfully creative, seamless, and stirring epic fantasy debut." Booklist favorably described the novel as the "first volume of a saga" and within the "same breath as Robert Jordan" but "hardly an aspirant to Tolkien's mantle." The review also stated that "the characters and their world come to life, and Goodkind's ambitious juxtaposition of modern ambiguities and the classical fantasy setting works more often than not." Library Journal called the novel "an intriguing variant on the standard fantasy quest" recommending the novel for "mature fantasy aficionados" noting the sado-eroticism of the Mord Sith might "deter purchase by some libraries."

== TV series ==
The first season of the TV series Legend of the Seeker was based on Wizard's First Rule. Starring Craig Horner as Richard and Bridget Regan as Kahlan, the series was produced by Sam Raimi and Robert Tapert. The show expanded upon some of the themes of the book's storyline, but bore only a passing resemblance to the book on a grander scale. Terry Goodkind noted his lack of involvement and displeasure with the production in a 2019 AMA when he stated "...after Disney bought [the rights to produce the show], they didn't allow me to be involved in any way. It showed." It premiered on November 1, 2008 and ended in May 2010.

== See also ==
- Dragonlance
- The Wheel of Time
- A Song of Ice and Fire
