= Blood of the Fold =

1996 fantasy book by Terry Goodkind

- Author: Terry Goodkind
- Cover artist: Kevin Murphy
- Language: English
- Series: The Sword of Truth
- Genre: Epic fantasy
- Publisher: Tor Fantasy
- Publication date: October 15, 1996
- Publication place: United States
- Media type: Print (Hardback)
- Pages: 623
- ISBN: 0-312-89052-4
- OCLC: 34677241
- Dewey Decimal: 813/.54 20
- LC Class: PS3557.O5826 B57 1996
- Preceded by: Stone of Tears
- Followed by: Temple of the Winds

Blood of the Fold is the third book in Terry Goodkind's epic fantasy series The Sword of Truth. It was published in 1996 by Tor Books and preceded by the Stone of Tears.

== Plot ==
Blood of the Fold resumes from the preceding novel, Stone of Tears, when Richard Rahl has just reunited with his future wife, Kahlan Amnell, the Mother Confessor, in a place between worlds. Upon returning to Aydindril in the real world, he realizes that seizing power for himself is the only way to halt the continuous advance of the Imperial Order through the Midlands. Richard ends the Midlands alliance and the rule of the Confessors, taking control of Aydindril and issuing a demand for unconditional surrender of Midlands nations to D'haran rule.

Meanwhile, in the Old World, trouble courses through the Palace of the Prophets. Sister Verna, the newly named Prelate, discovers the former Prelate, Annalina, is not really dead, but has fled with Nathan Rahl.

The lands of the Midlands must decide whether to surrender to D'Hara or the Imperial Order. In his neverending search for banelings, what the Blood call those with some form of the gift, Tobias Brogan, the Lord General of the Blood of the Fold, captures Kahlan Amnell and Adie and takes them, following the instructions of the Creator, to the Palace of the Prophets.

Richard, who finds out his wife-to-be is in the Old World, uses an ancient means of transportation, the Sliph, to travel to her almost immediately. There, fooled by the ability to become invisible, he releases the Mriswith Queen, who then flees to Aydindril back through the Sliph.

Brought back to his senses, Richard then destroys the Palace of the Prophets to prevent Jagang from receiving the treasures inside, saves Kahlan, and hurries back to Aydindril in the New World, where he discovers the mriswith queen nesting in the Wizard's Keep preparing to hatch a new batch of mriswith in the New World. After smashing her eggs and a difficult battle with her, Richard and Kahlan defeat the Mriswith Queen. They then discover a battle in the City is being lost by Richard's D'haran army but with his arrival he leads his soldiers to a victory over the Blood of the Fold and the mriswith.

=== Wizard's Third Rule ===
Each of the novels in the Sword of Truth series reveals a "Wizard's Rule" — a magical principle that allows Wizards to be savvy manipulators of the world around them. The novel reveals the Wizard's Third Rule:

Passion rules reason.

— Chapter 43, pg number varies, U.S. hardcover edition

It is explained in the novel as follows: "Letting your emotions control your reason may cause trouble for yourself and those around you."

== Reception ==
Booklist states that Blood of the Fold "boasts by far the most action--for the most part well done, whether with swords or sorcery--in any of the Sword installments to date."

== See also ==
- Dragonlance
- The Wheel of Time
- A Song of Ice and Fire
