= The Pillars of Creation =

2001 fantasy novel by Terry Goodkind

- Author: Terry Goodkind
- Cover artist: Keith Parkinson
- Language: English
- Series: The Sword of Truth
- Genre: Epic fantasy
- Publisher: Tor Fantasy
- Publication date: November 2001
- Publication place: United States
- Media type: Print (Hardback)
- Pages: 557
- ISBN: 0-7653-0026-5
- OCLC: 48247406
- Dewey Decimal: 813/.54 21
- LC Class: PS3557.O5826 P45 2001
- Preceded by: Faith of the Fallen
- Followed by: Naked Empire

The Pillars of Creation is the seventh book in Terry Goodkind's epic fantasy series The Sword of Truth. It was published in 2001 by Tor Books and preceded by the Faith of the Fallen. It is the first book in the series not to feature Richard Rahl as the protagonist (although he does appear).

== Plot ==
Jennsen Rahl, Richard Rahl's half sister, has spent the first twenty years of her life running from her father, Darken Rahl. Born without any aspect of the gift of magic, Jennsen has been marked for death since birth. When her mother is apparently murdered by D'Haran assassins, she sets out with her new friend, Sebastian, to start her life over. Sebastian eventually reveals that he is a spy for the Imperial Order. He speaks convincingly of the Order's goals concerning the fair treatment of all humanity and the elimination of magic. Above all else, he esteems Emperor Jagang. In equal measure, he despises Richard Rahl, who he claims has brought on war with an invasion of the Old World after bringing down the Barriers separating the sections of the known world.

Meanwhile, another sibling of Richard's, Oba Rahl, suffers under an abusive mother on the family farm. Oba imagines himself as energetic and the possessor of a healthy curiosity. His inquisitive nature manifests itself especially through pleasure in watching things die under his hand. Oba does not know that he, along with Jennsen, is pristinely ungifted and immune to magic. His mother sends him to a nearby sorceress to buy medicine, and, during the purchase, he begins to menace the magic user. Her attempts to defend herself with magic fail and Oba kills her brutally. During the fight, Oba surrenders to a voice in his mind that promises invincibility in return for obedience. After returning home, Oba kills his mother and resolves to see the world. He can travel comfortably with the funds he looted from the sorceress.

Jennsen wants to find another sorceress, the sister of the one Oba killed, and who had previously helped Jennsen and her mother. Along with Sebastian, she travels to the People's Palace, capital of the D'Haran empire. There she learns that the sorceress she seeks lives in a deadly enchanted swamp. After Sebastian is detained by D'Haran guards, a friendly stranger named Tom helps a desperate Jennsen to the swamp. She safely reaches the sorceress' home, her natural immunity to magic protecting her through the swamp, but only learns that nothing can be done to save her from Lord Rahl. She leaves, disappointed. However, upon returning to the People's Palace, she cleverly rescues Sebastian. He convinces her that she should visit Emperor Jagang, leader of the Imperial Order.

Oba is also aware of the second sorceress and the fact that she knows something concerning his fate or nature. He hires a guide to the swamp, which he safely negotiates as well. The sorceress reveals that Oba is now a thrall to the Keeper of the Underworld and kills herself before Oba can do the deed. This, along with the fact that his guide has stolen all his money, enrages Oba. He is mollified somewhat by the treasure he finds in the sorceresses' cottage, but his rage returns when, after returning to the People's Palace, he spots his guide. After killing the guide, he is briefly jailed but escapes, using the voice in his mind to make the D'Haran guards do his bidding, and resolves to locate Richard Rahl.

Jennsen and Sebastian reach Emperor Jagang at the van of the army of the Imperial Order. Though initially shocked by the crude Order soldiers, she is advised not to be so picky and that the D'Harans are even worse. The day after her arrival, the Emperor Jagang assaults the Confessor's Palace but is bloodily repulsed. Emperor Jagang is severely injured in the action. Even worse for the Order, their enemy unleashes an ancient magic on the main army, wreaking immense destruction. Jennsen reacts by making a pact with a dark force, the Keeper, to kill Richard in return for her surrender and obedience.

Oba captures Kahlan and is ordered by the Keeper to take her, along with the Sword of Truth, to the Pillars of Creation. Using his link to the sword, Richard pursues Oba to the Pillars, where he encounters Jennsen, who has also been drawn to the same spot by the Keeper in order to kill Richard. The Keeper's supreme plan, however, was for Richard to kill Jennsen at the Pillars of Creation and thereby open a gate between the Keeper's realm and the world of the living. Richard discerns the plan and refuses to be goaded into cooperating. Jennsen recognizes his integrity and the Keeper's plan is foiled. She learns that the men who were sent to kill her mother were actually soldiers of the Imperial Order, and after coming to believe that Richard is truly a loving and caring brother, she joins him and Kahlan in their quest against Jagang.

=== Wizard's Seventh Rule ===
Each of the novels in the Sword of Truth series reveals a "Wizard's Rule" — a magical principle that allows Wizards to be savvy manipulators of the world around them. The novel reveals the Wizard's Seventh Rule:

Life is the future, not the past.

— Chapter 60, p. 549, U.S. hardcover edition

It is explained in the novel as follows: "The past can teach us, through experience, how to accomplish things in the future, comfort us with cherished memories, and provide the foundation of what has already been accomplished. But only the future holds life. To live in the past is to embrace what is dead. To live life to its fullest, each day must be created anew. As rational, thinking beings we must use our intellect, not a blind devotion to what has come before, to make rational choices."

== Reception and reviews ==
Publishers Weekly had this to say in their review of The Pillars of Creation: "Amid the interminable sword-and-sorcery in the tradition of Robert E. Howard, the author spouts his familiar political pieties. Lip service may be paid to public good, but passion arises only in scenes of violence. For all its clumsy exposition, unlikely coincidences and feeble attempts at humor, this latest installment, with its striking jacket art showing a beautiful desert landscape, is as certain to please Goodkind's legions of fans as previous books in the series."

== See also ==
- Dragonlance
- The Wheel of Time
- A Song of Ice and Fire
