= The First Confessor: The Legend of Magda Searus =

2012 book by Terry Goodkind

- First edition
- Author: Terry Goodkind
- Language: English
- Series: The Sword of Truth
- Genre: Epic fantasy
- Publisher: Self-published / FINE Group
- Publication date: July 2, 2012
- Publication place: United States
- Media type: Limited Print (hardcover), E-book
- Pages: 481
- ISBN: 978-0-615-65101-9

The First Confessor: The Legend of Magda Searus is the fifteenth novel in Terry Goodkind's epic fantasy series The Sword of Truth, set centuries prior to the events of the main storyline. It is the first book that was self-published by the author. Apart from 300 individually-numbered copies of a Limited Collector's Edition, it was originally exclusively available as E-book and Audiobook. Since July 2015, it was published by Tor Fantasy in hardcover format. A paperback version was released a year later by the same publisher.

== Publication ==
The novel was the first one self-published by Goodkind in only digital versions. Available in multiple digital formats, the novel quickly became popular topping Amazon's bestsellers list.

After outing a fan who distributed illegal versions of the novel on his Facebook page, Goodkind encouraged his fans to attack the pirate in other forums to discourage other vandalism. According to The Guardian, the harassed fan was forced to go underground due to the mob mentality.

== Introduction ==
A short description of the book was released on the author's official website, which reads:

"The First Confessor is the foundation of the Sword of Truth series. This is the beginning of the grand adventure."

== Characters ==
- Magda Searus, major character in The First Confessor, the first Confessor.
- Merritt, major character in The First Confessor, the first Confessor's wizard.
- Lothain, major character in The First Confessor, Head Prosecutor.
- Baraccus, the late husband of Magda Searus. Former First Wizard.
- Tilly: Servant of Magda Searus.
- Isodore: Sorceress and spiritist.
- Quinn: Wizard assigned to watch over the Sliph. Childhood friend of Magda Searus.
- Alric Rahl: Leader of D'Hara.
- Sadler: Council member in Aydindril.
- Elder Cadell: Council member in Aydindril.
- Guymer: Council member in Aydindril.
- Councilman Weston: Council member in Aydindril.
- Councilman Hambrook: Council member in Aydindril.
- Sulachan: Emperor of the Old World and antagonist.
- Naja Moon: A defected spiritist from the Old World.

== See also ==
- Dragonlance
- The Wheel of Time
- A Song of Ice and Fire
