= List of books published by Ring of Fire Press =

The Ring of Fire Press was created in 2013 to release material in the 1632 series that was originally published as serials over successive issues of The Grantville Gazettes magazine. Beginning in 2018, they had released original material in the 1632 series, and had published other works.

On August 16, 2022, Lucille Robbins, the widow of Eric Flint, officially announced the immediate shutdown of both The Grantville Gazette and the Ring of Fire Press. Without a huge infusion of new cash, it was determined that both business ventures would not be economically viable without Flint's participation. As a result, all titles became out-of-print; ebook distribution had ceased, and the limited pre-existing stock of new paper editions at authorized retailers will disappear soon.

Some authors, such as Bjorn Hasseler and Virginia DeMarce, have made arrangements with Baen Books to have Baen republish and distribute their books, while other authors, such as Gorg Huff and Paula Goodlett, have decided on the self-publishing route via Amazon (which limit distributions to third-party resellers). Since not all authors have found a new publisher, some titles might remain out-of-print for some time.

== Time Spike books ==
In October 2018, the Ring of Fire Press began releasing novels that are part of the Time Spike series that were previously published as serials in the Grantville Gazette.

Ring of Fire Press – Time Spike books
Title	Publication date	Authors	ISBN	Notes
Time Spike: The Mysterious Mesa	October 2018	Garrett W. Vance	978-1956015850	Originally published as a serial in 11 parts in Gazette volumes 39–60 that is set in the Cretaceous Period of Time Spike that involved a U.S. cavalryman from 1838 and a Spanish soldier from 1540. Republished in 2026 by Baen Books. 978-1-964856-18-6
Time Spike: The First Cavalry of the Cretaceous	June 2022	Garrett W. Vance	978-1948818179	Sequel to Time Spike: The Mysterious Mesa that was originally published as a serial in 9 parts in Gazette volumes 62–99. Will be Republished in March 2026 by Baen Books.

== Queen of the Seas books ==
In August 2021, the Ring of Fire Press began releasing novels that are part of the Queen of the Seas series.

Ring of Fire Press – Queen of the Seas books
Title	Publication date	Authors	ISBN	Notes
The Sicilian Coil	September 2021	Gorg Huff and Paula Goodlett	978-1956015140	The appearance of the cruise ship Queen of the Seas just after the death of Alexander the Great had shaken up the third century BCE world. The Roman Senate did not like the idea that their "republic" was destined to become a dictatorship and its Italian neighbors did not like the idea that they would lose their autonomy and be absorb by the then Roman city state. This book is centered on the power play occurring in the Italian peninsula while the ship people cruise back and forth from Trinidad and the Eastern Mediterranean. This title was privately re-released by the authors via Amazon in September 2022 (ISBN 979-8354924882).

== Non-Assiti Shards books ==
In April 2017, the Ring of Fire Press began releasing novels that were not a part of either the 1632 or Assiti Shards book series.

Ring of Fire Press – non-Assiti Shards books
Title	Publication date	Authors	ISBN	Series	Notes
Incident in Alaska Prefecture	April 2017	Stoney Compton	978-1-5450-8977-4	Prefecture	A novel set in Japanese-occupied Alaska 22 years after the Axis powers had won World War II. This title was re-released by Nazca Press in August 2025 (ISBN 978-1963479942).
The Demons of Paris	March 2018	Eric Flint, Gorg Huff, and Paula Goodlett	978-1-9803-4414-8	Demon Rift	The first book in the Demon Rift series involving 21st century high school students in a van, 14th century Paris, and demons taking control of mechanical and electronic devices. This title was privately re-released by the authors via Amazon in February 2023 (ISBN 979-8378075225).
Pandora's Crew	June 2018	Gorg Huff and Paula Goodlett	978-1983099175	StarWings	Space opera novel that include corporate intrigue, enhanced humans, artificial brains, and space pirates; first book of the StarWings series. This title was privately re-released by the authors via Amazon in October 2022 (ISBN 979-8360672722).
Emergence	June 2018	David R. Palmer	978-1948818063	Stand-alone	Reprint of award-winning novel that was first published in 1984. This title was re-released by Histria SciFi & Fantasy in July 2023 (ISBN 979-8888602041).
The Masks of Mirada	July 2018	Robert E. Waters	978-1948818094	Mask Cycle	Sword and magic novel; first book of the Mask Cycle series.
Demons of the Past: Revolution	October 2018	Ryk E. Spoor	978-1948818131	Demons of the Past	Second book in Spoor's Demons of the Past series. This title was re-released by Untreed Reads Publishing in November 2023 (ISBN 979-8888601617).
Perdition	October 2018	Marella Sands	978-1948818155	Perdition	An alternate history in which the United States had fragmented into several smaller independent countries after the Union allowed the secession by the Southern States after four bloody years of conflict to end the Civil War and how things had changed by the 21st century. This title was re-released by Untreed Reads Publishing in August 2023 (ISBN 979-8888601419).
Threshold	November 2018	David R. Palmer	978-1948818193	Stand-alone	Reprint of a novel that was first published in 1985. This title was re-released by Histria SciFi & Fantasy in July 2023 (ISBN 979-8888601983).
Big Stick	November 2018	Michael A. Ventrella	978-1948818216	Stand-alone	A steampunk alternate history that involves Teddy Roosevelt and a number of other notables at the end of the nineteenth century. This title was re-released by Fantastic Books in November 2022 (ISBN 978-1515447870).
WarSpell: The Merge	December 2018	Gorg Huff and Paula Goodlett	978-1948818230	WarSpell	A group of tabletop RPG players "merge" with the characters they've played, gaining new memories and magical powers. First book in the WarSpell series This title was privately re-released by the authors via Amazon in January 2023 (ISBN 979-8373305310).
Demons of the Past: Retribution	March 2019	Ryk E. Spoor	978-1948818278	Demons of the Past	Third and final book in his Demons of the Past series. This title was re-released by Untreed Reads Publishing in October 2023 (ISBN 979-8888601655).
Legend	March 2019	Ryk E. Spoor	978-1948818292	Stand-alone	Psychotic Super heroes.
Lost Signals of the Terran Republic	March 2019	Charles E. Gannon (editor)	978-1948818247	Terran Republic	An anthology containing short stories from different authors that are set in the universe of Gannon's Terran Republic series. This title was re-released by Beyond Terra Press in November 2020 (ISBN 978-1648550980).
Death Lives in the Water	April 2019	Shoshana Edwards	978-1948818315	Stand-alone	Supernatural rural police mystery.
Ganny Knits a Spaceship	April 2019	David Gerrold	978-1948818339	Stand-alone	A space opera from an established SF author and screenwriter who has written episodes of the original Star Trek series. Based upon a 2009 short story of the same name that was first published in Jim Baen's Universe.
The Vampiress of Londinium	May 2019	Gorg Huff and Paula Goodlett	978-1948818377	WarSpell	Second book in the WarSpell series. A fictional vampire merges with a sixty-two-year-old grandmother. This title was privately re-released by the authors via Amazon in October 2022 (ISBN 979-8357447982).
Twilight of Empire	June 2019	Stoney Compton	978-1948818414	Prefecture	Sequel to Incident in Alaska Prefecture; second book in series
Tracking	June 2019	David R. Palmer	978-1948818391	Stand-alone	Reprint as a single volume of a trilogy of short stories that were first published in Analog magazine in 2008; sequel to Emergence.
Venus, Mars and Hell	July 2019	John Lambshead and Eric Flint	978-1948818476	Stand-alone	Another space opera. Starships, spirit guides, black magic and the problem of the correct sequence of cutlery usage in the Officer's Mess.
City by the Bay: Stories of Novaya Rossiya	July 2019	Walter H. Hunt	978-1948818452	Stand-alone	An anthology of novellas and short stories of an alternative history in which the Spanish abandon Northern California to the Russians during the early 19th century and the growth of Russian St. Helena, on the site our San Francisco, from 1816 to 1906.
Special Education: To Halt Armageddon	August 2019	David R. Palmer	978-1948818513	Tracking	The long waited sequel to Tracking; was completed 20 years ago, but remained unpublished until 2019. This title was re-released by Histria SciFi & Fantasy in July 2023 (ISBN 979-8888602027).
The Company Man	September 2019	Edward M. Lerner	978-1948818537	Stand-alone	Original published in six parts as a continuing serial in the Universe Annex section of the Grantville Gazette from volume 71 to volume 83. This title was re-released by Phoenix Pick in March 2023 (ISBN 978-1649731296).
Purgatory	October 2019	Marella Sands	978-1948818575	Perdition	Sequel to Perdition, an alternative world in which the Confederacy had survived to modern times as one of many small successor states that resulted from the break-up of the United States after the Civil War in which the Confederates won their independence. This title was re-released by Untreed Reads Publishing in November 2023 (ISBN 979-8888601457).
Everything Works in Theory	October 2019	K.B. Bogen	978-1948818599	Stand-alone	Paranormal & Urban Fantasy
London Days, Demon Nights	November 2019	John Lambshead	978-1948818612	Stand-alone	Vampires and demons in 21st century London.
Arachne's Webs	December 2019	Gorg Huff and Paula Goodlett	978-1948818650	StarWings	Second book in the StarWings series; sequel to Pandora's Crew. This title was privately re-released by the authors via Amazon in November 2022 (ISBN 979-8363775956).
Bloodsuckers: A Vampire Runs for President	December 2019	Michael A. Ventrella	978-1948818698	Stand-alone	Another vampire book. Blood suckers in Washington D.C. This title was re-released by Fantastic Books in October 2024 (ISBN 978-1515458289).
The Thief of Cragsport	February 2020	Robert E Waters	978-1948818766	Mast Cycle	Second book in The Mask Cycle series; sequel to The Masks of Mirada
The Rat Rebellion	March 2020	Paula Goodlett and Gorg Huff	978-1948818735	StarWings	Third book in the StarWings series; not a real sequel, but a semi-independent story in the same universe about a woman stranded on a space station who eventually starts a revolution among the station's underprivileged known as "station rats". This title was privately re-released by the authors via Amazon in November 2022 (ISBN 979-8365867253).
A Song of Passing	March 2020	David Carrico	978-1948818780	Stand-alone	Another sword and sorcery book.
Diamonds Are Forever	March 2020	Eric Flint and Ryk E. Spoor	978-1948818827	Stand-alone	A reissue. Story originally published by Baen in the 2004 anthology Mountain Magic.
Blood's Call	April 2020	David Carrico	978-1948818841	Stand-alone	A Scottish sword and sorcery novel. This title was re-released by Baen Books in August 2025 (ISBN 978-1964856148).
The Demons of Constantinople	May 2020	Eric Flint, Gorg Huff, and Paula Goodlett	978-1948818889	Demon Rift	Second book in the Demon Rift series; sequel to The Demons of Paris This title was privately re-released by the authors via Amazon in March 2023 (ISBN 979-8387156922).
Dark Day, Bright Hour	May 2020	Julie Frost	978-1948818865	Stand-alone	A hitman and an innocent woman find themselves in Hell. This title was privately re-released by the author via Amazon in April 2024 (ISBN 979-8884370630).
The Mask of Ares	June 2020	Ryk E. Spoor	978-1948818902	Godswar	First book in the Godswar series. This title was re-released by Histria SciFi & Fantasy in March 2026 (ISBN 978-1592116904).
Blood's Cost	June 2020	David Carrico	978-1948818926	Blood's Call	Sequel to Blood's Call This title was re-released by Baen Books in September 2025 (ISBN 978-1964856155).
After Hastings	June 2020	Steven H Silver	978-1948818940	Stand-alone	An alternate history in which Harold Godwinson prevented the Norman conquest of Britain by defeating William the Conqueror at the Battle of Hastings. This is Silver's first novel. This title was re-released by Phoenix Pick in May 2023 (ISBN 978-1649731272).
Perfection	July 2020	Marella Sands	978-1948818964	Perdition	A sequel to both Purgatory and Perdition in which the United States had fragmented into a series of small nations after the Confederacy left the Union at the end of the Civil War. This title was re-released by Untreed Reads Publishing in August 2023 (ISBN 979-8888601419).
The Newton Cipher	July 2020	Steve Ruskin	978-1948818988	Trina Piper Thrillers	First book in the Trina Piper Thrillers series. A historian is involved in a mystery, with unexplained murders, involving a coded manuscript from Sir Isaac Newton. This title was privately re-released by the author via Amazon in June 2023 (ISBN 979-8399267043).
The Portals of Hell	August 2020	Nathan Dodge	978-1953034021	Portals	Monsters coming through a just opened portal. This title was re-released by Novus Mundi Publishing in March 2024 (ISBN 978-1961511453).
Marked Territory	August 2020	Neal F. Litherland	978-1953034045	Stand-alone	Fantasy mystery novel involving a cat that can talk to mice and other species.
Heart of the World	August 2020	Cecelia Holland	978-1953034069	Stand-alone	A historical fiction about characters who were involved during the Siege of Bagdad of 1258 by the Mongols. This title was re-released by Untreed Reads Publishing in December 2023 (ISBN 978-1611879087).
Stand by for Mars (Tom Corbett, Space Cadet)	September 2020	Carey Rockwell	978-1953034090	Tom Corbett, Space Cadet	A reprint of a 1952 pulp classic.
Border Crosser	September 2020	Tom Doyle	978-1953034144	Stand-alone	Another space opera. This title was re-released by TMD House in September 2020 (ISBN 979-8987900406).
Jamaica Blue Magic	September 2020	Kathleen Moffre-Spoor and Ryk E. Spoor	978-1953034120	Fall of Veils series	Monster hunting in Jamaica. Second book in the Fall of Veils series
The Dragon's Boy	September 2020	David Carrico	978-1953034168	Dragon Wizard	Dragons! First book in The Dragon Wizard series This title was re-released by Baen Books in October 2025 (ISBN 978-1964856162).
Old Nathan	October 2020	David Drake	978-1953034182	Stand-alone	Magic in Appalachia
Blood of a Nation	October 2020	Wayland Smith	978-1953034243	Stand-alone	The blood drinking undead gets involved in the American War of Independence.
Nevada Rails	November 2020	Cecelia Holland	978-1953034267	Stand-alone	Historical fiction set in lawless 19th century California. Appears to be a reprint of Holland's 1997 novel Railroad Schemes, or at least set in the same universe. This title was re-released by Untreed Reads Publishing in July 2023 (ISBN 978-1611879155).
The Portals of Spring	November 2020	Nathan Dodge	978-1953034304	Portals	A second portals book. This title was re-released by Novus Mundi Publishing in October 2023 (ISBN 978-1961511477).
From the Ashes of a Dead World	November 2020	Shane Gries	978-1953034328	Ashes Saga	Another space opera. First book in the Ashes Saga series. This title was privately re-published under the new title Oasis: Last World Volume I in July 2023 (ISBN 979-8344484266).
Treadwell: A novel of Alaska Territory	November 2020	Stoney Compton	978-1953034342	Gastineau Channel Quartet	Reprint of an Alaskan historic fiction novel from Stoney Compton.
The Dragon's Apprentice	December 2020	David Carrico	978-1953034366	Dragon Wizard	Second book in The Dragon Wizard series. This title was re-released by Baen Books in November 2025 (ISBN 978-1964856179).
WarSpell: Space Race	December 2020	Gorg Huff and Paula Goodlett	978-1953034380	WarSpell	Third book in the WarSpell series. This title was privately re-released by the authors via Amazon in January 2023 (ISBN 979-8374090079).
Tools of the Trade	December 2020	Wayland Smith	978-1953034427	Stand-alone	A deal that a widower with powerful mystical beings to revenge his wife's death at the hand of a drunk driver comes at a steep cost. This title was re-released by Untreed Reads Publishing in December 2023 (ISBN 979-8888601211).
The Angel and the Sword	January 2021	Cecelia Holland	978-1953034465	reprint	Vikings attack ninth century Paris. Reprint of a historical fiction that was first published in 2000.
Crawlspace: and Other Stories	January 2021	Dave Freer and Eric Flint	978-1953034496	Rats, Bats and Vats series	Anthology of short stories; reprint.
The Portals of Summer	January 2021	Nathan Dodge	978-1953034489	Portals	Third book in the Portals series. This title was re-released by Novus Mundi Publishing in October 2023 (ISBN 978-1961511491).
Colony High	February 2021	David Brin	978-1953034526	High Horizon	High students and aliens. First book of the High Horizon series. This title was re-released by New Worlds Publishing in June 2023 (ISBN 978-1961511132).
Anoria	February 2021	Gorg Huff and Paula Goodlett	978-1953034540	A Family of Wizards	Orphan girls and magic. First book in A Family of Wizards series. This title was privately re-released by the authors via Amazon in September 2022 (ISBN 979-8352171370).
The Spear of Athena	February 2021	Ryk E. Spoor	978-1953034564	Godswar	Second book in the Godswar series. This title was re-released by Histria SciFi & Fantasy in March 2026 (ISBN 978-1592116911). This title was re-released by Histria SciFi & Fantasy in March 2026 (ISBN 978-1592116911).
The Dragon's Wizard	February 2021	David Carrico	978-1953034588	Dragon Wizard	Third book in The Dragon Wizard series. This title was re-released by Baen Books in December 2025 (ISBN 978-1964856186).
Daggers in Darkness	March 2021	S. M. Stirling	978-1953034595	Treasures of Tartary	First book in the Treasures of Tartary trilogy, which is the sequel to the Tales from the Black Chamber trilogy, an alternate history in which Teddy Roosevelt served a third term as president of a United States which had annexed Canada and Mexico. Appears to be re-released by Baen.
The Bear Flag	March 2021	Cecelia Holland	978-1953034625	Stand-alone	Historical novel set during the Californian Bear Flag Rebellion from Mexico.
I, One	March 2021	Nathan B. Dodge	978-1953034663	Stand-alone	A tale about a self-aware android. This title was re-released by New Worlds Publishing in July 2023 (ISBN 978-1961511118).
French Roast Apocalypse	April 2021	Kathleen Moffre-Spoor and Ryk E. Spoor	978-1953034687	Fall of Veils series	Monsters in a Paris coffeehouse. First book in the Fall of Veils series.
The Melody of Memory	April 2021	Cheryl Brin	978-1953034700	Stand-alone	A tale about a dystopian colony world. This title was re-released by New Worlds Publishing in June 2023 (ISBN 978-1961511019).
Pacific Street	April 2021	Cecelia Holland	978-1953034748	Stand-alone	Historical novel set in San Francisco during the 1849 Gold Rush.
From the Ashes of Interstellar Empire	April 2021	Shane Gries	978-1953034724	Ashes Saga	Second book in the Ashes Saga series. This title was privately re-published under the new title Oasis: Last World Volume II in November 2023 (ISBN 979-8344908496).
Born in Magic: Cordelia Cooper: Book One	April 2021	Gorg Huff and Paula Goodlett	978-1953034762	A Family of Wizards	Second book (prequel) in A Family of Wizards series. This title was privately re-released by the authors via Amazon in December 2022 (ISBN 979-8371592811).
The Sherlock Chronicles & The Paradise Quartet	May 2021	Edward M. Lerner	978-1953034809	Stand-alone	Two novelas, one about A.I.s and other about the results of colonization of an exoplanet. This title was privately re-released by the author via Amazon in December 2022 (ISBN 979-8366423885).
Painted Cats	May 2021	Neal F. Litherland	978-1953034823	unnamed cat series	Further adventures of Leo the cat. A catastrophic sequel to Marked Territory. This title was re-released by Untreed Reads Publishing in December 2023 (ISBN 979-8888601273).
Shadows of Hyperion	May 2021	Ryk E. Spoor	978-1953034847	Arenaverse	Fourth book in the Arenaverse series. This title was re-released by Histria in June 2025 (ISBN 978-1592116300).
11,000 Years	May 2021	Mark Roth-Whitworth	978-1953034861	Stand-alone	Another space opera. This title was re-released by New Worlds Publishing in July 2023 (ISBN 978-1961511156).
Megan Thomas Forensic Sorceress	June 2021	Bradley H. Sinor	978-1953034885	Stand-alone	CSI with magic.
WarSpell: Miss Midshipman Teasdale	June 2021	Gorg Huff and Paula Goodlett	978-1953034946	WarSpell (Tensy Teasdale)	Fourth book in the WarSpell series. This title was privately re-released by the authors via Amazon in October 2022 (ISBN 979-8358213111).
Old Soldiers	June 2021	Neal F. Litherland	978-1953034960	Stand-alone	Military space opera. This title was re-released by New Worlds Publishing in July 2023 (ISBN 978-1961511095).
Sit, Stay, Kill	July 2021	Kate Dane	978-1956015027	Stand-alone	A woman discovered that the abused dog that she had rescued is actually a handsome werewolf that she can magically control. This title was re-released by Fire Oak Publishing in July 2021 (ISBN 978-1959771012).
Demon Lord of Elysium	July 2021	Gorg Huff and Paula Goodlett	978-1956015041	Demon Rift	Third book in the Demon Rift series. This title was privately re-released by the authors via Amazon in March 2023 (ISBN 979-8388338846).
Demons of the Past: Revelation	July 2021	Ryk E. Spoor	978-1956015065	Demons of the Past	Reprint of the first book in Spoor's Demons of the Past series. This title was re-released by Untreed Reads Publishing in October 2023 (ISBN 979-8888601631).
Subway in the Sky	August 2021	Nathan B. Dodge	978-1956015096	Subway Trilogy	A trio of engineers developed a system of stable wormholes which allow people to travel the Solar System without the need of vehicles. What can go wrong? Alien invasions. Martial strife. Workplace romance. First book of Dodge's Subway Trilogy. This title was re-released by New Worlds Publishing in October 2023 (ISBN 978-1961511392).
Castaways of New Mojave	August 2021	David Brin and Jeff Carlson	978-1956015126	High Horizon	Second book of the High Horizon series. This title was re-released by Novus Mundi Publishing in October 2023 (ISBN 978-1961511514).
Schrödinger's Frisbee	September 2021	David R. Palmer	978-1953034922	stand-alone	After being in limbo for 13 years, Schrödinger's Frisbee has finally been released! It is a story about "a boy and his dog, his girlfriend – and alien abduction". This title was re-released by Untreed Reads Publishing in December 2023 (ISBN 979-8888602010).
Schooled in Magic: Cordelia Cooper Book 2	September 2021	Gorg Huff and Paula Goodlett	978-1956015164	A Family of Wizards	Third book in A Family of Wizards series and the second book in the Cordelia Cooper sub-series. This title was privately re-released by the authors via Amazon in January 2023 (ISBN 979-8372421615).
From the Ashes of Armageddon	September 2021	Shane Gries	978-1956015188	Ashes Saga	Third book and final in the Ashes Saga series. This title was privately re-published under the new title Oasis: Last World Volume III in November 2024 (ISBN 979-8345665268).
Paradigms Lost	October 2021	Ryk E. Spoor	978-1956015201	stand-alone	A expanded re-write of a previous published book.
Backfire	October 2021	J. Dharma Windham	978-1956015225	stand-alone	A mystery novel about the U.S. Navy and a mysterious top-secret U.S. government agency trying to recover a secret device that is on board a shipwreck at the bottom of the world's deepest oceanic trench. This title was re-released by Untreed Reads Publishing as Raise the Nautilus in April 2024 (ISBN 979-8888602072).
Jack	October 2021	Cecelia Holland	978-1956015249	stand-alone	Historical fiction about a young woman named Jenny who secretly joins the Continental Army in the Summer of 1776 disguised as a young man named Jack after the British fleet showed up to disembark to large army near her family's home on Long Island. This title was re-released by Untreed Reads Publishing in December 2023 (ISBN 978-1611879131).
Subway to the Stars	November 2021	Nathan B. Dodge	978-1956015263	Subway Trilogy	Alien invasion by giant space bugs via artificial wormholes! Second book of Dodge's Subway Trilogy. This title was re-released by New Worlds Publishing in August 2023 (ISBN 978-1961511415).
Reluctant Goddess	November 2021	J. Dharma Windham	978-1956015287	The Kleopatra Chronicles	First book in The Kleopatra Chronicles. Egyptian Gods and demons walk the Earth in Macedonian Egypt. This is a story of a Ptolemaic princess who called the powers of the ancient Egyptian Gods to help her restore order in a time of chaos and destruction. This title was re-released by New Worlds Publishing in October 2023 (ISBN 978-1961511255).
A Grand Imperial War	November 2021	Ray Tabler	978-1956015300	stand-alone	Another space opera. This title was re-released by Novus Mundi Publishing in October 2023 (ISBN 978-1961511033).
WarSpell: The Orclands (Game of Freedom Book 1)	December 2021	Gorg Huff and Paula Goodlett	978-1956015348	WarSpell (Game of Freedom)	Fifth book in the WarSpell series and the first in the "Game of Freedom" sub-series. This title was privately re-released by the authors via Amazon in November 2022 (ISBN 979-8362657451).
The Sword and the Serpent	December 2021	J. Dharma Windham	978-1956015362	The Kleopatra Chronicles	Second book in The Kleopatra Chronicles. Romans get involved in the Egyptian civil war between Kleopatra's father and the usurper Queen Berenike and the Egyptian gods are not very happy. This title was re-released by Novus Mundi Publishing in November 2023 (ISBN 978-1961511279).
Nick Klaus: A WarSpell Christmas story	December 2021	Gorg Huff and Paula Goodlett	No ISBN	WarSpell	A free e-book in the WarSpell series. The various fictional incarnations of Santa Claus, Saint Nicholas, and their pagan predecessors merged to form the character Nick Claus while a RGP player gets merged with a toy making elf character. A Saturnalia gift from the authors to their WarSpell readers. Download the ebook (epub, mobi, pdf, or rtf) free via Archive.org.
No Place to Die	December 2021	Roger Kelly Smith	978-1956015423	stand-alone	A cold-war military science fiction thriller similar to the style of Tom Clancy or Ian Fleming in which a near-future 21st century China instead of mid-20th century Soviet Union is used as the primary military foe to the United States. This title was re-released by New Worlds Publishing in June 2023 (ISBN 978-1961511071).
Phoenix Rising	January 2022	Ryk E. Spoor	978-1956015461	Balanced Sword	Reprint of his fantasy classic.
Hellflower	February 2022	Rosemary Edghill	978-1956015508	Hellflower series	Reprint of her out-of-print science fiction thriller from the early 1990s that was originally published under the pen name "eluki bes shahar" (lower case intentional). This title was re-released by Untreed Reads Publishing in December 2023 (ISBN 979-8888601044).
Refinery	February 2022	Paul Gruhn	978-1956015591	stand-alone	A technological mystery novel about how a series of unexplained small problems that are happening to an aging refinery that is leading to a catastrophic disaster. Coincidence? Or something more sinister? No magic, monsters, space aliens, or time warps involved in this one. This title was re-released by Untreed Reads Publishing in February 2023 (ISBN 979-8888600818).
Fool's Paradise	February 2022	Ray Tabler	978-1956015614	stand-alone	Another space opera. This title was re-released by Novus Mundi Publishing in July 2023 (ISBN 978-1961511057).
WarSpell: Support Missions (Game of Freedom Book 2)	March 2022	Gorg Huff and Paula Goodlett	978-1956015645	WarSpell (Game of Freedom)	Seventh book in the WarSpell series and the second in the "Game of Freedom" sub-series. This title was privately re-released by the authors via Amazon in November 2022 (ISBN 979-8363058370).
Whalesong	March 2022	Stoney Compton	978-1956015683	stand-alone	Fantasy story about a humpback whale and a young Eskimo who developed a mysterious psychic bond to each other. An early version of this story received a favorable mention in a 1990 review of the anthology Universe 1 by The New York Times. This title was re-released by Nazca Press in October 2024 (ISBN 978-1963479584).
Darktraders	April 2022	Rosemary Edghill	978-1956015706	Hellflower series	Reprint of Edghill's long out-of-print second book in the Hellflower series from the early 1990s. This title was re-released by Untreed Reads Publishing in January 2024 (ISBN 979-8888602195).
Time Enough 1777	April 2022	John Deakins	978-1956015720	stand-alone	Novel about a time-traveler from the 21st century who get shot by his own ancestor when visiting his family's ancestral Vermont home during the War of Independence.
WarSpell: World Sailing (Game of Freedom Book 3)	April 2022	Gorg Huff and Paula Goodlett	978-1956015744	WarSpell (Game of Freedom)	Eighth book in the WarSpell series and the third in the "Game of Freedom" sub-series. This title was privately re-released by the authors via Amazon in December 2022 (ISBN 979-8368385792).
Paradise	May 2022	Marella Sands	978-1956015775	Perdition	Fourth book in the Perdition series. This title was re-released by Untreed Reads Publishing in November 2023 (ISBN 979-8888601396).
The Hadley Directive	May 2022	J. Dharma Windham	978-1956015799	stand-alone	One of infinite parallel universes This title was re-released by Untreed Reads Publishing in January 2024 (ISBN 979-8888602102).
Subway to the Universe	May 2022	Nathan B. Dodge	978-1956015812	Subway Trilogy	The humans are winning against giant alien space bugs and owners of SSS found away to extend their portal system to include interstellar travel. Third and last book of Dodge's Subway Trilogy. This title was re-released by New Worlds Publishing in October 2023 (ISBN 978-1961511439).
Russian Amerika	June 2022	Stoney Compton	978-1956015836	Russian Amerika series	Reprint of first book in the Russian Amerika series, an alternative history in which the Russian Empire never sold Alaska. This title was re-released by Nazca Press in July 2024 (ISBN 978-1963479379).
WarSpell: The Princess' Choice (Game of Freedom Book 4)	June 2022	Gorg Huff and Paula Goodlett	978-1956015874	WarSpell (Game of Freedom)	Ninth book in the WarSpell series and the fourth in the "Game of Freedom" sub-series. This title was privately re-released by the authors via Amazon in December 2022 (ISBN 979-8370873188).
Promised Land	July 2022	Marella Sands	979-8887450032	Perdition	Fifth book in the Perdition series. This title was re-released by Untreed Reads Publishing in November 2023 (ISBN 979-8888601433).
Archangel Blues	July 2022	Rosemary Edghill	979-8887450049	Hellflower series	Reprint of Edghill's long out-of-print third book in the Hellflower series from the early 1990s. This title was re-released by Untreed Reads Publishing in December 2023 (ISBN 979-8888602126).
The Hunt at Bevel Springs	August 2022	Wayland Smith	979-8887450063	stand-alone	Weirdness in the post-Civil War Great Plains
Scepter of the Sun King	August 2022	Steve Ruskin	979-8887450087	Trina Piper Thrillers	Second book in the Trina Piper Thrillers series. Another mystery involving competing powers searching for the secrets hidden inside Louis XIV's missing septer. This title was privately re-released by the author via Amazon in June 2023 (ISBN 979-8399276588).
