= Capricon =

US science fiction convention

- Status: Active
- Genre: Science Fiction
- Location: Chicago area
- Country: United States
- Inaugurated: 1981
- Organizer: Phandemonium, Inc
- Filing status: Not For Profit
- Website: http://www.capricon.org/

Capricon is a science fiction convention held annually in the Chicago area. It is sponsored by Phandemonium and has been held each year since 1981.

This article provides a listing of all Capricons, detailing their dates, locations, chairpersons, guests and (starting in 1999) the themes of each convention.

Except where indicated otherwise, all information is taken from the "History of Capricon" page at Capricon's web site.

Event	Date	Location	Chair	Theme	Guests
Capricon 1	February 20–22, 1981	Holiday Inn, Evanston, Illinois	Chip Bestler		Author Guest of Honor: Terry Carr/Wilson Tucker; Fen Guests of Honor: J.R. & Mary Jane Holmes
Capricon 2	February 1982	Radisson Hotel, Chicago, Illinois	Leah Bestler		Author Guest of Honor: Gene Wolfe; Fan Guest of Honor: Mike Stein
Capricon 3	February 1983	Radisson Hotel, Chicago, Illinois	Virginia Meisinger		Author Guest of Honor: Stephen R. Donaldson; Fan Guest of Honor: Otlie & Phil Foglio
Capricon 4	February 1984	Continental Hotel, Chicago, Illinois	Marty Coady Fabish		Author Guest of Honor: Paul O. Williams; Fan Guest of Honor: Jeff Duntemann
Capricon 5	February 1985	Lincolnwood (Purple) Hyatt, Lincolnwood, Illinois	Ginny Meisinger		Author Guest of Honor: Frederik Pohl; Artist Guest of Honor: Darlene P. Coltrain
Capricon 6	February 28 - March 2, 1986	Lincolnwood (Purple) Hyatt, Lincolnwood, Illinois	Ginny Meisinger		Author Guest of Honor: David R. Palmer; Fan Guest of Honor: Tim Allen
Capricon 7	February 1987	Lincolnwood (Purple) Hyatt, Lincolnwood, Illinois	No chair		Author Guest of Honor: Jerry Oltion; Artist Guest of Honor: Stephen Hickman; Fan Guest of Honor: Joan Hanke-Woods
Capricon 8	February 1988	Arlington Park Hilton, Arlington Heights, Illinois	Alice Bentley		Author Guest of Honor: Lawrence Watt-Evans; Artist Guest of Honor: Kay Reynolds; Fan Guest of Honor: Kathleen Meyer
Capricon 9	February 1989	Lincolnwood (Purple) Hyatt, Lincolnwood, Illinois	Alice Bentley		Author Guest of Honor: Howard Waldrop; Fan Guest of Honor: Ken Fletcher
Capricon 10	February 1990	Lincolnwood (Purple) Hyatt, Lincolnwood, Illinois	Amy Schaefer		Author Guest of Honor: P.C. Hodgell; Artist Guest of Honor: Todd Cameron Hamilton; Fan Guest of Honor: Bill Higgins
Capricon 11	February 21–24, 1991	Lincolnwood (Purple) Hyatt, Lincolnwood, Illinois	Alice Bentley		Author Guest of Honor: Ellen Kushner; Editor Guest of Honor: Beth Meacham; Fan Guest of Honor: Becky Thomson
Capricon 12	February 20–23, 1992	Lincolnshire Resort, Lincolnshire, Illinois	Amy Schaefer		Author Guest of Honor: Terry Bisson; Special Guests of Honor: Kim Stanley Robinson & Paul Park; Fan Guest of Honor: Steve Scherer
Capricon 13	February 18–21, 1993	Pheasant Run, St. Charles, Illinois	Amy Schaefer		Author Guest of Honor: Terry Pratchett; Artist Guest of Honor: Darlene P. Coltrain; Fan Guest of Honor: George Laskowski
Capricon 14	February 1994	Wyndham Hamilton, Itasca, Illinois	Karen Babich		Author Guest of Honor: Connie Willis; Artist Guest of Honor: Mary Lynn Skirvin; Fan Guest of Honor: David Dyer-Bennet
Capricon 15	February 16–19, 1995	Wyndham Hamilton, Itasca, Illinois	Kathy Nerat		Author Guest of Honor: Nancy Kress; Fan Guest of Honor: Sue Blom
Capricon 16	February 8–11, 1996	Wyndham Hamilton, Itasca, Illinois	Doug Winkler		Author Guest of Honor: Sean Stewart; Artist Guest of Honor: Scott Gustafson; Media Guest of Honor: Michael Stein
Capricon 17	February 20–23, 1997	Oak Brook Hilton, Oak Brook, Illinois	Doug Winkler		Author Guest of Honor: Robert J. Sawyer
Capricon 18	February 5–8, 1998	Holiday Inn O'Hare, Rosemont, Illinois	Dina Krause		Author Guest of Honor: Josepha Sherman; Editor Guest of Honor: Steve Hockensmith
Capricon 19	February 11–14, 1999	Arlington Park Hilton, Arlington Heights, Illinois	Dave McCarty and Tracy Lunquist	Villains	Pro Guest of Honor: David Weber; Artist Guest of Honor: Todd Cameron Hamilton; Fan Guest of Honor: Phoenix
Capricon 20	January 27–30, 2000	Arlington Park Hilton, Arlington Heights, Illinois	Dave McCarty	Armageddon	Pro Guest of Honor: Larry Niven; Science Guest of Honor: Chris Luchini; Fan Guest of Honor: Joseph "Uncle Vlad" Stockman
Capricon 21	February 8–11, 2001	Arlington Park Hilton, Arlington Heights, Illinois	Tracy Lunquist	Tellurian Exposition	Pro Guest of Honor: Allen Steele; Fan Guest of Honor: Geri Sullivan
Capricon 22	February 7–10, 2002	Sheraton Chicago Northwest, Arlington Heights, Illinois	Deb Kosiba	Fun & Games	Fun Guest of Honor: Dr. Demento; Game Guest of Honor: James Ernest; Artist Guest of Honor: Kaja Foglio; Fan Guest of Honor: David Abzug
Capricon 23	February 6–9, 2003	Sheraton Chicago Northwest, Arlington Heights, Illinois	Cary Williams & Marnie Gucciard	Gods & Monsters	Author Guest of Honor: Tim Powers; Artist Guest of Honor: Amy K. Brown; Fan Guest of Honor: Bill Roper
Capricon 24	January 29-February 1, 2004	Sheraton Chicago Northwest, Arlington Heights, Illinois	Dave McCarty	Sensawondah	Author Guests of Honor: Spider and Jeanne Robinson; Artist Guest of Honor: Kimberly Reck; NASA Guest of Honor: Bryan Palaszewski
Capricon 25	February 10–14, 2005	Sheraton Chicago Northwest, Arlington Heights, Illinois	Deb Kosiba	Mad Scientists	Author Guest of Honor: James P. Hogan; Artist Guest of Honor: Shaenon K. Garrity; Fan Guest of Honor: John Morse
Capricon 26	February 9–13, 2006	Sheraton Chicago Northwest, Arlington Heights, Illinois	Greg (Guido) Williams	University of Fandom (UFAN)	Visiting Guest Faculty: Peter S. Beagle, Bryan Palaszewski from NASA, Kat Eggleston, Michael Longcor, Dr. Mary Crowell, Nick Pollotta, Jody Lynn Nye, Bill Fawcett, and Phyllis Eisenstein
Capricon 27	February 8–11, 2007	Sheraton Chicago Northwest, Arlington Heights, Illinois	Gretchen Roper	A Celebration of High Fantasy	Author Guest of Honor: Lois McMaster Bujold; Artist Guest of Honor: Erin McKee; Fan Guest of Honor: Cat Faber; Other special guests: Peter S. Beagle and Bryan Palaszewski from NASA
Capricon 28	February 14–17, 2008	Sheraton Chicago Northwest, Arlington Heights, Illinois	Leane Verhulst	Pirates	SF Author Guest of Honor: Mike Resnick; Pirate Guests of Honor: John Baur ("Ol' Chumbucket") and Mark Summers ("Cap'n Slappy"), creators of International Talk Like a Pirate Day; Artist Guest of Honor: Don Maitz; Other special guests: Michael Longcor, Janny Wurts, Tori Baur ("Mad Sally"), Tom Smith, Bill and Brenda Sutton, and Bryan Palaszewski from NASA
Capricon 29	February 19–22, 2009	Westin Chicago North Shore, Wheeling, Illinois	Helen Montgomery	Camp Among the Stars	Author: Sharon Shinn; Artist: Gary Lippincott; Fan: Christian McGuire; Filk: Barry and Sally Childs-Helton; NASA: Bryan Palaszewski
Capricon 30	February 11–14, 2010	Westin Chicago North Shore, Wheeling, Illinois	Helen Montgomery	Celebration!	Authors: Frederik Pohl, Spider and Jeanne Robinson, and Robert J. Sawyer; Artist: Lucy Synk; Fan: Alice Bentley
Capricon 31	February 10–13, 2011	Westin Chicago North Shore, Wheeling, Illinois	Erik Olson	Escape	Author: John Scalzi; Artist: John Picacio; Fans: Stephen Boucher and Janice Gelb
Capricon 32	February 9–12, 2012	Westin Chicago North Shore, Wheeling, Illinois	Sandra de Jong	Amazing Adventures	Author: Cory Doctorow; Media: Javier Grillo-Marxuach; Artist: Les McClaine; Fan: Steven H Silver
Capricon 33	February 7–10, 2013	Westin Chicago North Shore, Wheeling, Illinois	Mike Cyganiewicz	Artificial Intelligence	Author: Daniel H. Wilson; Artist: Karen Ann Hollingsworth; Fan: Helen Montgomery
Capricon 34	February 6–9, 2014	Westin Chicago North Shore, Wheeling, Illinois	Laura Dombrowski	the 4th Dimension	Author: S. M. Stirling; Artist: Tom Peters; Fan: Tadao Tomomatsu; Special: Jan Stirling and Sherrilyn Kenyon; Musical: Silent Nightmare
Capricon 35	February 12–15, 2015	Westin Chicago North Shore, Wheeling, Illinois	John (Shadowcat) Ickes	R & R	Author: Matt Forbeck; Filk: Alexander James Adams; Game: Margaret Weis; Artist: John Bivens; Podcaster: John Anealio; Podcaster: Patrick Hester Fan: Elizabeth "Dr. Evil" Huffman
Capricon 36	February 11–14, 2016	Westin Chicago North Shore, Wheeling, Illinois	Marinda Darnell	Once Upon a Capricon...	Author: Scott Lynch; Artist: Eric Wilkerson; Fan: Wendy Zdrodowski; Dance: Mae the Bellydancer; Puppet: Stacey Gordon; Special: Mark Oshiro
Capricon 37	February 16–19, 2017	Westin Chicago North Shore, Wheeling, Illinois	Peter Heltzer	And the Children Shall Lead	Author: Beth Revis; Artist: Nilah Macgruder; Fan: Meg Frank; Music: Tim Griffin
Capricon 38	February 15–18, 2018	Westin Chicago North Shore, Wheeling, Illinois	Terrence Miltner	Expanding Universes	Author: Timothy Zahn; Artist: Sarah Wilkinson; Fan: Dave McCarty; Gaming: Monica Valentinelli; Special: Matt McElroy
Capricon 39	February 14–17, 2019	Westin Chicago North Shore, Wheeling, Illinois	D'Andre Williams	Strange Beasts Arise	Author: Seanan McGuire; Artist: Phil Foglio; Fan: Doug Rice; Music: Carrie Dahlby
Capricon 40	February 13–16, 2020	Westin Chicago North Shore, Wheeling, Illinois	Aimee Dundon	The Tropics of Capricon	Author: Tobias Buckell; Artist: Trungles; Fan: Lillian Sams
Capricon 41	February 4–7, 2021	Virtual	Tammy Coxen	Creating the Future we Want	Aliette de Bodard; Brandon O’Brien; John Jennings; Michi Trota; Dr. Cacophonie Tamayo
Capricon 42	February 3–6, 2022	Sheraton Grand Chicago, Chicago, Illinois	Tori Carnall-Hawkins	Rockin’ In The Outer Realms	Author: Catherynne M. Valente; Artist: Gene Ha; Gaming: Tanya DePass
Capricon 43	February 2–5, 2023	Sheraton Grand Chicago, Chicago, IL	Doug Killings	AEteriny Awaits	Author: Steven Brust; Artist: Christine Mitzuk; Fan: Moshe Yudkowsky
Capricon 44	February 1–4, 2024	Sheraton Grand Chicago, Chicago, IL	Sam Haney Press	The Endurance of Stars	Author: K. Tempest Bradford; Artist: Ariela Housman; Literary: Catherine Lundoff; Fan: Victor Jason Raymond, founder of the Carl Brandon Society
Capricon 45	February 6-9, 2025	Sheraton Grand Chicago, Chicago, IL		Let Your Geek Flag Fly!	
Capricon 46	February 5–8, 2026	Mariott Chicago O'Hare, Chicago, IL	Kevin Hilty	Rise of the Humans	Andrea Hairston; Alexander Mui; Edward Ongweso; Jathan Sadowski; Laser Webber
