= Firstborn (Clarke and Baxter novel) =

2007 novel by Arthur C. Clarke and Stephen Baxter

- First edition (US)
- Author: Arthur C. Clarke; Stephen Baxter
- Cover artist: David Stevenson
- Language: English
- Series: A Time Odyssey
- Genre: Science fiction
- Publisher: UK: Gollancz; US: Del Rey
- Publication date: 26 December 2007
- Publication place: United Kingdom
- Media type: Print (hardcover)
- Pages: 359
- ISBN: 978-0-345-49157-2
- OCLC: 154309385
- Dewey Decimal: 823/.914 22
- LC Class: PR6005.L36 F57 2008
- Preceded by: Sunstorm

Firstborn is a 2007 science fiction novel by British writers Arthur C. Clarke and Stephen Baxter. It is the third book, billed as its conclusion, of the A Time Odyssey series.

== Setting ==
The series contains hints about the Firstborn, who, in the early days of the universe, developed as the first intelligent beings. The Firstborn have calculated that to survive until the Big Rip, the Universe has sufficient energy to support only a limited number of civilizations. They take it upon themselves to ensure that the number of civilizations does not exceed this limit, and humanity is now in their sights.

== Plot summary ==
The novel's action switches stage frequently between the Earth of 2069, the 'jigsaw-planet' Mir 31 years after its creation, and various settlements on Mars.

Firstborn opens with Bisesa Dutt waking up after 19 years of suspended animation, only to be informed of the fact that a 'bogey' has entered the Solar System. Further investigation of the object reveals that it is a "cosmological-weapon" (called a Q-bomb by scientists) capable of destroying matter by engulfing it into a small 'pocket universe', which is then quickly destroyed in a Big Rip-like event. Bisesa, her now-divorced daughter Myra, and a young spacer called Alexei Carel quickly leave the Earth via a space elevator, to escape what Alexei views as an inefficient and corrupt government. Meanwhile, on Mir, a young astronomer named Abdikadir (son of one of the main characters of Time's Eye), while making observations on what appears to be planet Mars covered in oceans, is interrupted by Bisesa Dutt's old mobile phone ringing.

Back on Earth, the Space Council is preparing to launch an antimatter-fueled spacecraft to intercept the Q-bomb, while Bisesa arrives at a research station located at Mars' North Pole. The team there had discovered a gravitational "trap" that contained one of the Firstborn's Eyes. This is proof that not only did intelligent Martians exist in the distant past, but that they had been exterminated (probably with another Q-bomb) by the Firstborn, but not before they had captured one of the Eyes. As she approaches the Eye, Bisesa is promptly sucked into a gateway and finds herself back on Mir, in the Temple of Marduk.

Babylon has been completely changed by Alexander the Great after his victory over the Mongols, becoming the center of his new empire and one of only two large cities on the planet (the other being a nineteenth-century Chicago). After a failed assassination attempt on Alexander, Bisesa is forced to leave Babylon and head for Chicago. On the way, her phone's AI determines that the universe containing Mir and the habitable version of Mars is rapidly decaying, and has only another 500 years left before it ends in a Big Rip.

Myra, after losing her mother once again on Mars, is contacted by the AI Athena, who had been the managing intelligence behind the storm shield in Sunstorm. After being copied and transmitted to nearby star systems in 2042, in an attempt to save a small bit of humankind should the shield project fail, she and another two AIs had reached a distant, inhabited planet, which had itself been almost sterilised by the Firstborn. From there, with the help of the planet's last inhabitant, they witnessed humanity's survival through the Sunstorm. Athena was promptly re-transmitted to Earth, to aid against the alien menace. Athena informs Myra and the Mars researchers of a plan to stop the Q-bomb by communicating to the Martians from Mir's universe.

Back on Mir, Bisesa reaches a frozen-over Chicago, the climate having been heavily disrupted by the Discontinuity (the moment of Mir's creation). There she receives a transmission from Myra in the "real" universe, informing her of Athena's plan to communicate with the Martians; a pattern of geometrical shapes was to be transmitted to Blue Mars, which would prompt the Martian survivors to somehow act. At the suggestion of Thomas Alva Edison, the residents of Chicago dig vast trenches in the shapes required in Mir's North American icecap, filling them with oil and setting them ablaze; the pattern is observed by the sole remaining inhabitant of Blue Mars, at the Martian North Pole, who promptly reconfigures its version of the gravity trap to crush the Eye it contained.

Athena's hypotheses was that all the Eyes were connected, and the destruction of one on Blue Mars would attract the Q-bomb to real-Mars, thereby destroying the planet completely but sparing Earth. The scheme is successful, and the Q-bomb is diverted. It strikes Mars, and the planet slowly begins to leave the universe. Myra decides to stay at the Martian North Pole as the planet dissolves. On Mir, Bisesa travels back to Babylon, activating the Eye and returning to real-Mars at the very moment of the Big-Rip.

The novel ends with Myra and Bisesa reunited on the planet shown to Bisesa during her very first trip through an Eye. A portal opens behind them, and Myra's estranged daughter, Charlotte, invites them through. It is revealed that in Charlotte's future, humanity alone or with other sentient allies, perhaps a faction of the Firstborn, calls itself the Lastborn as they are at war with the Firstborn.

== Reception ==
Kirkus Reviews said "readable, but more science travelogue than science fiction—and if you were anticipating a conclusion, or at least an alien encounter, forget it." Publishers Weekly wrote "the narrative leaps about too much to develop characters, but Clarke has never been as interested in individuals as in humanity's ability to accept change as a species. It's too early to tell whether that theme will be enough to carry the story to a coherent conclusion."
