= Heart of Gold (novel) =

2000 novel by Sharon Shinn

- First edition cover
- Author: Sharon Shinn
- Cover artist: James Griffin
- Language: English
- Genre: Science fiction
- Published: 2000 Ace Books
- Publication place: United States
- Media type: Print (Paperback)
- Pages: 341
- ISBN: 0-441-00821-6
- OCLC: 46764111
- LC Class: CPB Box no. 1835 vol. 6

Heart of Gold is a science fiction novel by American writer Sharon Shinn, published in 2000. The story occurs on an unnamed world in an unnamed city where three races (indigo, gulden, and albino) live together. The books focuses on conflicts between the aristocratic, pastoral, and matriarchal Indigo and the clannish, technological, and patriarchal gulden, with little said about the third albino race.

The story follows Nolan Adelpho, an initially conventional indigo biochemist, and Kitrini Candachi, an indigo aristocrat raised among the gulden whose lover is an imprisoned gulden terrorist, as their lives are changed through their understanding of increasingly violent racial conflict around them.

== Reception ==
Jackie Cassada in her review for Library Journal said that this novel "explores the complex struggles of decent people caught in a web of deceit and treachery as they discover the common ground that underlies superficial differences." Publishers Weekly was critical in their review saying that "this flimsy attempt at crossing romance with SF in an imaginary society that reverses customary gender roles results in a hybrid as sterile and ungainly as a mule."
