= Jovah's Angel =

1997 novel by Sharon Shinn

- First edition
- Author: Sharon Shinn
- Cover artist: John Jude Palencar
- Language: English
- Series: Samaria series
- Genre: Science fantasy
- Publisher: Ace Books
- Publication date: 1997
- Publication place: United States
- Media type: Print (Paperback)
- Preceded by: Archangel
- Followed by: The Alleluia Files

Jovah's Angel is a 1997 science fantasy novel by American writer Sharon Shinn. It is the second book in the Samaria series of novels.

== Plot summary ==
Some 150 years have passed since the events of Archangel and weather patterns have become increasingly unstable. The current Archangel, Delilah, is injured while flying in a storm and her angelico killed. Jovah decrees that she can no longer be Archangel as she is unable to fly, and names Alleluia Archangel in her place. While many protest her elevation, others believe she has been chosen because Jovah never fails to hear her voice.

Alleluia does not feel up to the task of managing the other political powers of Sammorah, but somewhat manages with the aid of the angel Samuel. As pressure continues to mount on her, the old music machines located in Eyrie begin to fail until only one is left. Seeking any diversion, Alleluia goes off in search of the inventor/engineer Caleb, whom an Edori in Velora believes may be able to fix it. She finds him in Luminaux where she discovers the former Archangel performing in a club under the name "Lilah."

Delilah wants nothing to do with Alleluia, but Caleb agrees to visit Velora as soon as possible. Caleb is revealed to be friends with Delilah and another inventor/engineer Noah. The two inventor/engineers theorize that Delilah is seeking thrills to entertain her, so when they mention that they will be travelling to Bereven as part of their work, she decides to accompany them. They travel via Noah's "Beast," a primitive steam-powered car. When Delilah learns of the reason they have travelled there to aid the design of self-propelled ships, she wishes to join the Edori expedition to Ysral. Noah, who is falling in love with her, declares that she cannot go and that he will go in her stead.

Alleluia as Archangel, must also find her angelico. Jovah only refers to him as "The son of Jeremiah" and much of her time is devoted to searching for him, and consulting the oracles. The oracle of Mount Sinai has recently died leaving no third oracle, and in her attempts to better understand Jovah, Alleluia takes several books and begins learning the old language used at the interfaces. She learns through the interface that Jovah is in need of help, and that is also the son of Jeremiah who could help Jovah.

As these events take place, the weather is beginning to threaten their very way of life, and Alleluia finds references in the old texts and Edori songs that the weather is returning to how it originally was when the first colonists arrive. In a particularly harsh storm, Alleluia is also cast to the ground and uses that event to great effect to appease the other political powers. She manages to convince them that it is not the Angels causing the storms in purpose, but that they may all be in genuine danger.

Alleluia begins the theorize that similar to the music machines some sort of device that aids Jovah to hear the angels may begin failing and once again locates Caleb. They meet up at Hagar's Tooth to look for such a device, and amid their budding romance find it and determine that it is working correctly. Alleluia departs as rapidly as she can citing that she can not fall in love because she must marry her angelico as decreed by Jovah.

Caleb chases after her and after a circuitous route meets her at Mount Sinai where she hopes to commune directly with Jovah. Alleluia logs in and teleports up to Jehovah, the spaceship above the planet, just in time for Caleb to see her vanish. He reasons out what she must have done and follows her. On the spaceship she goes through a crisis when it is revealed that Jovah is the AI controlling the ship. Some relief is provided by Caleb being revealed as the son of Jeremiah. Caleb also manages to repair the Jehovah so that all angels' voices will be heard again.

As they leave the Jehovah, Caleb takes several batteries with him. He returns to Luminaux just before Delilah is to depart for the journey to Ysral, and convinces her to try one last time to repair her wing. The battery is inserted and somehow jumpstarts damaged nerves so that while there is no feeling, Delilah can now control her wing. She decides not to go and Noah remains as well. A short time later Delilah triumphantly returns to Eyrie to resume her role as Archangel with Noah as her Angelico.

After much soul searching, and a quick Q&A session with Jovah, Alleluia also returnes to Eyrie shortly after Delilah. She confirms that Delilah will be continue as Archangel and that she will become the new oracle at Mount Sinai. Caleb returns with her and founds an engineering college at the base of the mountain.

=== Samaria Series ===
- Archangel (Ace Books, 1997)
- Jovah's Angel (Ace Books, 1998)
- The Alleluia Files (Ace Books, 1999)
- Angelica (Ace Books, 2003) Although this is the fourth novel in the Samaria series, it is set before the first book Archangel.
- Angel-Seeker (Ace Books, 2004)
