= Sharon Shinn =

American science fiction writer

- Shinn at World Fantasy Convention 2026
- Born: 1957 (age 68–69); Wichita, Kansas, U.S.
- Education: Northwestern University
- Occupations: Novelist, journalist
- Writing career
- Genres: Science fiction, fantasy
- Website: sharonshinn.info

Sharon Shinn (born 1957) is an American novelist who writes combining aspects of fantasy, science fiction and romance. She has published more than a dozen novels for adult and young adult readers. Her works include the Shifting Circles Series, the Samaria Series, the Twelve Houses Series, and a rewriting of Jane Eyre, Jenna Starborn. She works as a journalist in St. Louis, Missouri and is a graduate of Northwestern University.

Shinn is a St. Louis Cardinals and St. Louis Rams fan and is also a big fan of the TV Show Lost. She is a frequent attender of science-fiction/fantasy conventions. Her first guest of honor stint at a convention was ArmadilloCon 26. She was also the guest of honor at the convention Capricon 29.

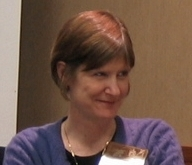
Shinn at Capricon 29 in 2009

In 2009, she donated her archive to the department of Rare Books and Special Collections at Northern Illinois University.

In Laurell K Hamilton's novel Obsidian Butterfly of her Anita Blake: Vampire Hunter series, Anita Blake mentions that she reads Sharon Shinn's novels to help her deal with her phobia of flying.

== Awards ==
- William L. Crawford Award (awarded by the International Association for the Fantastic in the Arts for best first fantasy novel) (1996)
- Twice nominated for the John W. Campbell Award for Best New Writer (1995, 1996)
- Summers at Castle Auburn named to the ALA list of Best Books (2002).

== Works ==
=== Safe-Keeper series ===
1. The Safe-Keeper's Secret (Puffin Books, 2004)
2. The Truth-Teller's Tale (Puffin Books, 2005)
3. The Dream-Maker's Magic (Viking Press, 2006)

=== Samaria series ===
1. Archangel (Ace Books, 1996)
2. Jovah's Angel (Ace Books, 1997)
3. The Alleluia Files (Ace Books, 1997)
4. Angelica (Ace Books, 2003) Although this is the fourth novel in the Samaria series, it is set before the first book Archangel.
5. Angel-Seeker (Ace Books, 2004) This novel is set immediately after the first book Archangel.

=== Twelve Houses series ===
- "Flame" (Ace Books, 2009) in Quatrain
1. Mystic and Rider (Ace Books, 2005)
2. The Thirteenth House (Ace Books, 2006)
- "When Winter Comes" (Berkley Books, 2006) in The Queen of Winter
- Shifter and Shadow (Fairwood Press, 2025; novella)
3. Dark Moon Defender (Ace Books, 2006)
4. Reader and Raelynx (Ace Books, 2007)
5. Fortune and Fate (Ace Books, 2008)

=== Elemental Blessings series ===
1. Troubled Waters (Ace Books, 2010)
2. Royal Airs (Ace Books, 2013)
3. Jeweled Fire (Ace Books, 2015)
4. Unquiet Land (Ace Books, 2016)
5. Whispering Wood (Fairwood Press, 2024)

=== Shifting Circle series ===
1. The Shape of Desire (Ace Books, 2012)
2. Still Life With Shape Shifter (Ace Books, 2012)
3. The Turning Season (Ace Books, 2014)

=== Uncommon Echoes series ===
1. Echo in Onyx (audiobook, Audible, March 2019; trade paperback and ebook, Ethan Ellenberg Literary Agency, August 2019)
2. Echo in Emerald (audiobook, Audible, March 2019; trade paperback and ebook, Ethan Ellenberg Literary Agency, 2019)
3. Echo in Amethyst (audiobook, Audible, March 2019; trade paperback and ebook, Ethan Ellenberg Literary Agency, 2019)

=== Other novels ===
- The Shape-Changer's Wife (Ace Books, 1995)
- Heart of Gold (Ace Books, 2000)
- Wrapt in Crystal (Ace Books, 2000)
- Summers at Castle Auburn (Ace Books, 2002)
- Jenna Starborn (Ace Books, 2003)
- General Winston's Daughter (Viking Press, 2007)
- Gateway (Viking Press, 2009)
- Shattered Warrior (First Second Books, 2017), a graphic novel illustrated by Lee Knox Ostertag
- The Shuddering City (Fairwood Press, 2022)
- Alibi (Fairwood Press, 2024)

=== Anthologies and collections ===
Anthology and Collection	Contents	Publication Date	Publisher	Comments
To Weave a Web of Magic	"Fallen Angel"	2004	Berkley Books	novella; This story is set in Samaria.
The Queen in Winter	"When Winter Comes"	2006	Berkley Books	novella; is set in The Twelve Houses Series between Mystic and Rider and Dark Moon Defender
Powers of Detection: Stories of Mystery & Fantasy	"The Sorcerer's Assassin"	2006	Ace Books	edited by Dana Stabenow
Firebirds Rising	"Wintermoon Wish"	2006	Firebird Books	is set in the Safe-Keeper world
Elemental: The Tsunami Relief Anthology	"The Double-Edged Sword"	2006	Tor Books	
Elemental Magic	"Bargain With the Wind"	2007	Berkley Books	
Unusual Suspects	"The House of Seven Spirits"	2008	Ace Books	
Quatrain	"Flight" "Blood" "Gold" "Flame"	2009	Ace Books	"Flight" is set in Samaria "Blood" is set in the world of Heart of Gold "Gold" is set after Summers at Castle Auburn "Flame" is a prequel to The Twelve Houses Series
Never After	"The Wrong Bridegroom"	2009	Berkley Books	
Angels of Darkness	"Nocturne"	2011	Berkley Books Penguin Group	is set in Samaria.
The Mammoth Book of Ghost Romance	"Can You Hear Me Now?"	2012	Running Press	
Fantastic Hope	"Not in This Lifetime"	2020	Berkley Books	
Shadows of the Past	"Chief Executed Officers" "The Unrhymed Couplets of the Universe"	2021	Ethan Ellenberg Literary Agency	"Unrhymed Couplets" first appeared in the January 2008 issue of the online magazine Orson Scott Card's Intergalactic Medicine Show
