= The Twelve Houses series =

Novel series by Sharon Shinn

- Mystic and Rider, The Thirteenth House, Dark Moon Defender, Reader and Raelynx, Fortune and Fate
- Author: Sharon Shinn
- Country: United States
- Language: English
- Genre: Fantasy
- Publisher: Ace
- Published: 2005 – present
- Media type: Print (hardcover and paperback)

The Twelve Houses series is a fantasy novel series by American writer Sharon Shinn. The books straddle the genres of sword and sorcery, as well as romance. They take place in the mythical kingdom of Gillengaria.

The land of Gillengaria is an island divided into twelve semi-independent fiefdoms each ruled by a great house. King Baryn has only one child, believed by many to be unfit to rule. The Twelve Great Houses are jockeying for position to be ready to contend for the throne when King Baryn dies. This jockeying is tearing the kingdom apart, and has brought it to the brink of civil war.

In addition the general population is angry at the king for defending the mystics which they fear and despise. The mystics are people born to magical powers, usually of a quite limited scope such as being able to change shape, or being able to start fires. Any family of any rank can produce a mystic. Usually if the family is prominent the child is cast out.

In addition to the Mystics, and the Twelve Great Houses, there is a third power group, the King's Riders. The King's Riders are a band of fifty bodyguards who are fanatically loyal to the king. They are depicted as being extraordinary fighters, skilled with all weapons.

It currently consists of these books.

- Mystic and Rider (Ace Books, 2005)
- The Thirteenth House (Ace Books, 2006)
- Dark Moon Defender (Ace Books, 2006)
- Reader and Raelynx (Ace Books, 2007)
- Fortune and Fate (Ace Books, 2008; new story arc)

The first four books complete a story arc. The fifth book starts a new story arc.

== Plots ==
=== Mystic and Rider ===
King Baryn sends Senneth on a mission to discover the mindset of the twelve marlords of Gillengaria about a potential revolution – and towards mystics. The king orders two of his best Riders to escort her - Tayse and Justin. Serramarra Kirra and her companion Donnal volunteer to accompany them. Along their journey they find Cammon and bring him with them.

The group discovers the southern marlords are more supportive of the idea of rebellion while the northern marlords stand with the king. Meanwhile, Senneth and Tayse fall in love. But first Senneth must convince Tayse he is not unworthy of her.

=== The Thirteenth House ===
The king requests Senneth accompany his daughter on her first tour of Gillengaria. Everyone from their previous group – Tayse, Justin, Kirra, Donnal, and Cammon – comes with them. Kirra, however, is disguised as her sister, Casserah.

=== Dark Moon Defender ===
Justin is sent to spy on Coralinda Gisseltess and her convent of Pale Mother worshippers. He meets and befriends Ellynor, a young Lirren girl sent to the convent to watch over her flighty cousin Rosurie. Justin later figures out that she is a mystic, and helps her escape from the convent.

Ellynor and Justin fall in love, but since Justin is outside the sebahta-ris, or clan network, of the Lirrens, their love would result in a fight to the death between Justin and a male relative of Ellynor's. Senneth discovers that the two can be married if Ellynor declares herself bahta-lo – free of the clan.

=== Reader and Raelynx ===
The king decides to attempt to divert the coming civil war by marrying his daughter off to one of the southern marlords. Cammon is assigned to read the intentions of Princess Amalie's suitors. Unfortunately, he and the princess soon fall in love themselves.

The civil war, led by Coralinda Gisseltess, who has been trying to stamp out mystics and their magical practices, her brother, the lord of Gisseltess, and the lord of Fortunalt, ends with the death of King Baryn, and the deaths of the three leaders of the rebellion. Some Riders die in defense of King Baryn. Some of those who don't die resign from the Riders, because they feel that they failed in their principal duty.

=== Fortune and Fate ===
This book starts a new story arc, with new characters.

This book introduces Wen, who is a former King's Rider. She failed to protect King Baryn during a rebellion for which she feels crushing shame. She is also suffering because of the marriage of Justin, a man she loved, to another.

Wen wanders over the country, looking for wrongs to right, but does not stay anywhere for very long. Eventually, she saves Karryn, the daughter of a rebel, from kidnapping and ravishment. Jasper Paladar, the uncle and guardian of Karryn, asks Wen to train a corps of bodyguards. She reluctantly agrees, and over time recovers from her heartbreak to fall in love with Jasper.

The action is divided between Wen's work to create a competent guard for Karryn, the heiress of Fortunalt, and a tour of the country by Cammon, the Queen's consort, with Tayse and other riders and guards, plus Senneth, Tayse's wife. Near the end of the book, when Cammon's tour has come to Fortunalt, and a plot to kill Karryn has been foiled, Tayse and Senneth come to believe that the main reason for making the tour was actually so Cammon and the Riders with him could help Wen come to terms with the fact that the King's death was not her fault, and to show her that she has much to offer and can find a permanent place of service and love.

== Characters ==
=== Senneth Brassenthwaite ===
Senneth is a powerful mystic who specializes in the use of fire. She draws her power from the Bright Mother, or sun goddess. She is a former serramarra of the House of Brassenthwaite, but was expelled by her father at the age of seventeen after he killed her newborn illegitimate son in a fit of rage. After leaving her home, she wandered Gillengaria and eventually crossed into the Lirrens. She was adopted by one of the sebahta and had to declare herself bahta-lo to prevent herself from being married off by her well-intentioned adopted family. She went to Danalustrous to act as tutor to Kirra and Donnal for a few years, and began to serve the king. She later went back to Brassenthwaite to reconcile with her brothers. She is married to Tayse.

=== Tayse ===
Tayse is a King's Rider, one of the elite 50 soldiers selected to work for the king himself. His father and grandfather were Riders before him, and he never doubted his desired career. He is very quiet and solemn most of the time, and is an excellent warrior. He fell in love with Senneth despite their differences in rank and privilege, and they eventually marry.

=== Kirra Danalustrous ===
Kirra is a stunningly beautiful serramarra who possesses the ability to shape-shift and heal. When she was young she learned about a young mystic like herself living in a village within Danalustrous and summoned him to live with her in Danan Hall. This mystic is Donnal, and from then on he becomes unwaveringly loyal to her. Kirra is very close to her father and younger sister, Casserah, but is constantly restless in contrast to their homebodyness. She tours Gillangaria disguised as Casserra and begins an affair with the regent Romar. She later leaves Romar and takes away his knowledge of their love for each other. After she leaves Romar forever, she realizes she loves Donnal.

=== Donnal ===
Donnal is Kirra's companion and protector. He loves her and is completely loyal to her. He also possesses the ability to shape shift.

=== Justin ===
Justin is the son of a prostitute who died when he was ten. He spent his youth learning to fight and steal, when one day he tried to rob Tayse. Instead of killing him, the older man took Justin back to the palace and trained him as a King's Rider. As a result, Justin is unswervingly loyal to Tayse and the king. He first meets Ellynor when she is molested on the streets by a low-ranking nobleman and he saves her. They begin to meet in secret and soon fall in love. He is attacked on the way home from visiting her and she saves his life with her healing powers.

=== Cammon ===
Cammon has the ability to sense the emotions and intentions of others. He is also able to enhance the powers of other mystics and can communicate with people over long distances. He also has the ability to heal people's emotional trauma. (This is discovered in Reader and Raelynx after King Baryn dies) He has lived outside Gillengaria with his parents who traveled between several countries. His family never lived in one place for long (The longest stay anywhere was only several months). He cites the fact that his parents did not pay much attention to him growing up and the constant moving to his loneliness. His father died when he was nineteen. After his father died, his mother arranged travel back to Gillengaria on a ship. To pay for the trip she arranged to work in the kitchens. She died on the trip back. As he had no money and his mother had died, the Ship's Captain indentured him to a tavernkeeper. The tavernkeeper recognized him as a mystic and being a follower of the Pale Mother he put a slave collar and moonstone on him. This restricted his powers and burned him. He stayed there until he was rescued by Senneth's group. Eventually, Princess Amalie and Cammon fall in love. Their friends invent a fictitious ancestry for Cammon, which allows them to marry.

=== Ellynor ===
Ellynor is a native Lirren girl who comes to the Lumanen Convent to watch over her flighty cousin, Rosurie. She discovers she is a mystic and flees with Justin. She decides to declare herself bahta-lo so she can marry Justin. She returns to Gillengaria and is instrumental in winning the war.

=== Princess Amalie ===
Princess Amalie is the daughter of King Baryn and his late wife. She shows an astonishing amount of calm and lack of fear. She is rather naïve, having lived in the palace her whole life. She is a mystic.

=== Minor characters ===
- King Baryn – The aging king of Gillengaria. He is a good king who wants what is best for his people. He hopes to prevent a war at all costs.
- Queen Valri – King Baryn's mysterious new wife. She has a great amount of concern for Amalie's safety. Later Ellynor reveals that she is originally from the Lirrens.
- Casserah Danalustrous – Kirra's younger half-sister. They are very close. Kirra disguises herself as Casserah so that she won’t have to leave Danalustrous to make the circuit of Gillengaria and meet all the marlords.
- Halchon Gisseltess – The evil marlord of Gisseltess, he wishes to overthrow the king and marry Senneth. He possesses some kind of ability to dampen the power of mystics.
- Coralinda Gisseltess – The sister of Halchon and founder of the Lumanen Convent. She hates mystics with a passion and orders the torture and murder of all mystics.
- Rosurie – Ellynor's cousin. She is sent to the Lumanen Convent to keep her away from her unsuitable lover. She becomes a fanatic, shaving her head and denouncing her own cousin as a mystic, though it means Ellynor will die.
- Wen - A King's Rider who survived an attack on King Baryn, but feels that his death was her fault, and that she doesn't deserve the friendship of the Riders, or of anyone else.

=== Goddesses ===
- The Pale Mother/Silver Lady – Goddess of the moon. She is vain but devoted to those who give her adoration. She is a source of power derived from other power; power channeled or reflected from other sources. The Moonstone is her symbol.
- The Bright Mother/Red Lady – Goddess of the sun. She gives the power of fire. Gold is her symbol.
- The Wild Mother/Green Lady? – Goddess of animals. She gives the power to shape-shift. Jade is possibly her symbol. The description of the stone carving Kirra possesses corresponds to tiger-eye, so this stone could possibly be her symbol as well.
- The Dark Watcher/Black Mother – Goddess of the night. She gives the power of concealment and the gift of healing. Black and Blue Opals are her symbols.
- Unknown goddess(possibly Green Keeper) – She gives the power of plant growth.
- Lady of the Waters/Blue Mother? - She gives the power of sensitivity, such as reading emotions and sometimes thoughts.
- Wind Maker?/Grey Mother? - She gives to power to physically influence objects.
- Numerous unknown goddesses.

=== Twelve Houses ===
- Danalustrous- Northwest corner. One of the most powerful houses who stands with mystics, though they would rather stay aloof. Known for being mediators in problems. The marlord is Malcolm, and he has two daughters, Casserah and Kirra, a mystic.
- Brassenthwaite- Northeast corner. One of the most powerful houses who supports the king out of loyalty, not love for mystics. Known for loyalty to the king, no matter what. The marlord is Kiernan, and Senneth is his sister, a mystic.
- Gisseltess- Southeast corner. One of the most powerful houses who is violently against the mystics. Known for having rulers who are the opposites of their parents. Halchon is marlord, and his sister, Coralinda, is the Lestra of the convent of the Pale Mother.
- Rappengrass- West of Fortunalt. A house that stands with mystics, but is surrounded by enemies. Ariane is marlady, and her favorite son is Darryn.
- Fortunalt- Southwest corner. A house against mystics. Rayson is marlord.
- Helven- North of Fortnalt and Rappengrass. A house trying to stay neutral. Martin is marlord.
- Kianlever- Southwest of Brassenwaite. A house with the king, but trying to stay neutral. Eliose is marlady.
- Coravann- South of Kianlever. A house trying to stay neutral. Heffel is its marlord and he married a Lirren, killing his bride's father and then making peace with her family, making good trade relations.
- Nocklyn- West of Gisseltess. A house against mystics, but the sick marlord still holds enough power to keep this house from open rebellion. Els is marlord, but his daughter's husband, a Gisseltess, is truly in control.
- Merrenstow- West of Brassenwaite. A house known for marrying the kings of Gillengaria. The regent, Romar Brendan is from Merrenstow.
- Tilt- East of Danalustrous. A house who will come out on top no matter who wins. Known for its treachery. Gregory Tilton is marlord.
- Storian- Northwest of Helven. Known for its support of Danalustrous in most things. Rafe is its marlord.

== Relevance of the title ==
The twelve houses referenced in the title are the twelve great noble houses of Gillengaria.
