= Time's Eye =

2003 novel by Arthur C. Clarke

- Author: Arthur C. Clarke and Stephen Baxter
- Cover artist: David Stevenson
- Language: English
- Series: A Time Odyssey
- Genre: Science fiction
- Publisher: UK: Voyager; US: Del Rey
- Publication date: 3 March 2003
- Publication place: Great Britain
- Media type: Print (hardback & paperback)
- Pages: 392
- ISBN: 0-00-713846-6
- Followed by: Sunstorm

Time's Eye is a 2003 science fiction novel co-written by British writers Arthur C. Clarke and Stephen Baxter. It is the first book in the A Time Odyssey series. The next book in the series is Sunstorm.

== Plot ==
The story begins with a series of individuals from different time periods encountering motionless, hovering spheres—and each other—in the region of the Northwest Frontier. Two early hominins, a mother and daughter, are the first. They lack a language, but are referred to in the narration as "Seeker" and "Grasper". Just after encountering a sphere, they are captured by strange creatures in red, later revealed to be British Redcoats.

In the year 2037, a UN peacekeeper helicopter is badly damaged by an R.P.G. It crashes near Jamrud Fort, which is defended by British soldiers and sepoys from 1885—including the same redcoats who captured Seeker and Grasper, which the British call "man-apes". Also present at the fort are the factor Cecil de Morgan, and two journalist observers, the American Josh White and the Anglo-Indian "Ruddy"—a young and as-yet unknown Rudyard Kipling.

The helicopter crew comprises an American pilot, Chief Warrant Officer Casey Othic; a British Indian observer, Lieutenant Bisesa Dutt; and Chief Warrant Officer Abdikadir Omar, an Afghan Pashtun with blue eyes and strawberry blond hair, which he claims is inherited from soldiers in the army of Alexander the Great. All three survive the helicopter crash, and they are taken prisoner by the British. Both sides soon realise that they are from different time periods, brought together by an event they name the "Discontinuity", and begin working together.

Abdikadir investigates one of the spheres, located near the fort, which the British call an "Eye". He determines that it possesses inexplicable properties; among other things, its circumference and volume are not related to its radius by a factor of pi, as in ordinary geometry, but by a factor of exactly 3. The 19th-century British, however, have become accustomed to the sphere, and use a camouflage net draped over it as a cage for the "man-apes".

Also beginning in 2037, a Soyuz capsule departs the International Space Station to return to Earth. Aboard are two Russians, Musa Ivanov and Kolya Krivalapov, and an American, Sable Jones. Sable is abrasive and ambitious, which Kolya believes has helped her succeed in her field, but she especially irritates Musa. The Soyuz loses contact with ground control, and takes up orbit rather than re-entering the atmosphere. They manage to establish radio contact with the "moderns" in Jamrud, and through the cosmonauts' observations, the characters learn that the Earth has become a patchwork conglomerate of terrain, and people, from different time periods spanning two million years ago up to the 21st century. Aside from Jamrud, and a site in North America that might be 19th-century Chicago, the cosmonauts' observations find no signs of industrial civilisation at all. They do, however, detect one other radio signal: a beacon of unknown origin located at the site of Babylon.

After weeks of orbiting, the cosmonauts decide to bring the Soyuz down in central Asia, where their observations have noted signs of extensive, but still pre-industrial, habitation. From there they hope to make their way to Jamrud. Before re-entry, Musa suggests that calling this patchwork world "Earth" is inappropriate, and proposes the name "Mir" instead; not for the "antique Russian space station", but for the Russian word мир, meaning both "peace" and "world".

The Soyuz lands successfully, but upon exiting the craft, Musa is decapitated by a Mongol warrior. Kolya, remembering a few words of Mongolian, manages to convince the Mongols that they are "emissaries of Heaven", and Sable and Kolya are loaded onto a cart heading east. They have arrived in the Mongol Empire of the 13th century, during the reign of Genghis Khan, to whom the "emissaries" are brought.

At the Khan's court, Kolya lays plans to use the Mongol army to enter China and rebuild the trading posts and towns that were lost in the Discontinuity. Sable disagrees, and instead proposes to take the army to Babylon. She hopes to find the unexplained radio beacon, believing it connected to whatever inconceivable event caused the Discontinuity, and thus the centre of power in "Mir". When Sable saves the Khan's life by shooting dead a sabre-toothed cat with her hidden side arm, Genghis accepts her as truly an emissary of Heaven, takes her to his bed, and agrees to her plan to take Babylon.

Meanwhile, the British have encountered the army of Alexander the Great, on the march down the Indus after the revolt that ended Alexander's eastward expansion. Alexander is suffering from his injury in the Mallian Campaign, but recovers, and the British and Macedonian forces form an alliance. Their goal, too, is Babylon; Alexander wishes to return to the capital of his Persian empire, and the "moderns" wish to locate the radio beacon. Alexander's army arrives at Babylon before the Khan, and has time to explore it. A sphere at least three times larger than those previously seen is discovered in the Temple of Marduk, and is found to be the source of the radio signals.

Meanwhile, the Khan's army reaches and sacks 19th-century Bishkek, massacring almost the entire population. Seeing this, Kolya plots against the Khan and Sable. As they near Babylon, he uses the radio equipment from the Soyuz to contact Casey and warn him of the coming Mongols. Sable catches Kolya in the act, but since the Mongols refuse to spill the "royal blood" of an emissary of Heaven, they blind and deafen him and throw him, alive, into a boarded-over pit.

An embassy from Alexander to the Mongols is rebuffed; Alexander's general Ptolemy is beheaded, and the survivors return mutilated. The defence of Babylon is organised, with the moderns introducing the Macedonians to guns and grenades. The combined Macedonian–British force meets the Mongols before the gates of the city. The defence is gradually worn down by the Mongols, and the shock of modern arms is blunted by Sable having prepared the Mongol troops, just as the British had the Macedonians.

However, Kolya is still alive. Knowing more of the Mongols than Sable did, he had already guessed what their punishment of him would be: to bury him alive, beneath the yurt of the Khan himself. Having hidden a water supply and an improvised bomb on his person, he chooses his moment and detonates the bomb, killing the Khan.

When the signal of the Khan's death reaches the field, most of the Mongols withdraw in order to hold a kurultai. However, a small force remains under Sable's command. They break through the weakened defenders and head straight for the Temple of Marduk and the massive sphere, dubbed the "Eye of Marduk". Bisesa confronts Sable in the Temple and incapacitates her, but Ruddy is fatally shot.

Alexander's lover Hephaestion died in the battle, but Alexander refuses the public mourning period. Sable is executed, as is Cecil de Morgan, who had sold secrets to the Mongols and told Sable where to find the Eye of Marduk. The Macedonians and British settle in Babylon and establish a home there.

Bisesa spends all of her time studying the Eye of Marduk, becoming convinced that ancient, intelligent beings are observing them through it, and that she has been able to not only sense their presence, but communicate with them. Neither her friends' concern, nor an expedition with Alexander around the Mediterranean, nor her romantic relationship with Josh, distract her for long. Meanwhile, the British have again used an Eye to support the cage holding Seeker and Grasper, but the Eye begins to compel the "man-apes" to act in unusual ways, as if performing experiments on them.

Bisesa believes that the beings behind the Eye have agreed to grant her request: to take her home, to Earth. The beings do indeed use the Eye to take her away from Mir, together with Josh, who insists on accompanying her. However, their first destination is a blasted wasteland, possibly the result of nuclear devastation, and Bisesa concludes that they are in the far future, perhaps millions of years from their own time. Another Eye appears and takes Bisesa—and only Bisesa—away again; before she vanishes, they grant her plea to send Josh back to Mir instead of leaving him alone in the waste.

As the story concludes, there is a chapter from the point of view of the ancient beings, the "Firstborn", explaining that they arose in the early days of the universe, on a planet orbiting a powerful but short-lived star. When their star died, they saw it as the beginning of the heat death of the universe. Wanting to stop anything that might hasten the end of the universe and thus the end of intelligent life, they set out to find other intelligent beings developing advanced technology, and to stop them before they can develop to the point of consuming "too much" energy.

On Mir, Seeker and Grasper have been released, but Grasper, changed by her time under the Eye, begins to imagine a future for her kind in this world, a future of successfully competing with the humans. Lastly, Bisesa arrives on Earth, in her home in London, the day after her helicopter flight. Her eight-year-old daughter Myra is there, and Bisesa promises to explain her sudden appearance and strange state, but then she sees an Eye floating over the city.

== See also ==
- Time Spike
