= Sunstorm (novel) =

2005 science fiction novel by Arthur C. Clarke and Stephen Baxter

- Authors: Arthur C. Clarke, Stephen Baxter
- Cover artist: David Stevenson
- Language: English
- Series: A Time Odyssey
- Genre: Science fiction
- Publisher: UK: Voyager; US: Del Rey
- Publication date: 29 March 2005
- Publication place: United Kingdom
- Media type: Print (hardcover)
- Pages: 336
- ISBN: 0-345-45250-X
- OCLC: 56982275
- Dewey Decimal: 823/.914 22
- LC Class: PR6005.L36 S86 2005
- Preceded by: Time's Eye
- Followed by: Firstborn

Sunstorm is a 2005 science fiction novel co-written by British writers Arthur C. Clarke and Stephen Baxter. It is the second book in the series A Time Odyssey. The books in this series are often likened to the Space Odyssey series, although the Time Odyssey novels ostensibly deal with time where the Space Odyssey novels dealt with space. The first book in the series was Time's Eye.

== Plot summary ==
Sunstorm opens with the last chapter of Time's Eye as its initial chapter, and Bisesa Dutt is in London, reunited with her daughter. It is 9 June 2037, the day after her helicopter was shot down in the North Western Frontier Province of Pakistan. The five years that she spent on Mir, an alternate Earth, are now only memories (though the fact that her body has aged five years since 8 June 2037, will eventually serve as some confirmation of her story).

In the meantime, a major solar event occurs on 9 June, disrupting virtually all of the Earth's electronic hardware. Dramatic as it is, this phenomenon is only a minor precursor of a far more massive solar eruption about five years off. Scientific models of the projected 2042 event make clear that the Earth will be sterilised completely by the upcoming solar burst. The effects will be so powerful as to even endanger astronauts on Mars.

Rather than sit by and allow the sun to just destroy all of Earth's life, political leaders (most notably the President of the Eurasian Union, Miriam Grec), and scientific leaders (led by Siobhan McGorran, the Astronomer Royal) decide to embark upon an ambitious plan to literally shield Earth from the worst effects of the storm. The plot is further complicated when information from Bisesa's odyssey suggests that what is happening to the sun is not simply a random happening in nature, but is rather the result of events set in motion by an alien intelligence over three millennia ago. Known as the Firstborn—since they were the first alien race to reach sentience, and thus are the most advanced civilization in existence in the universe—they are determined to stop later lifeforms from across the galaxy from infiltrating the stars, where they would increase entropy with energy usage and eventual wars, thus hastening the Universe's eventual heat death.

== Connections to other works by Clarke ==
Just as in Time's Eye, Baxter and Clarke pay small homage to 2001: A Space Odyssey with lines lifted from the earlier book.

- The first words of Athena, a sentient artificial intelligence in Sunstorm, are "Good morning, Colonel Tooke. This is Athena. I am ready for my first lesson." This is similar to the statement spoken by HAL and addressed to Dr. Chandra during his regression in 2001: A Space Odyssey, implied to also be HAL's first words.
- Additionally, in Sunstorm, Athena is talking to her partner in space, Colonel Bud Tooke, shortly before she is expected to lose consciousness. Athena says to Bud, "I have always had the greatest enthusiasm for the mission", echoing HAL's words to Dave Bowman on the Discovery.
- A character mentions that her daughter is working as a member of a team investigating a proposed space elevator. Space elevators play a major part in an earlier Clarke work The Fountains of Paradise.
- A lunar base named Clavius (possibly in the crater of the same name) appears in both 2001 and Time's Eye.
