= The Truth-Teller's Tale =

2005 novel by Sharon Shinn

- First edition
- Author: Sharon Shinn
- Cover artist: Matt Mahurin
- Language: English
- Series: Safe-Keepers Series
- Genre: Fantasy
- Publisher: Viking Juvenile
- Publication date: 2005
- Publication place: United States
- Media type: Print (Hardcover)
- Pages: 256 pp
- ISBN: 0-670-06000-3
- OCLC: 57893331
- LC Class: PZ7.S5572 Tru 2005
- Preceded by: Safe-Keeper's Secret
- Followed by: The Dream-Maker's Magic

The Truth-Teller's Tale is a medieval fantasy novel by American writer Sharon Shinn, published by Viking in 2005. The sequel to The Safe-Keeper's Secret (2004), the book was recommended for fifth-grade readers and up.

== Plot summary ==
Eleda and Adele, mirror twins, discover that they are a Truth-Teller and a Safe-Keeper, respectively. Truth-Tellers are incapable of telling lies and recognize when others are lying, so society relies on their unwavering trustworthiness. Safe-Keepers cannot reveal what is told to them in confidence, and they bear the burden of people's confessions. The sisters do not realize the ramifications of their gifts until their teen years, when romantic and political intrigue abounds, and situations become more adult. Their friend Roelynn, whose wealthy merchant father intends to marry her off to the prince, sows plenty of wild oats behind her father's back. She often drags the sisters into the fray, and the summer they are all 17, a chain of events is set into motion that changes their lives.

== Reception ==
A review in School Library Journal argued that while the novel is in some ways a "stereotypical teen romance", "Shinn has a beautiful turn of phrase and a knack for writing a sentence that will stop readers in their tracks." Kirkus Reviews said that while this novel lacks the "spiritual underpinnings and complexity of the first", Shinn had succeeded in writing an "engaging page-turner" that told a "captivating tale".
