= Archangel (Shinn novel) =

1997 novel by Sharon Shinn

- First edition
- Author: Sharon Shinn
- Cover artist: John Jude Palencar
- Language: English
- Series: Samaria series
- Genre: Science fantasy
- Publisher: Ace Books
- Publication date: May 1996
- Publication place: United States
- Media type: Print (Paperback)
- Followed by: Jovah's Angel

Archangel is a 1996 science fantasy novel by American writer Sharon Shinn. It is the first book in the Samaria series of novels.

== Plot summary ==
Angels and mortals, who need one another but have a love-hate relationship, inhabit the land of Samaria. The angels have wings and fly, and are taller and stronger than humans. Legends state that angels were made by Jovah to oversee Samaria under the guidance of the Archangel. The angels are supposed to protect humans, answer their petitions, solve their problems, and intercede to god for them by petitioning the god Jovah through song, especially for rain when the crops need it and the sun when it is stormy. In addition, the angels must sing to Jovah at the annual Gloria held on the Plain of Sharon, otherwise god would destroy the world. The Archangel and his consort, the Angelica, lead this mass in praise of Jovah. Archangels do not serve for life, but every twenty years Jovah selects a new Archangel.

Samaria is divided into three regions, Gaza, Bethel and Jordana, separated by rivers. Each region has an angel hold or fortress that acts as the governing center for the region. The citizens of Gaza, the Manadavvi, are highly cultured and wealthy. The Jansai, who are calculating and greedy merchants, and run the Edori slave trade inhabit Jordana. The Edori are the wanderers and frequently become enslaved by the Jansai.

The Oracle has declared that the angel Gabriel is to be the next Archangel. However, Raphael, the current Archangel, who is corrupt and uses his position for himself, does not want to step down. Gabriel has an additional problem in that he procrastinated getting married. He tracks down the mortal that god has selected be his wife, but she has her own thoughts about the marriage and the expectations of her as the archangel's consort, the Angelica. Rachel, an Edori slave, dislikes angels because of what they had done to her family when she was younger. Gabriel is faced with many trials having to contend with Raphael on the one hand, and his reluctant wife, who is a constant thorn-in-the-side. But the trials and tribulations confronting Gabriel and Rachel brings them close together and they finally realize that they love each other. The story ends with Gabriel and Rachael singing together at the Gloria, thus satisfying the wishes of the god.
