= Threshold (Palmer novel) =

1985 novel by David R. Palmer

- First edition
- Author: David R. Palmer
- Cover artist: Broeck Steadman
- Language: English
- Series: To Halt Armageddon
- Genre: Science fiction
- Publisher: Bantam Spectra
- Publication date: December 1985
- Publication place: United States
- Media type: Print (Paperback)
- ISBN: 0-553-24878-2 (first edition, paperback)
- OCLC: 13000483
- Preceded by: Emergence
- Followed by: Spēcial Education

Threshold is a science fiction novel by American writer David R. Palmer, published by Bantam Spectra in December 1985. It was his second book published, following Emergence, and was intended to be the first book of the To Halt Armageddon trilogy.

== Plot introduction ==
Threshold is a space opera novel, involving interstellar intrigue, mysteriously alluring space aliens, and a hero who is larger than life. Its protagonist, the penultimate issue of millennia long alien breeding program: Peter Cory, billionaire, hard driving adventurer, and unrequited rescuer of damsels. (Due to a "clerical" error in the program, his future wife was born late and is now only a child, but there is no time to wait.) One of the aliens, a "wWyh'j" (witch) named Megonthalyä (Meg) and her obese feline familiar (Memphus) come to Earth to enlist Peter's help.

== Plot summary ==
Due to what they call a "racial mental block" a quasi-immortal race called the Isi are unable to prevent a galactic catastrophe. The Isi think humanity (specifically Peter) will help them overcome this hurdle, hence the book's opening line "Peter, we are losing Armageddon..." Unless he joins forces with them "... the galaxy is doomed...!"

While Peter is understandably skeptical, the talking cat, as well as a crash course in telepathy, rapidly convince him of Meg's sincerity. Soon he is using his uniquely human perspective to unveil new applications of ancient Isi mental powers, and develops some startling new abilities. Armed with complete control of his cellular structure (which allows for slow but complete cellular metamorphosis), and a "gnNäáq" (knack) which allows the mental manipulation of electrical energy, Peter and Meg travel to Meg's home planet of Isis where he will be taught the "mMj'q" (Magic) necessary to help save the galaxy from its impending destruction.

== Publishing history ==
Threshold was first published in 1985 and reprinted in 1987 by Bantam Spectra. After being out of print for approximately two decades, Palmer made arrangements with Eric Flint's Ring of Fire Press in 2018 to have his works reprinted (ISBN 978-1948818193).

== Literary significance and criticism ==
Touted as the first book in a trilogy, subsequent novels have yet to be published, although the author has made it clear that the second book is indeed written. In 1990, Palmer pointed out that when his personal finances permitted taking time to survive off of slim publisher advances, he would return to writing.

A reviewer for Amazing Stories wrote in 2013 that the book is "easy to read, and has a fair smattering of clever repartee and wit."

== Sequel ==
Although written twenty years earlier, Spēcial Education (ISBN 978-1948818513), the long waited for sequel to Threshold, was finally released in September 2019 through Eric Flint's Ring of Fire Press.
