= General Winston's Daughter =

2007 novel by Sharon Shinn

- Author: Sharon Shinn
- Cover artist: Barry Marcus (photo), Linda McCarthy (design)
- Language: English
- Genre: Fantasy
- Publisher: Dutton Juvenile
- Publication date: October 18, 2007
- Publication place: United States
- Media type: Print (hardback)
- Pages: 352 pp
- ISBN: 0-670-06248-0
- OCLC: 132580558

General Winston's Daughter is a fantasy novel by American writer Sharon Shinn, published in 2007.

== Plot summary ==
Averie is thrilled to visit Chiarrin, a colonized land her father oversees as general of the Aebrian military. As the foreign rhythms of her new life sweep her along, the general's daughter begins to question the ethics and wisdom of colonial governance, depicted as a rough parallel to British rule during empire days. She delves into the culture, strains against the fussy restraints of her era and social class, and finds herself drawn to an officer of non-Aerbrian descent. But it is an interesting young woman from the marketplace, Jalessa, who truly opens a window into Chiarrizi culture. As political resistance begins to threaten colonial rule, security becomes tighter and tensions rise.

== Plot synopsis ==
Lady Averie Agatha Winston, known as Averie, is thrilled to finally leave Aebria, where she grew up, and visit Chiarrin, a colony of Aebria, where her father and her fiance work. Her father, the general who oversees the colony, and her fiance, a captain in the military, are much less thrilled and very protective. They warns her of the dangers of Chiarrin, and also tell her that the people here are not happy with Aebrian occupation. But Averie can see nothing but beauty in this new land she gets to explore.

She befriends a Chiarrin local named Jalessa when she buys traditional Chiarrizi dress, headscarf, and sandals, who teaches her the meaning of the colors of Chiarrin headscarves. However, Jalessa is injured by a bombing on the market, carried out by rebels who refuse to submit to Aebrian rule. Averie brings Jalessa back to her house and offers her a job as her maid. Jalessa accepts, and the two become good friends. Averie pushes the boundaries of the strict older Aebrians who are also in residence, but her peers are infatuated by her unwillingness to follow the rules if she doesn't think they are good rules. Averie also begins to fall in love with another soldier and realizes that she may not be in love with her betrothed anymore. Averie learns that Jalessa doesn't speak Aebrian and offers to teach her, expressing regret that her new friend has been unable to understand their conversations. Averie's uptight governess Lady Selkie helps Jalessa learn Aebrian. The boldness of the rebels increases and Averie starts to see a darker side to the Chiarrizi culture. Jalessa teaches her about their gods, all of whom have been crippled in one way or another, yet still stand tall. Their gods, Jalessa says, cannot be held captive.

Averie wakes up to smoke one morning. The entire city is burning. Chiarrin has sacrificed itself to drive out the Aebrian military. Jalessa reveals that she is a member of the rebels, and was the one who signaled the bombers when she was injured. The plan was to kill the Aebrian women until the men left. Because Averie taught her to speak Aebrian, she was able to spy on General Winston's plans. Averie realizes she knows nothing about Jalessa's family or anything important to her. She asks Jalessa if she will just let her die, and Jalessa tells her to get out of the city.

Averie returns home. Most of the officers she had befriended are dead, and she broke up with her fiance. Her father was killed getting men out of Chiarrin. She claims her fortune, and tells the man she's fallen in love with, Lieutenant Ket Du'Kai, that she's going to follow him until he marries her. He agrees to let her come with him as he goes back home to Xan'tai, another Aebrian colony.

== Characters ==
=== Lady Averie Agatha Winston ===
The protagonist of the series, Lady Averie Agatha Winston is the only child of General Winston. She is eighteen years old and the heiress of a large fortune. She has learned deportment and speaks Weskish, among other social arts. She is very outspoken and very confident.

==== Family ====
- Father: General Winston.
- Mother: A vain, beautiful woman who died when Averie was ten.
- Marital Status: Formerly engaged to Colonel Morgan Stode, currently involved with Lieutenant Ket Du'Kai.

=== Lieutenant Ket Du'Kai ===
Ket Du'Kai M'lesh is a Xantish officer in the Aeberelle army. He is twenty-five years old

==== Family ====
- Father: Du'Kai Chorav Shotay
- Mother: M'lesh Sovain Taz
- Marital Status: Currently involved with Lady Averie Winston.

=== Lady Selkirk ===
Lady Selkirk is Averie's governess and chaperone. She is a widow with two sons. She is highly disapproving of anything un-Aebrian or improper.

=== Lady Lana Worth ===
Mother: Beulah Worth

=== Colonel Morgan Stode ===
- Colonel Morgan Stode: a twenty-seven-year-old officer. He has no fortune, though he has been in the army for nearly ten years, and has risen quite rapidly through the ranks. He comes from a highly respected family, but his father committed suicide and left behind nothing but debts when Morgan was about ten or eleven. His sisters became governesses, but Morgan soon made enough money to buy them a house and support them all.

=== Jalessa ===
Has a husband, who Averie danced with at the Kyleeta She has two children, one son and one daughter.

=== General Winston ===
Top general in the Aeberelle army.

=== Aebrian Officers ===
- Captain Martin, described as being "shorter, more compact, and more classically handsome" than his friend Captain Gaele, was an officer who was highly sought after as a marriage prospect by the daughters of older officers. He had a more reserved but friendly personality. Captain Martin was killed in the rebellion of the Chiarrizi.
- Lieutenant Jamie Lansdale was an officer from a poor family and small prospects of promotion. His personality was described as "shy but soulful". He developed a crush on Lana Worth, which she moderately returned. He was killed in the rebellion of the Chiarrizi.
- Colonel Dryser was killed in the rebellion of the Chiarrizi.
- Captain Hawksley was a quiet but intense man who was killed in the rebellion of the Chiarrizi.
- Captain Rufus Gaele is "a big man with a big smile and a deep laugh", with an infectiously jolly personality. His head was gravely injured in the rebellion of the Chiarrizi.
- Major General Worth is an actor who was in the Piratica plays with Molly Faith. He is Salt Peter's younger brother and is two years older than Art. He has red hair and is very sensitive.
- Major Morrier was described by Lana Worth as a "dead bore".

== Xantish culture ==
Xan'tai is somewhat similar to African cultures on Earth.

=== Names ===
Names are given in the following order: Given name, father's given name, mother's given name.

=== Marriage ===
The Xan'tai do not believe in pre-marital sex. They believe in saving their bodies.

== Chiarrizi culture ==
Chiarrin is somewhat similar to the Middle Eastern or Indian cultures on Earth.

=== Headscarves ===
The headscarves worn by women in Chiarra relate various messages depending on their color:

- White - worn by young girls until their first menstrual bleeding
- Blue - worn by fertile, unmarried girls
- Blue entwined with green - worn by women who are engaged to be married
- Green - worn by married women and women whose children are grown and married
- Green entwined with gold and/or blue - worn by women with children: gold for boys, blue for girls
- Purple - worn by widows
- Green edged with purple - worn by remarried widows
- White edged with black - worn by women who have left their abusive husbands

Men also wear head coverings with meaningful colors. The meanings are the same, with two exceptions:

- White - worn until the boy reaches fifteen years of age
- Gold - worn after the boy reaches age fifteen; the equivalent of the female blue

General meanings of colors:

- Black - the color of danger
- Purple - the color of death
- Red - the color of celebration

=== Marriage ===
Chiarrizi usually practice pre-marital sexual intercourse. This is to determine whether there is a comfortable fit between partners and if they are able to please each other. In addition to this, property, looks, and personality play key roles in the selection of a marriage partner.

=== Language ===
Mua - means "my". Lota - means "heart". Dei - means "thanks". Sova - means "friend".

=== Cuisine ===
Meals are taken in the maroya, a long open room containing much furniture. Diners eat on foldable tables which are stored in a cache against a wall.

- Wikberries - bulbous purple fruits with a juicy, sweet taste.
- Bumain - squat yellow plants that resemble gourds. Soft to the touch. Peeled before eaten.
- Hodee - hodees are goatlike animals. They are raised as livestock by the Chiarrizi and provide meat and milk.
- Bread - mealy but tasty.
- Fish - not as common as hodee meat, but also part of the diet in Chezsa.

=== Religion ===
The Chiarrizi worship three gods:

==== Seena ====
A female predacious bird who has been wounded by an arrow through her chest. She rules the air and is the most popular god among women.

==== Kayla ====
A male fish whose eye was gouged out by a fisherman's hook. He rules the seas and is a popular god among the citizens of Chesza.

==== Doena ====
A male wolf or dog who was caught in a hunter's trap. Rather than let himself be caught and skinned, he gnawed his foreleg off and escaped. He rules the land and is the most popular god among men. The Chiarrizi pray at the temple, the Mualota fountain, or at home, where they may keep small statues or charms of their favorite god.

== Other countries ==
- Weskolia - involved in a long war with Aeberelle.
