= The Alleluia Files =

1998 novel by Sharon Shinn

- First edition
- Author: Sharon Shinn
- Cover artist: John Jude Palencar
- Language: English
- Series: Samaria series
- Genre: Science fantasy
- Publisher: Ace Books
- Publication date: 1998
- Publication place: United States
- Media type: Print (Paperback)
- Pages: 448
- ISBN: 978-0-441-00620-5
- OCLC: 41133590
- Preceded by: Jovah's Angel
- Followed by: Angelica

The Alleluia Files is a science fantasy novel by American writer Sharon Shinn, published in 1998. It is the third book in the Samaria series, although it is the last to take place chronologically.

== Plot summary ==
Generations ago, religious people built a colony spaceship called Jehovah. A planet called Samaria was established. The colony ship, orbiting above, was able to provide supplies and services. These were accessed by genetically modified 'angels', who were the only ones capable of performing the right vocal tones.

Over the generations, the concept of the ship was forgotten and it was believed Jehovah was an actual deity. Now factions of 'angels' fight against rebel forces called 'Jacobites'. The angels want to keep their power and the Jacobites wish to know the truth.
