= Assiti Shards series =

Fictional universe by author Eric Flint

The Assiti Shards series is a fictional universe invented by American author Eric Flint. It is a shared universe concerning several alternate history worlds, related to a prime timeline. The defining characteristic of the fictional universe is the existence of the "Assiti Shards effect", and the impact that strikes by Assiti Shards have on characters in the stories. The series is rather large and expansive, having started publication in 2000, and as of 2008, consisting of 15 print books, and 21 e-magazine anthologies, in two different published timelines of the same multiverse (only one work is in the second timeline). By 2026, the series had grown to include over 100 print books with over 120 e-magazine anthology issues in five different published timelines of the same multiverse.

== Assiti Shard ==
The Assiti Shards work by displacing bits of the world into other times and places, exchanging it with that which was there. These "shards", according to the fictional universe backstory, are waste byproduct of artworks created by the sophisticated and curious alien race known as the Assiti. The various stories involve shards striking the Earth and timeshifting characters into different periods and places.

== Multiverse ==
=== Ring of Fire ===
The first literary work in this fictional universe was 1632 (pub. 2000) by Eric Flint. This work led to a series of works that branched off this, into the Ring of Fire series (aka 1632 series). Most of the works in this fictional universe fall within this particular timeline. This timeline involves the displacement and exchange of the late 1990s mining town of Grantville, West Virginia with a piece of 1630s early modern southern Germany (in Thuringia).

Although 1632 was written as a stand-alone novel in 2000, Flint had planned several other universes using the Assiti Shards story premise. However, the sensation and interest engendered by the 1632 novel's publication subsequently caused the other works to be delayed while the 1632 series was developed.

This timeline was opened up to third-party authors, and open submissions. These are collected and published as the Grantville Gazettes, an online anthology magazine, focused solely on the Ring of Fire timeline. It is similar to Analog Science Fiction Science Fact, in that it publishes fiction and nonfiction. In this case, the nonfiction relates to the Ring of Fire timeline. The best stories, some commissioned, are collected into the Ring of Fire print anthology series.

Many of the major novels in the series are collaborations between Eric Flint and other authors. The series is considered broad and expansive.

=== Time Spike series ===
A second timeline was introduced by Eric Flint when he released the novel Time Spike with co-author Marilyn Kosmatka in 2008. This timeline involves several different periods in the history of Middle America, starting with a maximum security prison in the 2000s, along with Amerindians on the Trail of Tears, Spanish Conquistadors, a city of the Mound Builders, and some Paleoindians—all displaced into the Cretaceous period age of dinosaurs. The Assiti Shard in this universe took pieces from different geologic time periods from the Devonian period through the present and jumble them together in an affected area while placing this mixture on a Cretaceous earth.

==== Time Spike novel ====
The first work in the series, the 2008 novel Time Spike (ISBN 978-1-4391-3312-5), was written by Eric Flint and Marilyn Kosmatka. The main thread of the novel is about state maximum-security prison located in economically depressed downstate Illinois from the first decade of the 21st century being transported to a Cretaceous Earth during the middle of an evening shift change so that the prison would (theoretically be) twice the normal number of prison staff available at the prison at any given time but before regular administrators, such as the warden and other section heads, show up. A secondary thread covers 19th century Cherokees being forcibly escorted by U.S. Army troops from their homes in Georgia to their exile in what would later become Oklahoma along the Trail of Tears. A tertiary thread is about the scientists who were left behind on the original 21st century Earth who are analyzing the cause behind the Assiti Shards displacements and their fight against an American government who is trying to keep the event at the prison (and the previous displacement at Grantville) secret from the general public for unknown purposes.

==== Time Spike: The Mysterious Mesa ====
For over a decade from volume 39 in 2012 to volume 99 in 2022 of The Grantville Gazette, Garrett W. Vance had been writing an ongoing serial in the Time Spike universe that included Time Spike: The Good Samaritan and the Hanged Man, Time Spike: Evening in Cahokia, Time Spike: The Mysterious Mesa, and Time Spike: First Cavalry of the Cretaceous. Vance's stories were reissued as a single volume novel titled Time Spike: The Mysterious Mesa in 2018 (ISBN 978-1-948818-17-9), and was followed by a second volume titled Time Spike: The First Cavalry of the Cretaceous in 2022 (ISBN 978-1-956015-85-0), both published by Eric Flint's Ring of Fire Press. To date, these two books are the only other major works that is written in the Time Spike universe.

The story concerns the adventures of cavalry scout Nate Tucker of the newly formed Republic of Texas serving as a soldier in the United States Army Cavalry who was escorting the Cherokee during the Trail of Tears incident. Tucker befriends a Spaniard formerly serving in Hernando de Soto's 16th century expedition across North America. The two men encounter pre-Columbian Native Americans from different time periods ranging from the Neolithic to the Mississippian culture period.

Vance has yet to make an announcement on his plans for advancing the series after the closure of both The Grantville Gazette and the Ring of Fire Press that had occurred after Eric Flint's death in 2022.

Baen Books announced that they would release new versions of both Time Spike: The Mysterious Mesa (ISBN 978-1-964856-18-6) and Time Spike: The First Cavalry of the Cretaceous (ISBN 978-1-964856-60-5) in February and March 2026, respectively.

==== Dove's Time Spike short stories ====
From 2012 to 2017, author David W. Dove wrote three unrelated short stories in the Time Spike universe that were published in volumes 39, 41, and 74 of the Grantville Gazette.

=== Queen of the Seas series ===
This book series involved the transport of the 21st century cruise ship Queen of the Seas to the 4th century BCE Mediterranean and how 21st century technology affects the successors to Alexander the Great's vast empire.

==== The Alexander Inheritance ====
This novel by Eric Flint with Paula Goodlett and Gorg Huff was released by Baen in July 2017 (ISBN 978-1-4814-8348-3). The cause of the displacement was described as "An Assiti Shard transposes a modern cruise liner into the Mediterranean just after the death of Alexander the Great." The passengers and crew include a historian, a Norwegian cruise ship captain, a French first officer for navigation who was a competitive pistol marksman while previously serving in the French Navy, and an American congressman, who are thrown back in time during the period of the Diadochi, when one of world's largest empires was being split apart by civil war.

==== The Macedonian Hazard ====
The Macedonian Hazard, the second novel in the Queen of the Seas series was released in January 2021 (ISBN 978-1-9821-2586-8). The book picks up where The Alexander Inheritance had left off with when Olympias, Alexander's mother, shows up at the ship.

==== The Sicilian Coil ====
The Sicilian Coil is the third novel set in the Queen of The Seas series that was released in September 2021 (ISBN 978-1-956015-13-3) by Ring of Fire Press. This side-line novel, which does not directly involve the main characters, is published by Ring of Fire Press. This novel covers events in the region of Sicily and the Italian Peninsula that coincide with the events in the novel The Macedonian Hazard, from the viewpoints of characters who have left the Queen of the Seas to work with Rome and other cities in the region providing technical knowledge and radio communication links.

After the sudden demise of Ring of Fire Press in August 2022, the authors regained the copyrights to their books and they made arrangements to have this title be privately re-released on Amazon in September 2022 (ISBN 979-8354924882).

==== The Carthaginian Crisis ====
The Carthaginian Crisis is the fourth novel set in the Queen of The Seas series that was released in June 2024 (ISBN 979-8328591003) and was published independently by the Huff and Goodlett via Amazon. This book is a continuation of The Sicilian Coil and The Macedonian Hazard and starts with the war in Babylon against Antigonus One-eye that was mentioned toward the end of The Macedonian Hazard.

==== Cooper's Queen of the Seas short stories ====
Starting with the first issue of 1632 & Beyond, Iver Cooper began to write several unrelated short stories in the Queen of the Seas universe. In the first issue (September 2023; ISBN 978-1962398008), Cooper wrote Into the Dark, a short story that could be the start of a possible serial concerning a Queen of the Seas's crew member who was recruited to lead a group of ship peoples to search remote tropical island caves for sources of bat guano that could be used in the manufacturer of gun powder. In the fourth issue (March 2024; ISBN 978-1962398077), Cooper wrote The Birds of the Muses about a 21st century bee keeper.

=== Other time threads ===
==== The Crossing ====
The Crossing (ISBN 978-1-9821-9201-3) is a 2022 novel by Kevin Ikenberry set in the Assiti Shards milieu about a time displaced 2008 ROTC squad sent back to the 1776 Battle of Trenton. In a secondary thread, the scientists who were fighting the American governmental cover-up that was introduced in Time Spike continue on with their work analyzing and predicting the time displacements while the government continue to spread more mis-information to the general public.

A reviewer of this book wrote that this book is "tight and concise" and "makes for a great Independence Day read". Another reviewer wrote that the author "wastes no words, and the result is compulsively readable."

==== An Angel Called Peterbilt ====
In July 2023, Baen Books and Simon & Schuster announced the February 2024 release of the new novel by Eric Flint, Gorg Huff and Paula Goodlett called An Angel Called Peterbilt (ISBN 978-1982193195) that is an expansion of the unfinished novella that Flint was working on called An Angel Named Peterbilt at the time of his death in July 2022.

A review of this book wrote that this book "offers a fresh beginning to a long-running series. The authors offer new possibilities, with fascinating ramifications."

== See also ==
- The Emberverse series
- Nantucket series
- A Time Odyssey
- To Turn the Tide
- List of books published by Ring of Fire Press
