= Ryk E. Spoor =

American science fiction and fantasy author

- Born: Omaha, Nebraska, U.S.
- Occupations: Novelist, short story author
- Writing career
- Period: 2003–present
- Genres: Science fiction, Fantasy
- Website: www.grandcentralarena.com

Ryk E. Spoor is an American science fiction and fantasy author, who also writes research grant proposals for a technology firm. He published his first novel, Digital Knight, in 2003, and has gone on to publish over a dozen more novels, often in collaboration with author Eric Flint on their Boundary series. He is nicknamed "seawasp" or "Sea Wasp", an online handle he has been using since 1977 in venues such as LiveJournal, Dreamwidth and Usenet.

== Reception of his published works ==
Digital Knight (2003) reached number 10 on Locus Magazine Bestsellers for paperbacks for the month of January 2004. A reviewer for the Shiny Book Review called Spoor's first published work "fun, fast read about things that go bump in the night" and "a fine debut novel that does just about everything right".

In reviewing the novel Grand Central Arena, the reviewer for the Shiny Book Review called the book "an intelligently written space opera with a great deal to recommend it" but was concerned about the relatively slow start of the novel when compared with Spoor's previous work. Although the reviewer for the Fantasy Book Critic thought that "the novel sags a little in the middle", the reviewer gave a very positive review and calls the book a "space opera in the grand old tradition... but with modern sensibilities and awareness of current speculations in cutting edge physics."

In reviewing the 2006 co-authored novel Boundary, the reviewer for the publication SFRevu wrote that "It's refreshing to have a book with soldiers, scientists, and secret agents, all of whom, even when having differing orders, still find ways to actually work together for the common good." The reviewer also wrote that the authors introduces a lot of technical wiz-gimmickry in a way that "it's done smoothly enough that you don't feel like you're being given a lecture". The reviewer for SFFWorld wrote that he "thoroughly enjoyed Boundary" and "found it to be a quick and easy read, one where I was continuously kept interested on what would come next, and where it would lead from there." The reviewer also wrote that "Flint and Spoor have created a memorable cast of characters and have injected a real sense of wonder into the narrative".

The 2010 co-authored novel Threshold reached number 11 on the Wall Street Journal Best-Selling Books list for Hardcover Science Fiction for a week in June 2010. The book also reached number 9 on Publishers Weekly's Sci-Fi Bestseller List for a week in June 2012. A reviewer for Publishers Weekly wrote "fast-paced sci-fi espionage thriller [that] is light in tone and hard on science and a fine choice for any collection".

In reviewing the 2013 co-authored novel Portal, the reviewer for Astro Guyz wrote that "Portal is hard science fiction in the tradition of Ben Bova, Hal Clement and Arthur C. Clarke."

Reviewers for Flint and Spoor's 2015 book Castaway Planet were less favorable. The reviewer for Rosboch Book Reviews wrote that although the reviewer mildly enjoyed the struggles of the Kimei family, they "found the writing verging wildly into corny far too often" and thought that the "story is predictable and bland", unlike the previous books in the series. The reviewer for Koeur's Book Reviews wrote that the "novel went from really good to really bad, really fast. Almost like two different authors wrote separate halves." A reviewer of the book's 2016 sequel Castaway Odyssey wrote in The Daily News that the book "a fun adventure, reminiscent of Heinlein's juveniles".

Publishers Weekly describes Spoor's 2017 novel Princess Holy Aura as "Spoor’s affable horror fantasy [in which] a 35-year-old man must transform into a 14-year-old girl to save the world from a Lovecraftian menace." The same reviewer also wrote that "The Lovecraftian abominations are sufficiently over-the-top and the fight scenes are lively, but awkward dialogue and lots of exposition bog down the already overstuffed narrative." A reviewer for PopCultHQ found the book "hilariously enjoyable and had trouble putting it down."

== Bibliography ==
- Digital Knight (2003), ISBN 0-7434-7161-X (set in the Zarathan / Zahralandar Multiverse); the publisher also made this publication available as a free digital download.
- Diamonds Are Forever (2004; in the anthology Mountain Magic), ISBN 0-7434-8856-3; story reissued separately in 2020 ISBN 978-1948818827
- Paradigms Lost (2014); a revised and expanded version of Digital Knight, ISBN 978-1625793355 (set in the Zarathan/Zahralandar Multiverse)
  - Revised and expanded edition (October 2021) ISBN 978-1956015201
- Polychrome: A Romantic Fantasy (April 2015); a novel set in L. Frank Baum's Land of Oz and featuring the titular Oz character, ISBN 978-1619910140
- Princess Holy Aura (December 2017), ISBN 978-1481482820
- Legend (March 2019), ISBN 978-1948818292 (set in the Zarathan/Zahralandar Multiverse)
- Fenrir (June 2025) with Eric Flint, ISBN 978-1-6680-7266-0. Last hard science fiction book that was written by this pair.

=== Boundary Series ===
(Set in the same fictional universe as the Castaway series)

- Boundary (March 2006) with Eric Flint, ISBN 978-1-4165-0932-5

Second edition (October 2016), revised with added material ISBN 978-1-62579-545-8

- Threshold (June 2010) with Eric Flint, sequel to Boundary, ISBN 978-1-4391-3360-6
- Portal (May 2013) with Eric Flint, second sequel to Boundary, ISBN 978-1-4516-3896-7
- "Skyspark" (2013), short story

=== Arenaverse ===
1. Grand Central Arena (May 2010), ISBN 978-1-4391-3355-2
2. Spheres of Influence (November 2013), ISBN 978-1-4516-3937-7
3. Challenges of the Deep (2017), ISBN 978-1-62579-564-9
4. Shadows of Hyperion (May 2021), ISBN 978-1953034847

=== Balanced Sword Series ===
(Set in the Zarathan/Zahralandar Multiverse)

1. Phoenix Rising (November 2012), ISBN 978-1-4516-3841-7
2. Phoenix in Shadow (May 2015), ISBN 978-1-4767-8037-5
3. Phoenix Ascendant (March 2016), ISBN 978-1-4767-8129-7

=== Castaway Series ===
(Set in the same fictional universe as the Boundary series)

- "Disaster" (2015), short story
- Castaway Planet (February 2015) with Eric Flint, third sequel to Boundary, start of a new trilogy in the same universe, ISBN 978-1-4767-8027-6
- Castaway Odyssey (October 2016) with Eric Flint, sequel to Castaway Planet, ISBN 978-1-4767-8181-5
- Castaway Resolution (March 2020) with Eric Flint, sequel to Castaway Odyssey, ISBN 978-1982124410

=== Demons of the Past ===
(Set in the Zarathan/Zahralandar Multiverse)

- Demons of the Past: Revelation (April 2018), ISBN 978-1987625196
- Demons of the Past: Revolution (October 2018), ISBN 978-1948818131
- Demons of the Past: Retribution (March 2019), ISBN 978-1948818278

=== Godswar Series ===
(Set in the Zarathan/Zahralandar Multiverse)

- Godswar: The Mask of Ares (June 2020), ISBN 1948818906
- Godswar: The Spear of Athena (February 2021), ISBN 978-1953034564

=== Spirit Warriors Series ===
(Set in the Zarathan/Zahralandar Multiverse)

- The Spirit Warriors: Choosing the Players (forthcoming)

=== Books co-authored with wife Kathleen Moffre-Spoor ===
==== Fall of Veils series ====
- French Roast Apocalypse: Volume One: Fall of Veils (April 2018) ISBN 978-1987623741
- Jamaica Blue Magic (September 2020) ISBN 978-1953034120
