= Emergence (Palmer novel) =

1984 novel by David R. Palmer

- First Edition cover of Emergence
- Author: David R. Palmer
- Cover artist: Jim Burns
- Language: English
- Series: Emergence trilogy
- Genre: Science fiction
- Publisher: Bantam Spectra
- Publication date: November 1984
- Publication place: United States
- Media type: Print (Paperback)
- ISBN: 0-553-25519-3 (first edition, paperback)
- OCLC: 12968116
- Followed by: Tracking

Emergence is a science fiction novel by American writer David R. Palmer. It first appeared as a novella published in Analog Science Fiction in 1981; the same magazine also published Part II, "Seeking", in 1983. The completed novel then was published by Bantam in 1984. The plot follows a precocious 11-year-old orphan girl, living in a post-apocalyptic United States. It had three printings through July 1985, and was republished in 1990 as a "Signature Special Edition" with a few minor edits and a new afterword by the author.

Emergence was Palmer's first published novel. It was developed from a pair of Hugo and Nebula award nominated novellas originally published in Analog magazine. The novel itself was nominated for a Hugo Award, a pair of Locus Awards (for first novel and science fiction novel), was a finalist for a Philip K. Dick Award, and won the Compton Crook Award.

Palmer's sequel to Emergence, entitled Tracking, was serialized in Analog in 2008. Wormhole Press was short-listed to release Tracking and re-release Emergence as both paperbacks and in hardcover, but by October 2010 the publisher appeared to be out of business. After the novel being out of print and hard to find for over a decade, Palmer made arrangements with Eric Flint's Ring of Fire Press in 2018 to have his works reprinted.

== Plot summary ==
Candidia Maria Smith-Foster, an eleven-year-old girl, is unaware that she is a Homo post hominem, mankind's next evolutionary step. Hominems have higher IQs, they're stronger, faster, more resistant to illness and trauma, and have quicker reflexes. Their eyesight, hearing, and sense of smell are also superior.

By the time the narrative opens, Candy has acquired a high school education, some college, and learned karate, having achieved her Fifth Degree Black Belt from her neighbor, 73-year-old Soo Kim McDivott, who she is led to believe is merely a retired schoolteacher. McDivott, whom she calls "Teacher", is actually the discoverer of the H. post hominem species, and has identified and continues to mentor and lead a group of them, the AAs. As part of her karate training, she has learned to release her hysterical strength, which permits brief bursts of nearly superhuman activity.

With international relations rapidly deteriorating, Candy's father, publicly a small-town pathologist but secretly a government biowarfare expert, is called to Washington. Candy remains at home.

The following day a worldwide attack, featuring a bionuclear plague, wipes out virtually all of humanity (i.e., Homo sapiens). With pet bird Terry, a Hyacinthine macaw, her "lifelong retarded, adopted twin brother," who tends to "parrot" Candy's words even before she speaks, she survives the attack in the shelter beneath their house. Emerging three months later, she learns of her genetic heritage and sets off to search for others of her kind.

First the hunt turns up "Adam", a cheeky, irrepressibly punning, multitalented 13-year-old boy, who immediately sets out to win Candy's heart; next, Rollo Jones, a middle-aged physician with a broad history of survival-in-the-wilds experience ranging from a stint in the Peace Corps to mountain climbing; and finally, Kim Melon, an early-20s mom whose background is in computer engineering with Lisa, her six-year-old daughter. Rollo reveals himself as a sociopath, whom Candy is forced to kill defending Terry and herself. Adam, Kim, and Lisa join Candy's quest for the AA community. As part of the search, Adam reveals that he is an ultralight aircraft pilot. Later he teaches Candy to fly.

Thereafter, an ultralight engine failure separates Candy from the others. After getting it running again, she spots a contrail, which leads her to Vandenberg Space Shuttle Launch Complex, where Teacher and the AAs are laboring to preflight a shuttle, renamed the Nathan Hale. They have identified those who wiped out mankind, the Bratstvo, translated as the "Brotherhood", a cabal of H. sapiens, working from inside the Russian military to destroy all H. post hominems. As insurance, they have placed a doomsday device in geosynchronous orbit, a Strontium-90 bomb whose fallout will render Earth uninhabitable for 200 years.

At this point, however, the AAs' plans have come unstuck: They have modified the Hale to reach geosynch orbit, though it is a one-way, suicide voyage for the crew; but the miniature robot handler they have built to penetrate the bomb-carrying rocket and disarm the doomsday device is not up to the task. Candy realizes, with her small size and hysterical strength training, she is the only one who can get inside the warhead chamber and disarm the bomb. Despite the fact that it is a suicide mission, she volunteers.

Meanwhile, as Adam, Kim, and Lisa search for Candy, Terry begins relaying her thoughts, though initially they do not realize that is what they're hearing.

Arriving in orbit, Kyril Svetlanov, thought to be a Bratstvo defector, kills Harris Gilbert, the mission commander. Kyril turns out to have been a double agent, whose job ultimately was to sabotage the mission, but he does not know about Candy's karate skills. She breaks his neck and assumes responsibility for completing the mission.

Navigating across to the bomb-carrying rocket in a spacesuit, she disables the warhead. Then she resets the navigational computer to land on the dry lake at Edwards Air Force Base and tries to secure herself against a bulkhead in preparation for the stresses of reentry.

As the missile begins to power-up for reentry, Adam finally realizes Terry is in fact relaying Candy's thoughts; that somehow she is in fact in space, about to attempt reentry in a non-human-rated vehicle, and that she'll soon be landing at Edwards. He, Kim, and Lisa arrive as the missile is touching down, just in time to extract her, resuscitate her, and treat her injuries.

The author has left a number of threads trailing at the conclusion, some of which are followed-up on 25 years later in a sequel entitled Tracking, serialized in Analog Science and Fact magazine in the summer and fall of 2008.

== Style ==
The book is a first-person narrative, written in the form of Candy's journal, in telegraphic style, which is based on the means employed by those sending telegrams to save money. At that time telegrams were the quickest way to transmit hardcopy messages over significant distances. They were expensive; Western Union charged by the word. Hence unnecessary words were omitted: pronouns, conjunctions, most adjectives and/or adverbs.

The primary narrator's voice in Emergence is thus a sort of "verbal shorthand", and she wrote her journal in Pitman shorthand.

== Novellas ==
Emergence, which won the Compton Crook Award in 1985, arose from a novella by the same title featured in the January 1981 issue of Analog. This was followed by the February 1983 Analog publication of the "Seeking" novella, which ultimately became part two of the novel. Thereafter the "Emergence" novella appeared in an anthology called Children of the Future. Both novellas also won reader's choice awards from Analog, and were nominated for the Hugo Award for Best Novella in their respective years, and the novel for best novel in 1985.

== Literary significance and reception ==
Reviews were all favorable, both contemporary reviews and those written decades later. Many of the reviewers compare this work with that of Robert A. Heinlein. Although some of the reviewers commented that they needed to suspend their disbelief when the number of improbable events occurring toward the end of the story seems to magnify, but the story was still fun to read.

Dave Langford reviewed Emergence for White Dwarf #92, and stated that "Finale close-run victory of narrative thrust over blatant plot devices (doomsday weapon access hatch big enough for space-suited eleven year old only, carrier vehicle handily reprogrammable to enable safe landing ... ). Is good fun."
