= David R. Palmer =

American science fiction author (born 1941)

- Born: David Reay Palmer; March 1941 (age 85); Northern Chicago suburbs
- Occupation: Science fiction novelist
- Writing career
- Years active: 1981–present
- Genre: Science Fiction
- Notable awards: 1985 Compton Crook Award

David Reay Palmer (born March 1941) is an American science fiction author. His works have been nominated three times for Hugo Awards.

== Biography ==
Palmer was born at Chicago and studied at Highland Park High School. He is married and lives in Florida, where he had worked as a court reporter.

== Writing career ==
Palmer's first novel, Emergence, won the Compton Crook Award in 1985. It arose from a novella by the same title featured in the January 1981, issue of Analog. This was followed by the February 1983, Analog publication of the Seeking novella, which ultimately became part two of the novel. Thereafter the Emergence novella appeared in an anthology called Analog's Children of the Future. Both novellas also won reader's choice awards from Analog. Both were nominated for the Hugo Award for Best Novella in their respective years, and the novel for Best Novel in 1985.

A sequel to Emergence, Tracking, was serialized in three parts, beginning in the July/August 2008 issue of Analog. Tracking was continued in the September issue and concluded in the October issue of the magazine.

His second novel, Threshold (ISBN 0-553-24878-2), was published as the first book in the To Halt Armageddon trilogy in 1985. The "About the Author" section of Threshold states that David is "currently working on the sequel to Threshold, also to be published by Bantam", to be called Spēcial Education, which was eventually published in 2019 by Eric Flint's Ring of Fire Press. He stated in the afterword to the 1990 edition of Emergence that any future writing would depend upon his finances.

Palmer has another completed but unpublished novel, Schrödinger's Frisbee, which is not related to either of his first two novels. After sitting on his desk for almost 13 years, this book was finally released by Ring of Fire Press in 2021.

Wormhole Press had been indicated as a possible publisher for the new novels and for a reprinting of both Emergence and Threshold. The author had stated on Facebook (19 Dec 2014) that cover illustrations were in production and following that Wormhole Press will move into hardcover and e-book publication.

After his works being out of print and hard to find for over a decade, Palmer later made arrangements with Eric Flint's Ring of Fire Press in 2018 to have his works reprinted starting with the reissue of Emergence in June 2018.

== Bibliography ==
=== Emergence series ===
- Emergence (1984), 978-1948818063 (2018 reprint)
- Tracking, (2008), published as single volume, 978-1948818391 (2019 reprint)
  - "Tracking - part 1". Analog. 128 (7&8). July–August 2008.
  - "Tracking - part 2". Analog. 128 (9): 90–133. September 2008.
  - "Tracking - part 3". Analog. 128 (10): 86–133. October 2008.

=== To Halt Armageddon series ===
- Threshold (1985), 978-1948818193 (2018 reprint)
- Spēcial Education (2019) 978-1948818513

=== Other novels ===
- Schrödinger's Frisbee (2021) 978-1953034922

== Sources ==
- Jay Kay Kline's "Biolog" for David R. Palmer appeared in the February 1983 Analog Science Fiction and Fact with the novella "Seeking", p 61.
- Locus Online's list of awards and nominations
