= Mons Pico =

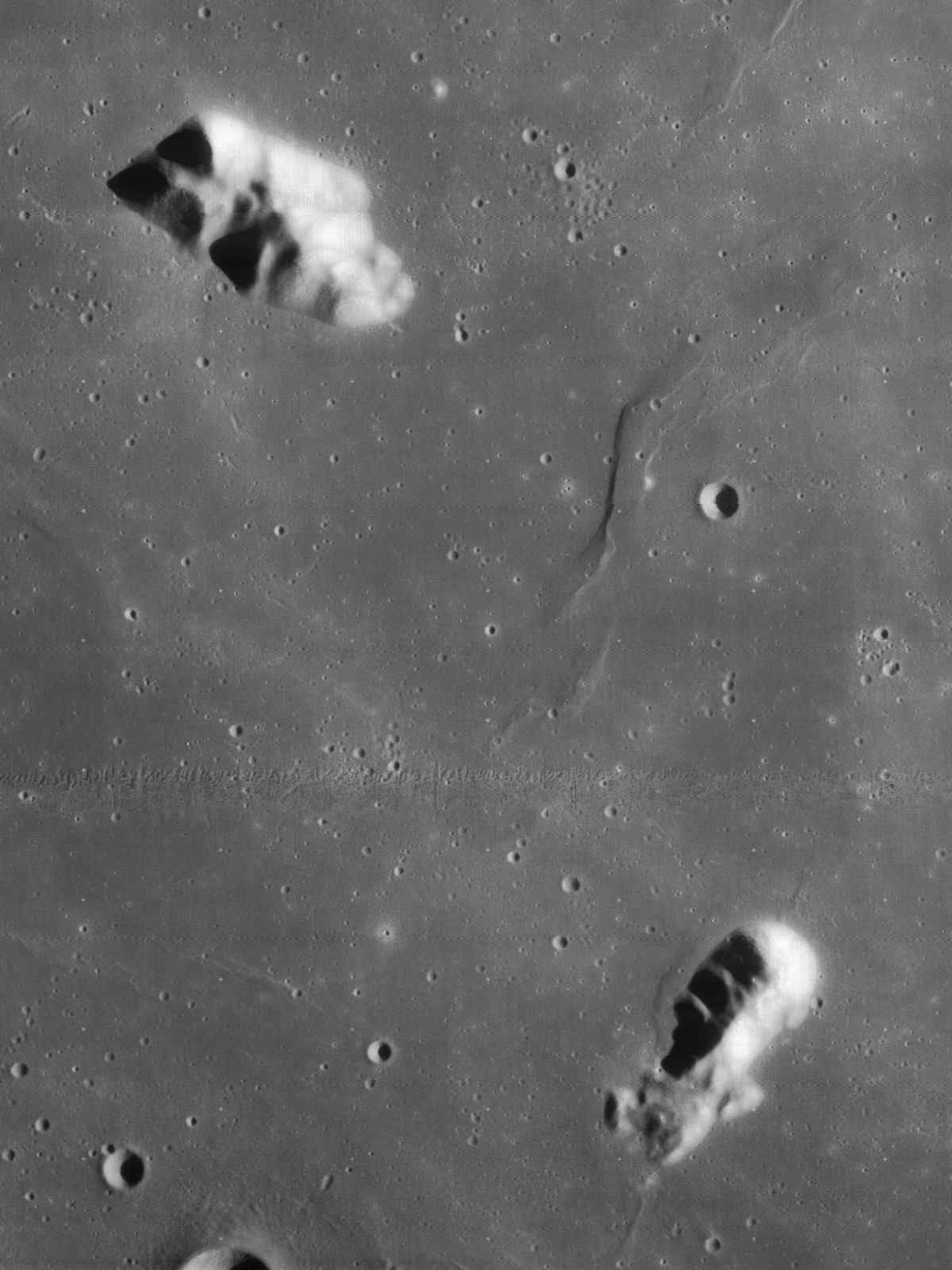
- Mons Pico (upper left) and Pico β (lower right). Lunar Orbiter 4 image.

Highest point
- Elevation: 2,450 m
- Listing: Lunar mountains
- Coordinates: 45.7°N 8.9°W

Geography
- Location: the Moon

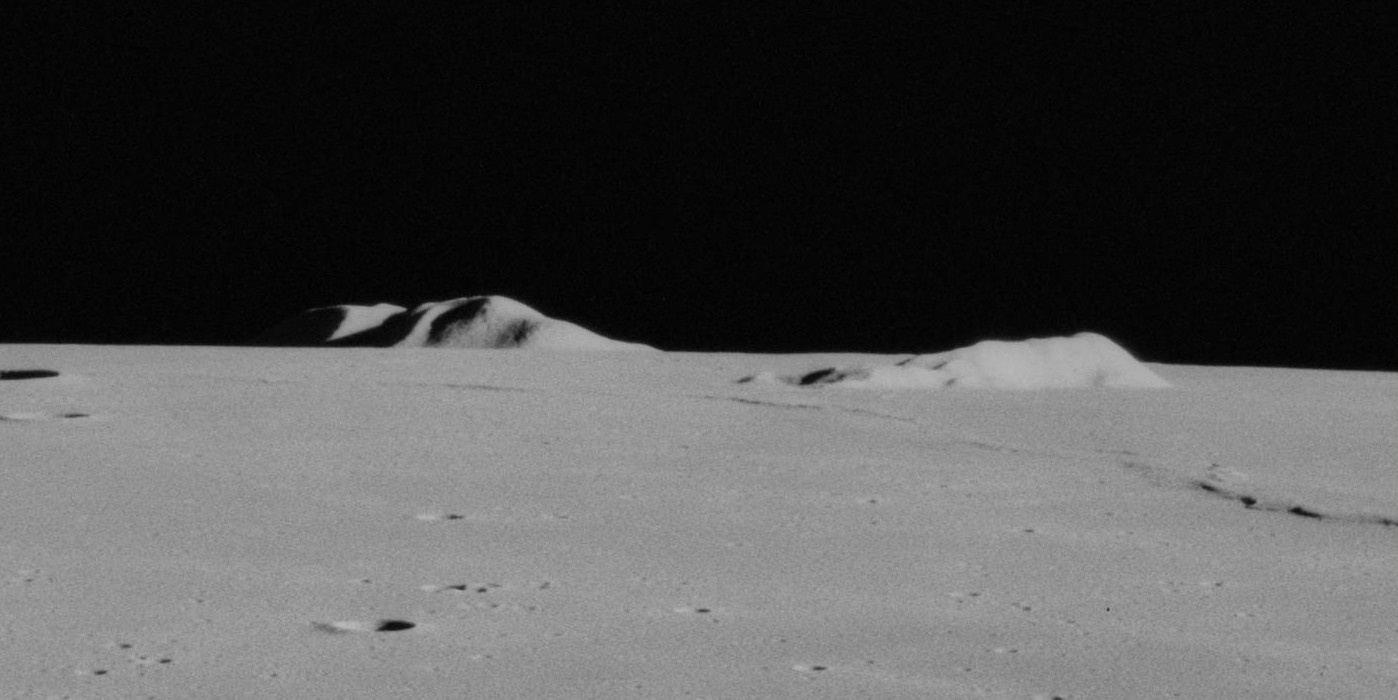
Oblique Apollo 15 image of Pico (left) and Pico β (right). NASA/JSC/Arizona State University.

Mons Pico is a solitary lunar mountain that lies in the northern part of the Mare Imbrium basin, to the south of the dark-floored crater Plato and on the southern rim of a ghost crater. This peak forms part of the surviving inner ring of the Imbrium basin, continuing to the northwest and with the Montes Teneriffe and Montes Recti ranges, and probably to the southeast with the Montes Spitzbergen. This mountain feature is thought to have been named by Johann Hieronymus Schröter for Pico del Teide on Tenerife.

== Description ==
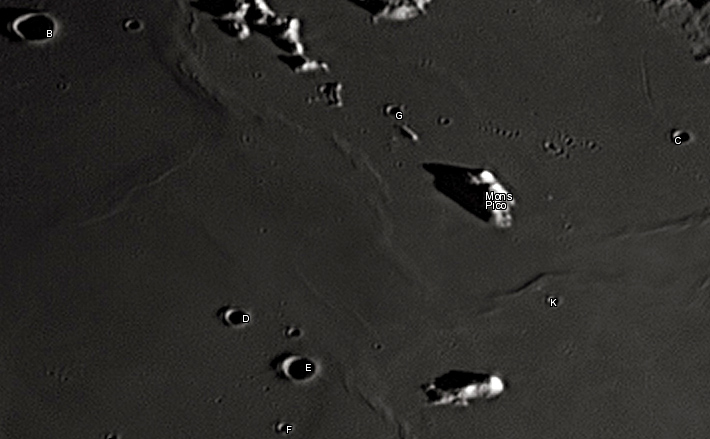
Region around Mons Pico with labeled satellite craters

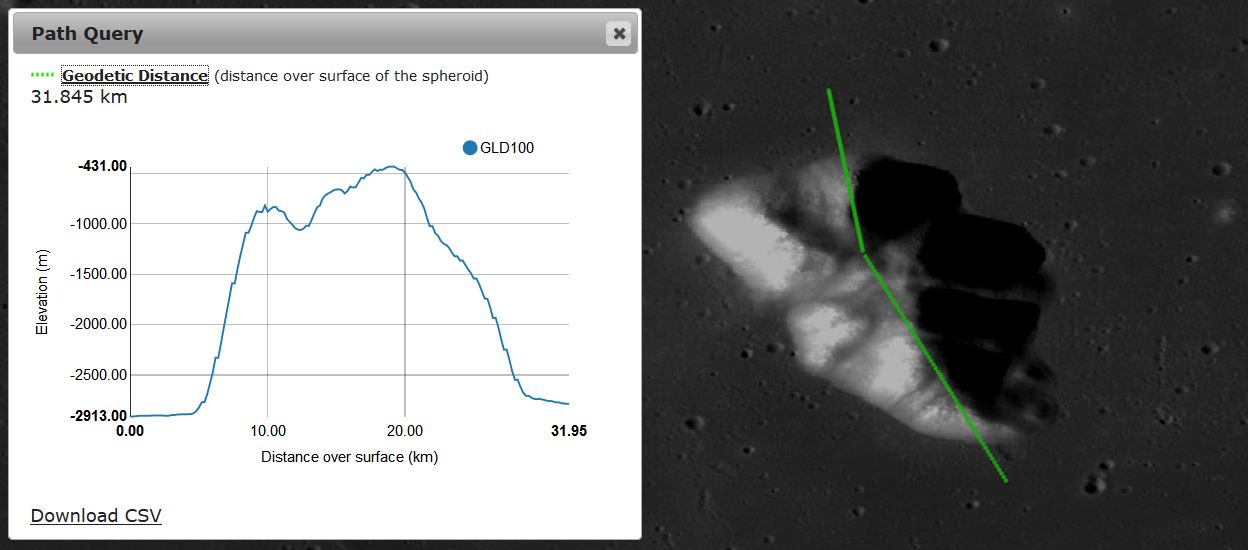
Mons Pico, from Lunar Reconnaissance Orbiter data, with elevation line across the peaks (elevation from line top to bottom.)

Mons Pico forms an elongated feature with a length of 25 kilometers (oriented northwest–southeast) and a width of 15 km. The peak rises to a height of 2.4 km, comparable to the maximum altitude of the Montes Teneriffe. The mountain itself is a very reflective and bright object.

Due to its isolated location on the lunar mare, this peak can form prominent shadows when illuminated by oblique sunlight. It is also known as a location of Transient Lunar Anomalies.

A smaller peak to the southeast of Mons Pico is sometimes called Mons Pico β (Beta). This region of the mare contains a number of wrinkle ridges.

== Satellite craters ==
By convention these features are identified on lunar maps by placing the letter on the side of the crater midpoint that is closest to Mons Pico.

Pico	Latitude	Longitude	Diameter
B	46.5° N	15.3° W	12 km
C	47.2° N	6.6° W	5 km
D	43.4° N	11.3° W	7 km
E	43.0° N	10.3° W	9 km
F	42.2° N	10.2° W	4 km
G	46.6° N	10.4° W	4 km
K	44.6° N	7.5° W	3 km

== Pico in fiction ==
Strange objects appear near Pico in the 1957 science fiction novel Blast Off at Woomera by Hugh Walters; their fate is further expanded upon in the sequels The Domes of Pico and Operation Columbus.

Pico is the site of a climactic space battle in Arthur C. Clarke's novel Earthlight. It is also mentioned in passing in his novel 3001: The Final Odyssey as a storage repository of both biological and computer viruses, and in his short story "The Sentinel" (in which Wilson, the protagonist, mentions having climbed it).

Pico is mentioned in the Jules Verne novel Around the Moon as the three main characters observe it from their spacecraft. Two of the travelers, Nichol and Ardan, suggest christening the nearby unnamed peak Barbicane, in honor of the third.

== See also ==
- List of mountains on the Moon
- Mount Pico
