= Moon Base One =

1960 novel by Hugh Walters

- First edition cover shows Chris Godfrey with friends Serge, Morrey and Tony in mysterious grey mist
- Author: Hugh Walters
- Cover artist: Leslie Wood
- Language: English
- Series: Chris Godfrey of U.N.E.X.A
- Genre: Science fiction novel
- Publisher: Faber
- Publication date: 1960
- Publication place: United Kingdom
- Media type: Print (Hardback)
- Pages: 192
- Preceded by: Operation Columbus
- Followed by: Expedition Venus

Moon Base One is a young adult science fiction novel, the fourth in Hugh Walters' Chris Godfrey of U.N.E.X.A. series. It was published in the UK by Faber in 1960, in the US by Criterion Books in 1962 under the title Outpost on the Moon.

== Plot summary ==
Thousands of young people are terminally ill as a result of the radiation produced by the lunar structures destroyed in The Domes of Pico. In an attempt to determine whether the fall-out from the domes can have a curative effect on the disease a joint east–west mission is planned under the auspices of the newly formed United Nations EXploration Agency (UNEXA).

The mission is commanded by Chris Godfrey, accompanied by American, Morrison 'Morrey' Kant and Russian Serge Smyslov. The 'patient' will be Tony Hale, from Aston near Birmingham (who goes on to feature in the rest of the series). The mission starts well, but is soon in trouble when a supply rocket crashes...
