= First Contact? =

1971 novel by Hugh Walters

- First edition
- Author: Hugh Walters
- Cover artist: Leslie Wood
- Language: English
- Series: Chris Godfrey of U.N.E.X.A
- Genre: Science fiction novel
- Publisher: Faber
- Publication date: 1971
- Publication place: United Kingdom
- Media type: Print (Hardback)
- Pages: 174
- ISBN: 0-571-09757-X
- OCLC: 3206928
- LC Class: PZ7.W1715 Fg
- Preceded by: Nearly Neptune
- Followed by: Passage to Pluto

First Contact? is a juvenile science fiction novel, the thirteenth in Hugh Walters' Chris Godfrey of U.N.E.X.A. series.

It was published in the UK by Faber in 1971, in the US by T.Nelson Books in 1973.

== Plot summary ==
Radio signals begin flooding Earth from the vicinity of Uranus and two ships, each with a crew of four are sent to investigate. The signals are traced to an alien spaceship on Ariel, one of the moons of Uranus. The ships land and all but two enter the alien vessel to converse with the apparently friendly humanoid alien, Vari. One of the two remaining crewmen believe the alien to be malevolent and determines to destroy it.
