= Nearly Neptune =

1969 novel by Hugh Walters

- First edition
- Author: Hugh Walters
- Cover artist: Leslie Wood
- Language: English
- Series: Chris Godfrey of U.N.E.X.A
- Genre: Science fiction
- Publisher: Faber
- Publication date: 1969
- Publication place: United Kingdom
- Media type: Print (Hardback)
- Pages: 165
- ISBN: 0-571-09111-3
- Preceded by: The Mohole Mystery
- Followed by: First Contact?

Nearly Neptune is a juvenile science fiction novel by British writer Hugh Walters, the twelfth in his Chris Godfrey of U.N.E.X.A. series. It was published in the UK by Faber in 1969 and in the US by Washburn Books under the title Neptune One is Missing.

As one of the best of the series, it is very collectable and changes hands at sums of £100-£200 on trading sites.

== Plot summary ==
The book begins by announcing the death of Chris Godfrey and his three fellow astronauts after a fire and apparent break-up of their spacecraft as it approaches the orbit of Neptune as observed from Earth. The crew have however survived but are stranded as their hypothermia equipment is irreparably damaged.
