= Blast Off at Woomera =

1957 book by Hugh Walters

- First edition
- Author: Hugh Walters
- Cover artist: Leslie Wood
- Language: English
- Series: Chris Godfrey of U.N.E.X.A
- Genre: Science fiction novel
- Publisher: Faber
- Publication date: 1957
- Publication place: United Kingdom
- Media type: Print (hardback)
- Pages: 187
- OCLC: 30163717
- Dewey Decimal: 823.91
- Followed by: The Domes of Pico

Blast Off at Woomera is a children's science fiction novel, the first in the Chris Godfrey of U.N.E.X.A. series by British author Hugh Walters. It was published in the UK by Faber in 1957, in the United States by Criterion Books in 1958 (under the title Blast Off at 0300), and in the Netherlands in 1960 by Prisma Juniores (under the title Ruimtevaarder nummer één -- Astronaut Number One).

The book predates the first actual usage of satellite imagery by two years, and human spaceflight by four years.

== Plot summary ==
Strange objects have been sighted on the Moon near Mons Pico. Suspecting a communist plot, the British Government quickly formulates a plan to photograph the dome-like objects from above at a closer range. However, the rocket is not large enough to send a man. Chris Godfrey, a 17-year-old science whiz with an interest in rocketry, who is less than 5 feet tall, is selected to assist. The launch site is Woomera Rocket Research Station in South Australia, but there may be a Soviet traitor among the ground crew.

== Reception ==
Floyd C. Gale of Galaxy Science Fiction rated the book five stars out of five for children, stating that it "includes plenty of action and international intrigue. Plausible and detailed, it is a juvenile Prelude to Space".
