= Expedition Venus =

1962 novel by Hugh Walters

- First edition
- Author: Hugh Walters
- Cover artist: Leslie Wood
- Language: English
- Series: Chris Godfrey of U.N.E.X.A
- Genre: Science fiction novel
- Publisher: Faber
- Publication date: 1962
- Publication place: United Kingdom
- Media type: Print (Hardback)
- Pages: 160
- Dewey Decimal: 823.91
- Preceded by: Moon Base One
- Followed by: Destination Mars

Expedition Venus is a juvenile science fiction novel, the fifth in Hugh Walters' Chris Godfrey of U.N.E.X.A. series. It was published in the UK by Faber in 1962 and in the US by Criterion Books in 1963.

== Plot summary ==
A probe returning from Venus crashes in the African desert; a Venusian spore on board thrives in its new environment; a grey mould quickly spreading and killing all it touches. An urgent crewed mission to Venus is launched from Lunaville, the now permanent Moon base. Chris Godfrey, Morrey Kant, Serge Smyslov, Tony Hale and Pierre, a scientist, are sent to try and discover what limits the mould's growth in its natural environment. The plan is to collect samples from the Venusian atmosphere but in the end a forced landing on Venus is required.
