= Spaceship to Saturn =

1967 novel by Hugh Walters

- First edition cover showing Tony dangling on the end of the safety line 61,000 miles from Saturn
- Author: Hugh Walters
- Cover artist: Leslie Wood
- Language: English
- Series: Chris Godfrey of U.N.E.X.A
- Genre: Science fiction novel
- Publisher: Faber
- Publication date: 1967
- Publication place: United Kingdom
- Media type: Print (Hardback)
- Pages: 160
- Preceded by: Mission to Mercury
- Followed by: The Mohole Mystery

Spaceship to Saturn is a juvenile science fiction novel, the tenth in British writer Hugh Walters' "Chris Godfrey of U.N.E.X.A." series. It was published in 1967 in the UK by Faber and in the US by Criterion Books and in Portugal under the title Voo para Saturno by Edições Dêagã in 1975.

== Plot summary ==
The length of the trip to Saturn means that the crew will undergo 'hypothermia' for the duration of the flight, however a massive increase in meteor activity around Saturn threatens to cancel the mission as the computer on Earth will be unable to manoeuvre the craft at such long distances to avoid collisions. The solution - instantaneous telepathy; twins Gill and Gail maintain a telepathic carrier-wave even under hypothermia which can be modulated to carry telemetry. A landing is attempted on Titan but problems arise requiring the ship to be flown through the Cassini division, a narrow gap in the rings of Saturn...
