= Journey to Jupiter =

1965 novel by Hugh Walters

- First edition
- Author: Hugh Walters
- Cover artist: Leslie Wood
- Language: English
- Series: Chris Godfrey of U.N.E.X.A
- Genre: Science fiction novel
- Publisher: Faber
- Publication date: 1965
- Publication place: United Kingdom
- Media type: Print (Hardback)
- Pages: 159
- Preceded by: Terror by Satellite
- Followed by: Mission to Mercury

Journey to Jupiter is a juvenile science fiction novel, the eighth in Hugh Walters' Chris Godfrey of U.N.E.X.A. series. It was published in the UK by Faber in 1965 and in the US by Criterion Books in 1966.

== Plot summary ==
The first crewed expedition to Jupiter reaches speeds never experienced before; despite this it takes several months to reach its objective, leading to tensions among the crew, as well as serious vision problems caused by "light slip". A miscalculation in the gravity of Jupiter means that they will not be able to stop in time and will crash into the giant planet. A diversion to the jagged Io offers their only chance of survival.
