= Tony Hale, Space Detective =

1973 novel by Hugh Walters

- First edition
- Author: Hugh Walters
- Cover artist: David Knight
- Language: English
- Series: Chris Godfrey of U.N.E.X.A
- Genre: Science fiction novel
- Publisher: Faber
- Publication date: 1973
- Publication place: United Kingdom
- Media type: Print (Hardback)
- Pages: 154
- ISBN: 0-571-10271-9
- OCLC: 715042
- Dewey Decimal: 823.914
- Preceded by: Passage to Pluto
- Followed by: Murder on Mars

Tony Hale, Space Detective is a juvenile science fiction novel, the fifteenth in Hugh Walters' Chris Godfrey of U.N.E.X.A. series. It was published in the UK by Faber in 1973.

This and all subsequent books in the series focused on either Earth or local planetary adventures, as technology to explore further afield could not be justified by Walters.

Tony Hale was first introduced as a character in Moon Base One, and this is the only book to bear one of the main characters in the title. Copies are rare and fetch high prices.

== Plot summary ==
A series of unexplained disappearances from Lunar City leads to the assignment of Morrey Kant, Serge Smyslov and Tony Hale to investigate. Without any leads, Tony Hale devises a bold solo plan and is himself kidnapped.
