= Hugh Walters =

Hugh Walters may refer to:

- Hugh Walters (actor) (1939–2015), British actor
- Hugh Walters (writer) (1910–1993), British writer of juvenile science fiction novels
