= The Mohole Mystery =

1968 novel by Hugh Walters

- First edition
- Author: Hugh Walters
- Cover artist: Leslie Wood
- Language: English
- Series: Chris Godfrey of U.N.E.X.A
- Genre: Science fiction novel
- Publisher: Faber
- Publication date: 1968
- Publication place: United Kingdom
- Media type: Print (Hardback)
- Pages: 185
- Preceded by: Spaceship to Saturn
- Followed by: Nearly Neptune

The Mohole Mystery is a juvenile science fiction novel, the eleventh in Hugh Walters' Chris Godfrey of U.N.E.X.A. series. It was published in the UK by Faber in 1968, in the US by Criterion Books in 1969 under the title The Mohole Menace. It was also published in French as Pionniers des ténèbres, (literally "Pioneers of Darkness") by Éditions de l'Amitié in 1973 and as A ameaça de Mohole in Portuguese by Edições Dêagã.

== Plot summary ==
A drilling project in Dudley in the West Midlands region of the United Kingdom hits a cavern 20 miles beneath the surface of the Earth and detects strange microbes. UNEXA send Russian Serge Smylov down to search for other forms of life in a rocket-propelled capsule but it is damaged when it hits the bottom of the cavern.

The book, under its US title The Mohole Menace, is mentioned in A Short History of Nearly Everything by Bill Bryson.

== Project Mohole ==
The real Project Mohole was an American project to sink a bore-hole through 15,000 ft of the Earth's crust into the Mohorovičić discontinuity or "Moho". The project came to be called the "No Hole", and was discontinued by the US Congress in 1966 due to ever-rising costs and the fact that they had only managed to drill to a depth of 601 ft.
