= Passage to Pluto =

1973 novel by Hugh Walters

- First edition
- Author: Hugh Walters
- Cover artist: Leslie Wood
- Language: English
- Series: Chris Godfrey of U.N.E.X.A
- Genre: Science fiction novel
- Publisher: Faber
- Publication date: 1973
- Publication place: United Kingdom
- Media type: Print (Hardback)
- Pages: 148
- ISBN: 0-571-09908-4
- OCLC: 628891
- Dewey Decimal: 823/.9/14
- LC Class: PZ7.W1715 Pas
- Preceded by: First Contact?
- Followed by: Tony Hale, Space Detective

Passage to Pluto is a juvenile science fiction novel, the fourteenth in Hugh Walters' Chris Godfrey of U.N.E.X.A. series.

It was published in the UK by Faber in 1973, in the US by T.Nelson Books in 1975.

It was the last of the series to have a cover illustration by Leslie Wood.

== Plot summary ==
Chris Godfrey is now deputy-director of UNEXA; he sends his former crew-mates to investigate unexplained perturbations in the orbit of Pluto. They discover that not only are their fuel tanks holed, but a super-dense wandering planet dubbed "Planet X" is on course to decimate the Solar System.

This was the last of Hugh Walters' 'exploration' novels as his realistic approach could not envisage travel further afield.

== See also ==
- Nibiru cataclysm
