= Mission to Mercury =

1965 novel by Hugh Walters

- First edition
- Author: Hugh Walters
- Cover artist: Leslie Wood
- Language: English
- Series: Chris Godfrey of U.N.E.X.A
- Genre: Science fiction novel
- Publisher: Faber
- Publication date: 1965
- Publication place: United Kingdom
- Media type: Print (Hardback)
- Pages: 160
- Preceded by: Journey to Jupiter
- Followed by: Spaceship to Saturn

Mission to Mercury is a juvenile science fiction novel, the ninth in Hugh Walters' Chris Godfrey of U.N.E.X.A. series. It was published in 1965 in the UK by Faber and in the US by Criterion Books. Also published under the name Missão Mercúrio in Portugal by Galeria Panorama.

== Plot summary ==
The crewed expedition to Mercury is complicated by the fact that strong solar radiation makes communication with Earth impossible. U.N.E.X.A. decide that telepathy may be the answer. Telepathic twins Gill and Gail volunteer; one accompanying Chris Godfrey and the crew on the mission; the other remaining on Earth. As they near their objective, Gail notices increasingly disruptive personality changes in the crew caused by the radiation, their only chance of survival is to land on the 'dark' side of the planet; however the near absolute zero conditions lead to massive heat-loss. Can they be rescued before freezing to death...

In the same year this book was published, radar observations of Mercury showed that it did not have a synchronous orbit and that the same face was not always in darkness.
