= Terror by Satellite =

1964 novel by Hugh Walters

- First edition cover showing refugees fleeing in the vegetation destroyed by the mad scientist Commander Hendricks.
- Author: Hugh Walters
- Cover artist: Leslie Wood
- Language: English
- Series: Chris Godfrey of U.N.E.X.A
- Genre: Science fiction novel
- Publisher: Faber
- Publication date: 1964
- Publication place: United Kingdom
- Media type: Print (Hardback)
- Pages: 159
- Dewey Decimal: 823.91
- Preceded by: Destination Mars
- Followed by: Journey to Jupiter

Terror by Satellite is a juvenile science fiction novel, the seventh in Hugh Walters' Chris Godfrey of U.N.E.X.A. series. It was published in 1964, in the UK by Faber and in the US by Criterion Books. It was later published in Portugal by Galeria Panorama, as Pânico no satélite.

== Plot summary ==
Tony Hale, skilled engineer and amateur radio ham, smuggles a home-made transceiver on board an Earth-orbiting satellite during his tour of duty. This proves invaluable as the commander of the satellite, Hendriks, is a megalomaniac and demands to be made 'Dictator of the World'. To back up this demand, he begins destroying swathes of the Earth's surface using a radiation beam. The only secure link between the Earth and the satellite is Tony's radio.
