= The Last Disaster =

1978 novel by Hugh Walters

- Cover art of the first edition
- Author: Hugh Walters
- Language: English
- Series: Chris Godfrey of U.N.E.X.A
- Genre: Science fiction novel
- Publisher: Faber
- Publication date: 1978
- Publication place: United Kingdom
- Pages: 136
- ISBN: 057111153X
- OCLC: 872705960
- Preceded by: The Caves of Drach
- Followed by: The Blue Aura

The Last Disaster is a juvenile science fiction novel, the eighteenth in Hugh Walters' Chris Godfrey of U.N.E.X.A. series. It was published in the UK by Faber in 1978

== Plot summary ==
The Moon's orbit suddenly starts to decay for reasons unknown; discovered when a solar eclipse arrives a few minutes early. The only hope of averting imminent disaster is an experimental anti-gravity device devised by an eccentric, elderly Welsh professor, who disillusioned with mankind, refuses to help...

== Reception ==
Norman Culpan in the School Librarian stated ' Simplifications... are acceptable for ten- to twelve-year-olds, since the overall picture is valid given the premises from which the story begins' while Brian Stableford was more critical saying 'Anyone but a moron will notice immediately that this is a non-starter.' and 'Hugh Walters ..... obviously knows no better, but it is hard to explain why the editor who accepted this book is .... a manifest cretin. Perhaps they just don't care.'
