= The Dark Triangle =

1979 science fiction novel by Hugh Walters

- Cover art of the first edition
- Author: Hugh Walters
- Language: English
- Series: Chris Godfrey of U.N.E.X.A
- Genre: Science fiction novel
- Publisher: Faber
- Publication date: 1979
- Publication place: United Kingdom
- Pages: 125
- ISBN: 0571115845
- OCLC: 8882523
- Preceded by: The Blue Aura
- Followed by: The Glass Men (unpublished)

The Dark Triangle is a juvenile science fiction novel, the twentieth and last published in Hugh Walters' Chris Godfrey of U.N.E.X.A. series. It was published in the UK by Faber in 1979. One final book - The Glass Men - was written, but was never published.

A copy of the completed novel was sent to then serving prime minister Margaret Thatcher and president Ronald Reagan in 1982.

== Plot summary ==
A plane carrying both the United Kingdom Prime Minister and United States President goes missing over the Bermuda Triangle. Chris Godfrey and company investigate and are captured by strange creatures.
