= The Caves of Drach =

1977 novel by Hugh Walters

- Cover art of the first edition
- Author: Hugh Walters
- Language: English
- Series: Chris Godfrey of U.N.E.X.A
- Genre: Science fiction novel
- Publisher: Faber
- Publication date: 1977
- Publication place: United Kingdom
- Pages: 136
- ISBN: 0571110371
- OCLC: 5650610
- Preceded by: Murder on Mars
- Followed by: The Last Disaster

The Caves of Drach is a juvenile science fiction novel written by Hugh Walters and published in 1977. It is the seventeenth book in the Chris Godfrey of U.N.E.X.A. series. The book was originally published in the UK by Faber.

== Plot summary ==
A multi-billionaire's grandson gets lost in the Caves of Drach in Mallorca. The grandfather employs the team of astronauts (who are on holiday) to investigate. The expedition finds him in a huge and airy underground civilization peopled by practically immortal humanoid beings who hail from the stars and took refuge underground when a Terran Ice-age threatened. The 'Cenobians' have a utopian civilization and avoid contact with the surface to keep it that way, and yet their advanced technology could bring an end to famine and disease.
