= The Domes of Pico =

1958 novel by Hugh Walters

- First edition
- Author: Hugh Walters
- Cover artist: Leslie Wood
- Language: English
- Series: Chris Godfrey of U.N.E.X.A
- Genre: Science fiction novel
- Publisher: Faber
- Publication date: 1958
- Publication place: United Kingdom
- Media type: Print (Hardback)
- Pages: 191
- Preceded by: Blast Off at Woomera
- Followed by: Operation Columbus

The Domes of Pico is a juvenile science fiction novel, the second in Hugh Walters' Chris Godfrey of U.N.E.X.A. series. It was published in the UK by Faber in 1958, in the US by Criterion Books in 1959 under the title Menace from the Moon and in the Netherlands by Prisma Juniores as 'De Maan Valt Aan' in 1960.

== Plot summary ==
To the lunar domes previously photographed in Blast Off at Woomera and situated near Mons Pico has been added a cone emitting powerful neutron radiation which is causing havoc to the Earth's nuclear power stations. The diminutive Chris Godfrey has the job of piloting a British rocket to plant a homing beacon next to the cone to enable a strike by American rockets carrying Soviet nuclear warheads...

== Reception ==
Floyd C. Gale of Galaxy Science Fiction rated the novel four stars out of five, stating that it "is as carefully and realistically detailed as its predecessor" and "will appeal to the young reader".
