= Murder on Mars =

1975 novel by Hugh Walters

- First edition
- Author: Hugh Walters
- Cover artist: David Knight
- Language: English
- Series: Chris Godfrey of U.N.E.X.A
- Genre: Science fiction novel
- Publisher: Faber
- Publication date: 1975
- Publication place: United Kingdom
- Media type: Print (Hardback)
- Pages: 131
- ISBN: 0-571-10717-6
- OCLC: 3065278
- Dewey Decimal: 823/.9/1J
- Preceded by: Tony Hale, Space Detective
- Followed by: The Caves of Drach

Murder on Mars is a juvenile science fiction novel, the sixteenth in Hugh Walters' Chris Godfrey of U.N.E.X.A. series. It was published in the UK by Faber in 1975. It was the second in the series to focus on Tony Hale's detective work rather than Chris Godfrey.

== Plot summary ==
In a crater on Mars an engineer from Mars Base has been found dead, his spacesuit slashed. Despite having a large number of suspects to interview, Morrey Kant, Serge Smyslov and Tony Hale's questioning flushes out a prime suspect. But Tony does not believe they have the right man and hatches a dangerous plan to find the real killer.
