= Mount Pico =

Volcano in the Azores, Portugal

- Ponta do Pico
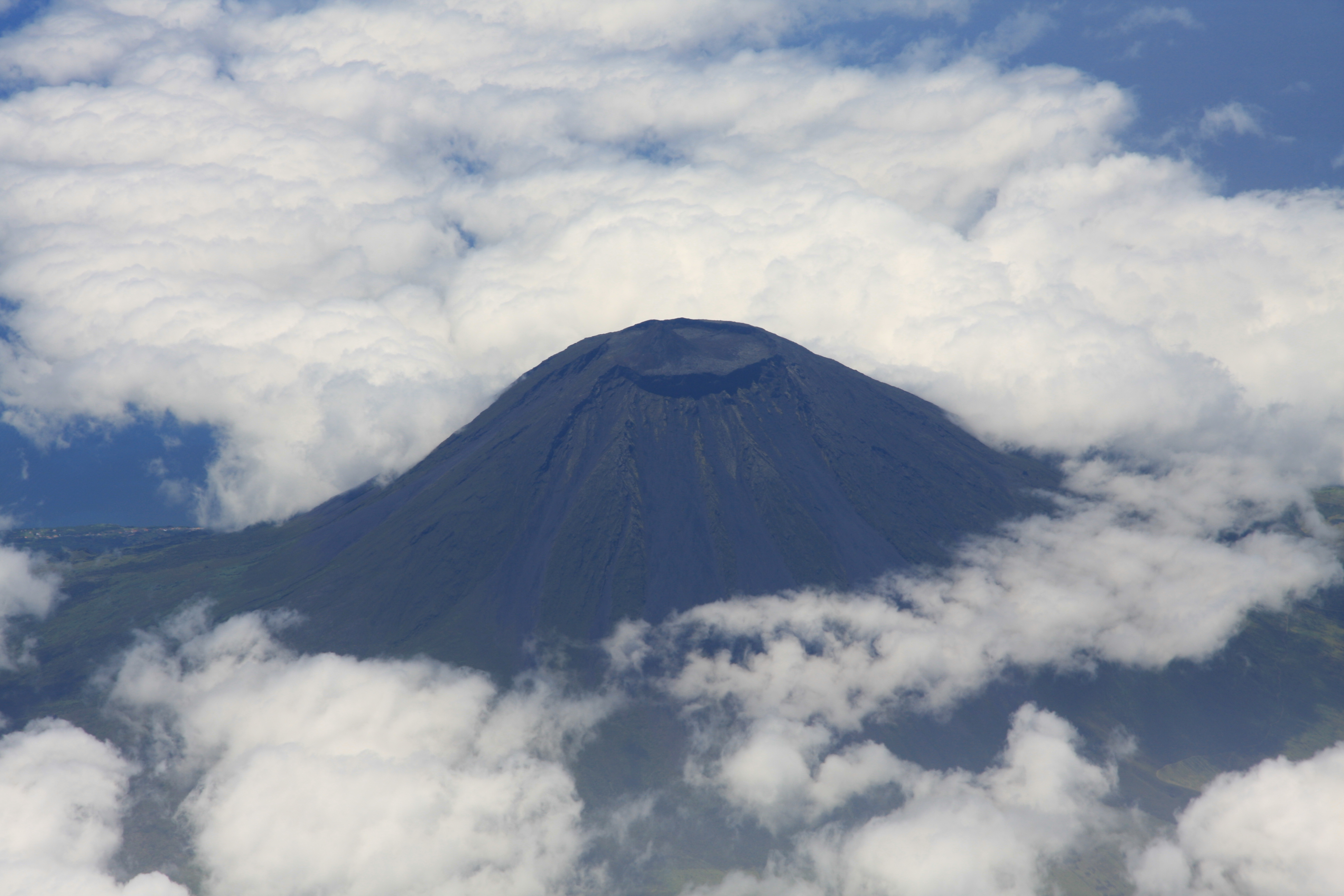
- Aerial view of Mount Pico

Highest point
- Elevation: 2,351 m (7,713 ft)
- Prominence: 2,351 m (7,713 ft)
- Parent peak: None - HP Pico
- Listing: Country high point Ultra
- Coordinates: 38°28′08″N 28°23′56″W

Geography
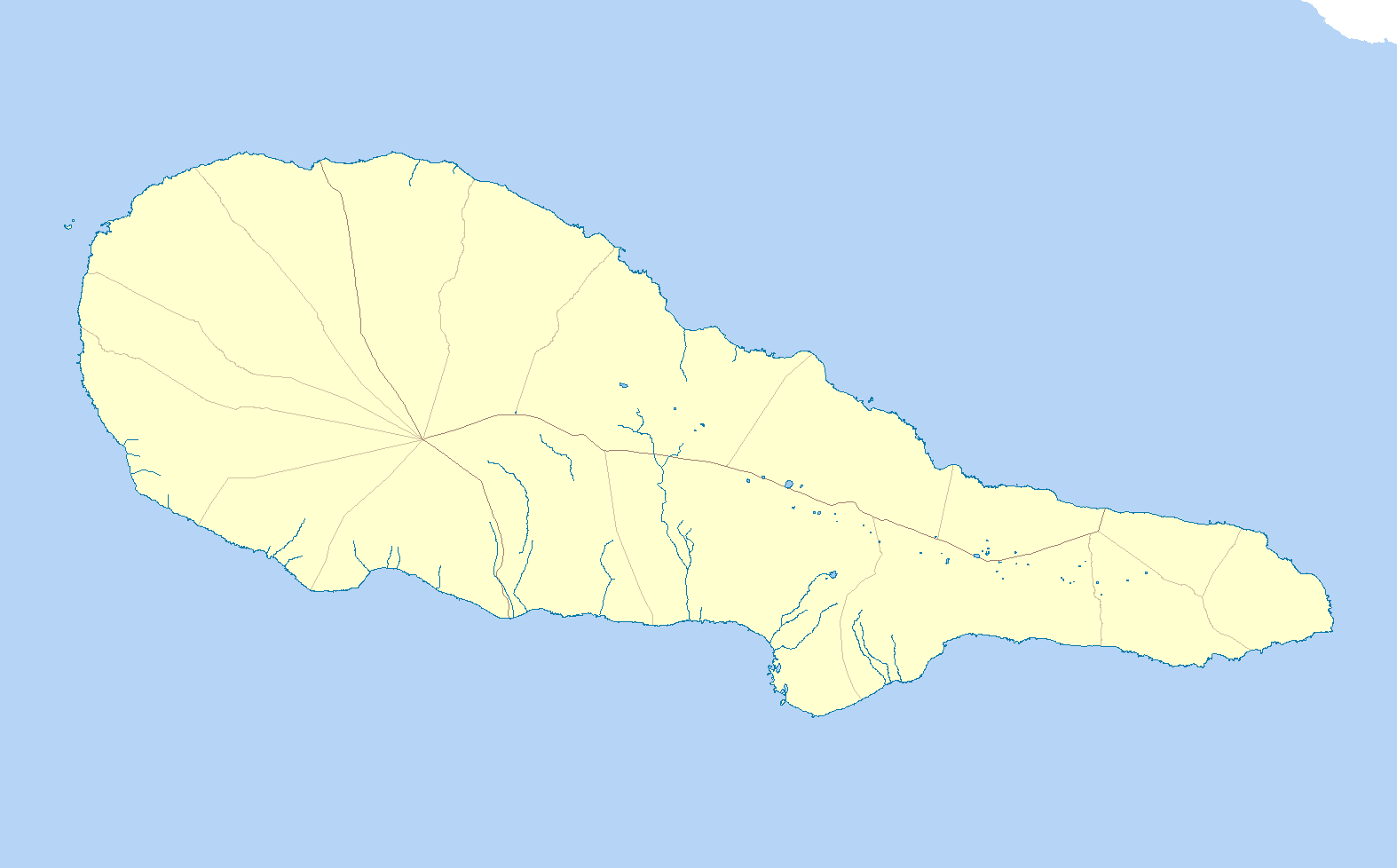
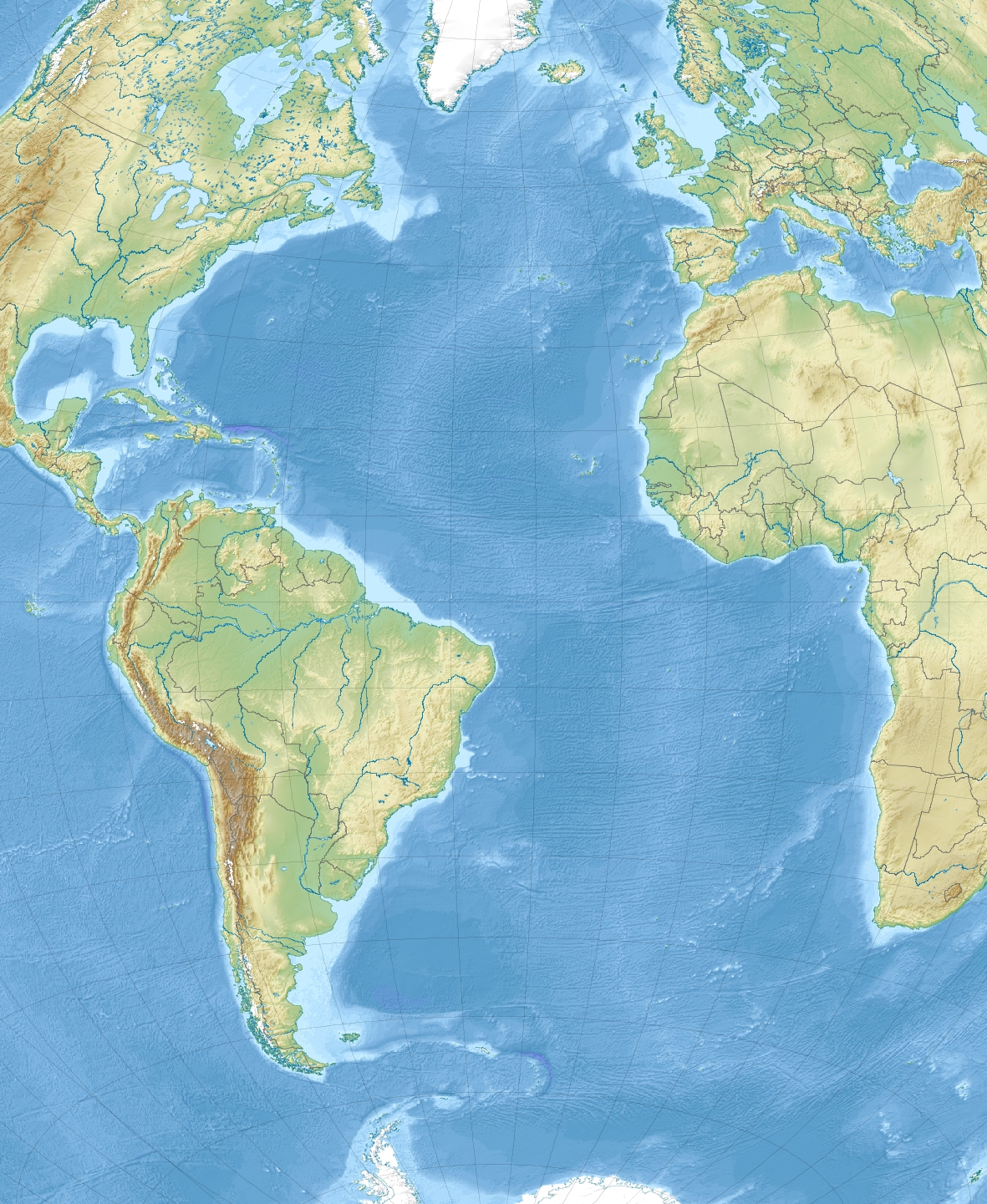
- Location within Azores Location within Pico Location within Atlantic Ocean
- Location: Pico Island, Azores
- Parent range: Mid-Atlantic Ridge

Geology
- Rock age: < 230,000 Years
- Mountain type: Stratovolcano
- Last eruption: July to December 1720

Climbing
- Easiest route: Scramble, Class 2; YDS Grade II

Mount Pico Nature Reserve
- IUCN category Ib (wilderness area)
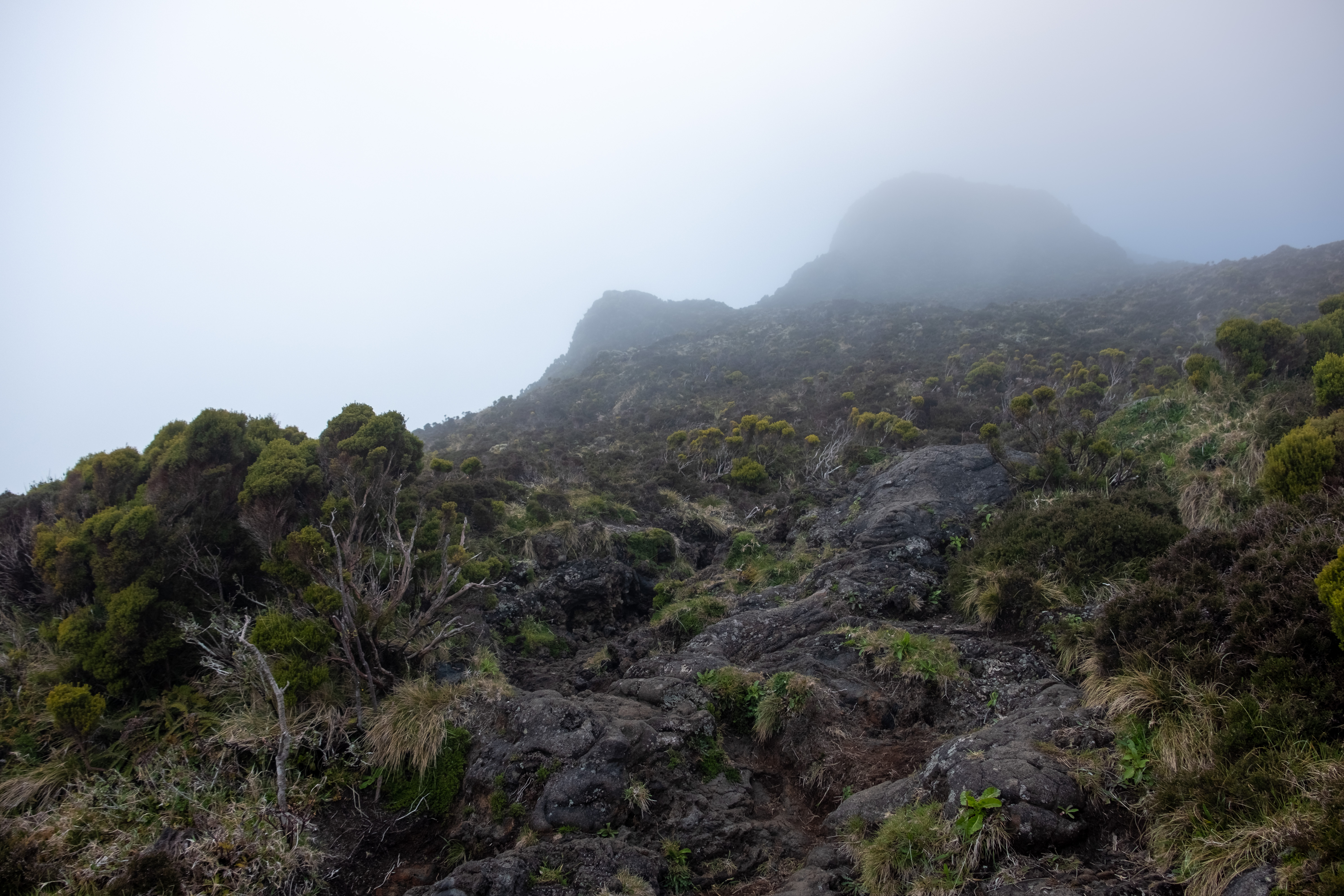
- Interactive map of Mount Pico Nature Reserve
- Area: 13.41 km^{2} (5.18 sq mi)
- Established: 1972
- Visitors: > 20,000 (in 2019)
- Governing body: ICNF

Mount Pico (Portuguese: Montanha do Pico) is a currently dormant stratovolcano located on Pico Island, in the mid-Atlantic archipelago of the Azores. It is the highest mountain in Portugal, at 2,351 metres (7,713 ft) above sea level, and is one of the highest Atlantic mountains; it is more than twice the elevation of any other peak in the Azores. It has been a designated nature reserve since 1972.

== Eruptive history ==
- Historical eruptions of Pico have occurred from vents on its flanks rather than the summit crater. In 1562–1564, an eruption on the southeast flank produced lava flows which reached the sea. Another flank eruption in 1718 also produced flows which reached the coast. The most recent eruption occurred in December 1720.
- On 29 September 2009 there were reports from local news sources that indicated that a fumarole existing at the pinnacle of the mountain (Piquinho) began emitting volcanic gas. The region's seismic and volcanological monitoring centre (Portuguese: CIVISA Centro de Informação e Vigilância Sismovulcânica dos Açores) indicated that the phenomenon occurred in the early morning, turning intense and visible in various points throughout the island and from Faial. Although the event resulted from exceptional meteorological conditions and was visible in the Central Group, there was no liberation of anomalous volcanic gases and all other parameters fell within norms.

== Geology ==
- Mount Pico volcano is part of the Madalena Volcanic Complex, one of three volcanological units that comprise the island of Pico, associated with three historic eruptions in 1562, 1718 and 1720. Current morphology suggests an age dating to the Holocene epoch, confirmed by radiocarbon dates younger than 6000 years. Structurally, this complex can be subdivided into two other sections: the Pico Volcano and the East Fissural Zone.
- Pico is a stratovolcano (or composite), with a pit crater on its summit. Pico Alto is the round crater about 500 meters (1,600 ft) in diameter and 30 meters deep that tops the volcano, with Piquinho or Pico Pequeno (both names meaning "small peak" in Portuguese), a small volcanic cone, rising 70 metres within it to form the true summit. Meanwhile, the East Fissural Zone comprises several alignments of Hawaiian/Strombolian cinder cones and associated lava flows, which overflowed many of the cliffs, cut in older units and originated lava deltas (Portuguese: fajãs).
- The tectonic structure is characterized by two fault systems. The main WNW-ESE structures are the dextral faults of Lagoa do Capitão and Topo, that merge to the east, forming a narrow shallow graben (or trench). To the west, the graben is completely covered by the Pico stratovolcano occurring less than 10,000 years ago, and infilled by lava flows and cones of the Eastern Fissural zone, that includes many of the volcanic alignments and scarps. The second fault zone, running NNW-SSE, are markedly less in number and includes normal left lateral, oblique slip faults responsible for the main volcanic eruptions: the Lomba de Fogo-São João fault (basis of the 1718 eruption) and the Santo António volcanic alignment.
- On top of Pico (at Piquinho) there is an area of permanent degasification characterized by the emission of water vapour at a temperature of between 50 °C to 75 °C. In addition, other vents also exist between 1,500 metres (4,900 ft) and 2,000 metres (6,600 ft) above sea level, as well as diffuse degasification along the graben between the Lagoa do Capitão and Topo faults. There is also a carbon dioxide-rich spring in the locality of Silveira (along the southern coast of Lajes do Pico, formed in the base of Pico.

== Observatory ==
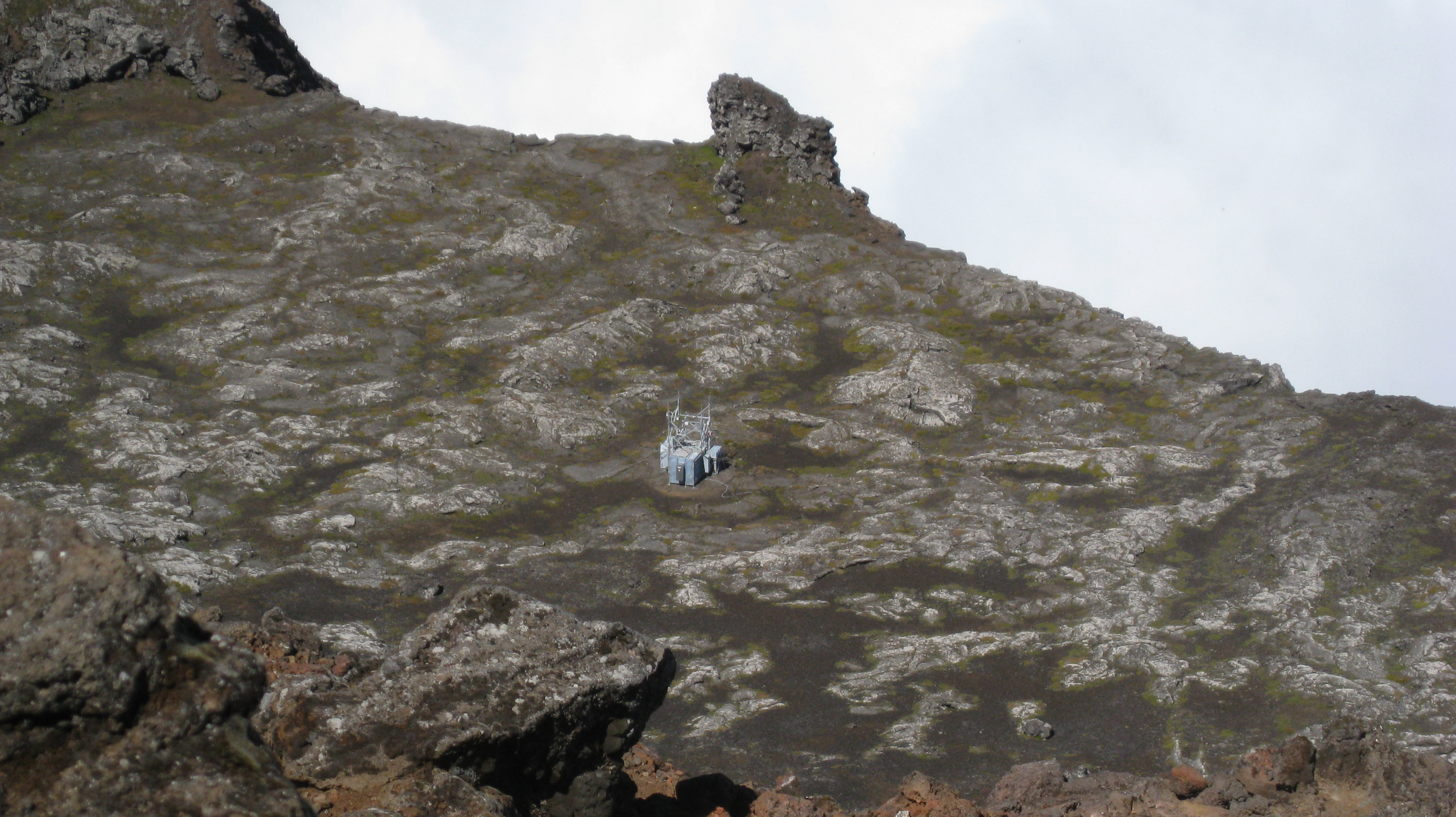
The observatory station in 2007

Mount Pico's long topographic isolation and low altitude marine boundary layer makes it an ideal place for the study of aerosol particles. In 1998, an observatory station (PICO-NARE) was placed on the summit caldera at 2,225 m (7,300 ft) altitude. The observatory was founded and is operated by the University of the Azores, with the cooperation of the Michigan Technological University, the Institute of Arctic and Alpine Research, and the University of Colorado Boulder, along with other international scientists, and is designed to study the impacts that air pollutants emitted in North America and Europe have on the atmosphere over the North Atlantic Ocean.

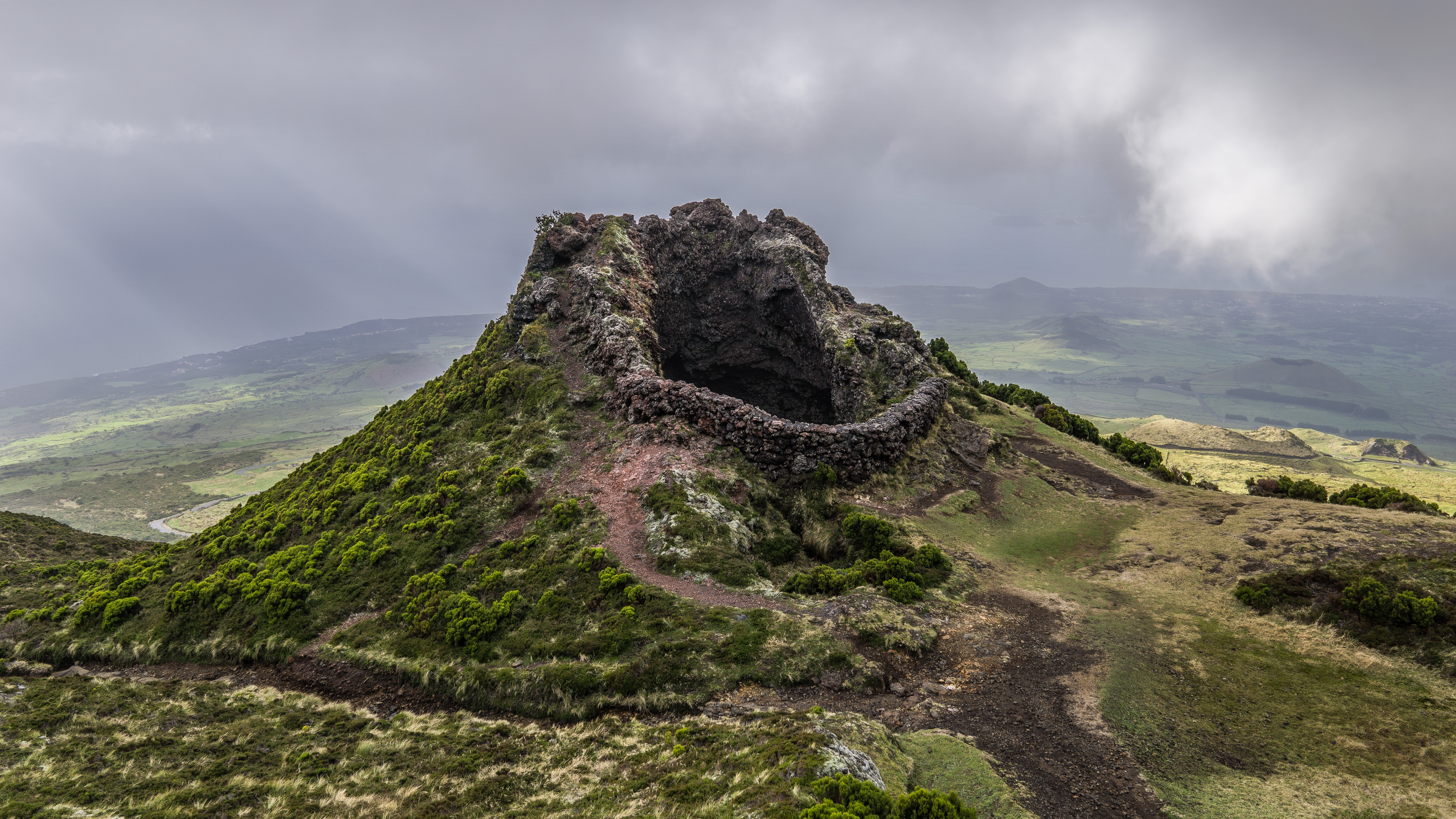
Vegetated cavern on Mount Pico

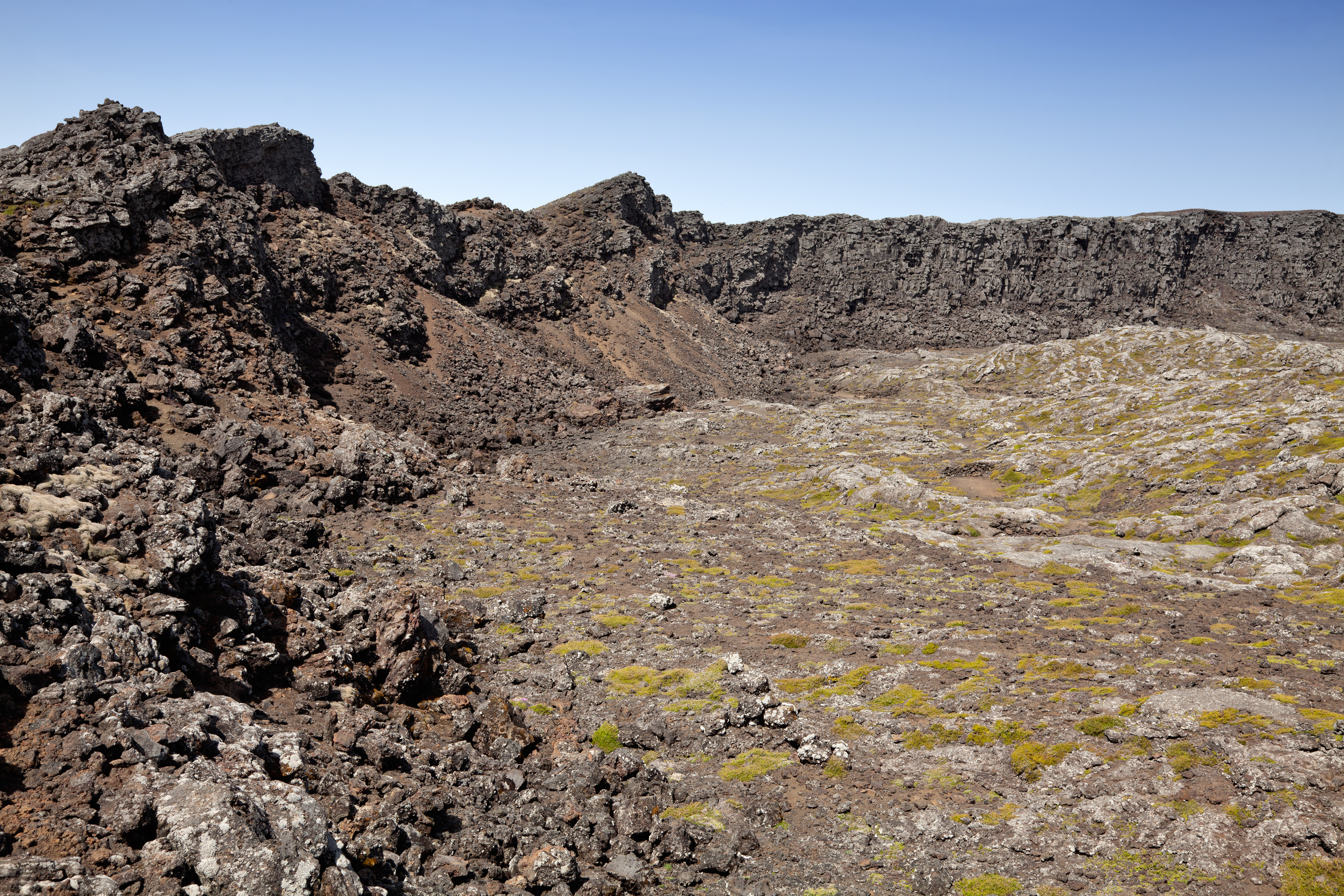
The pit crater rim of Pico Alto on the summit of Pico volcano

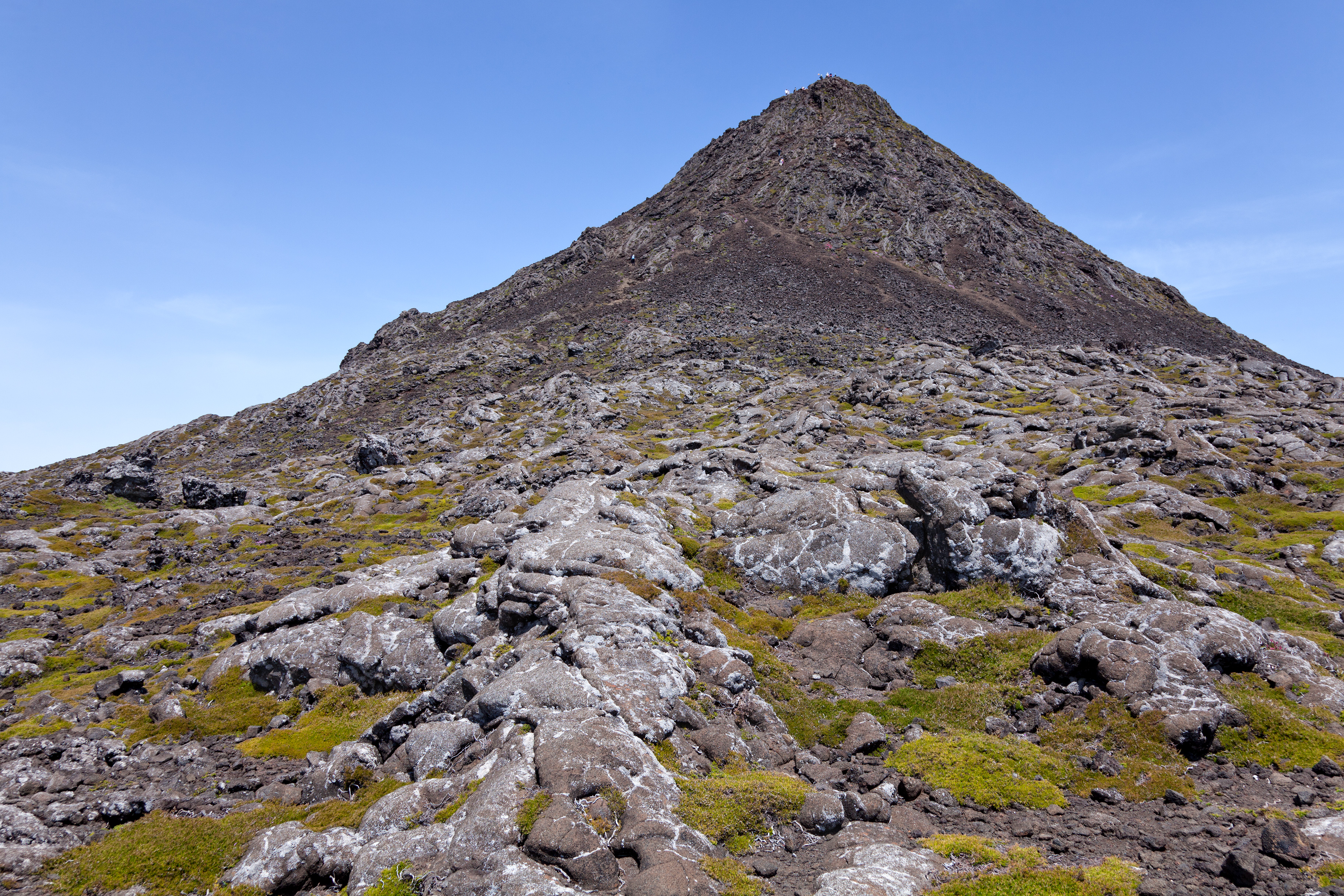
The pinnacle of the mountain: Piquinho or Pico Pequeno

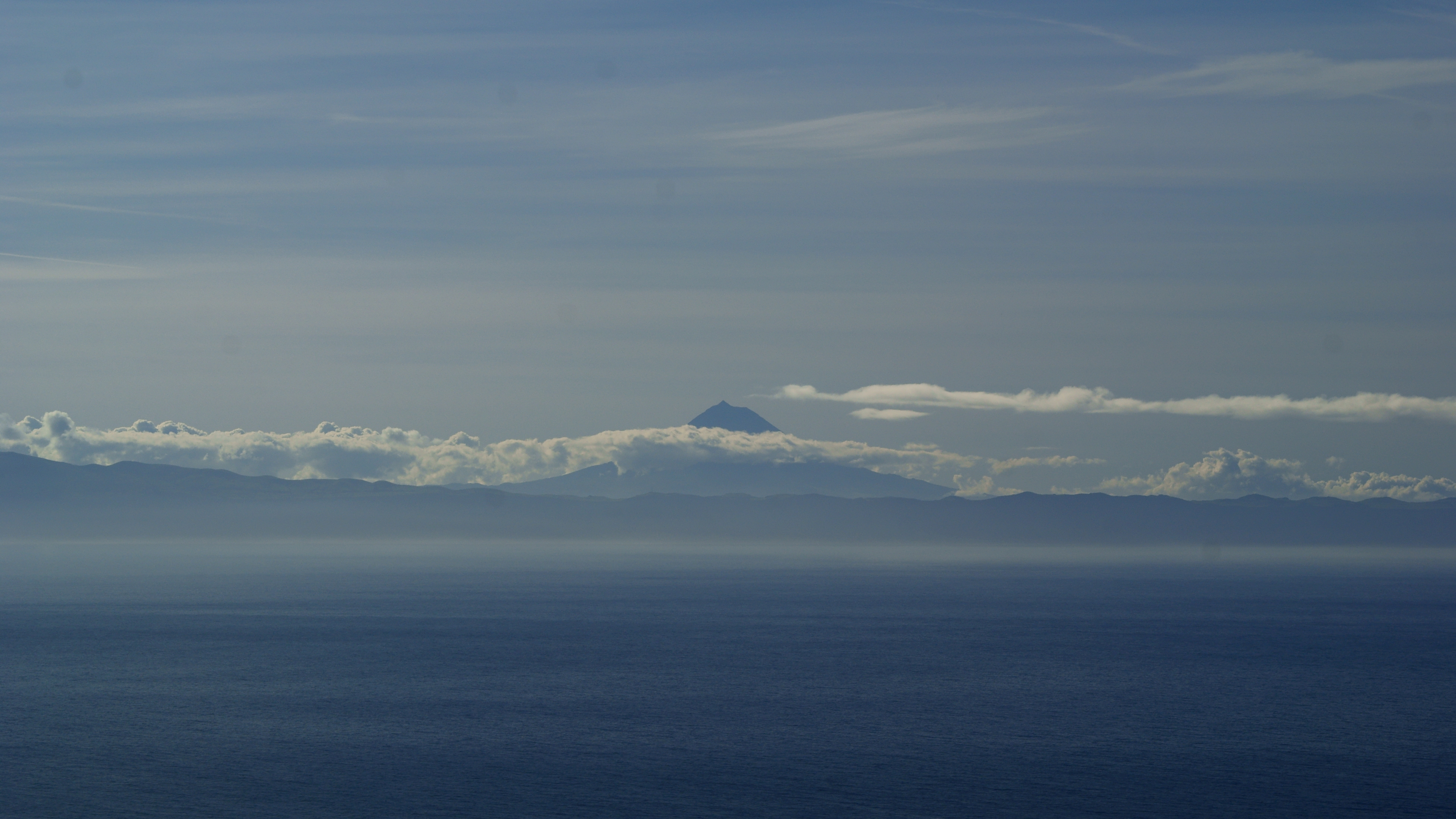
Mount Pico as it can be seen from Graciosa island (the air distance is about 70 km)

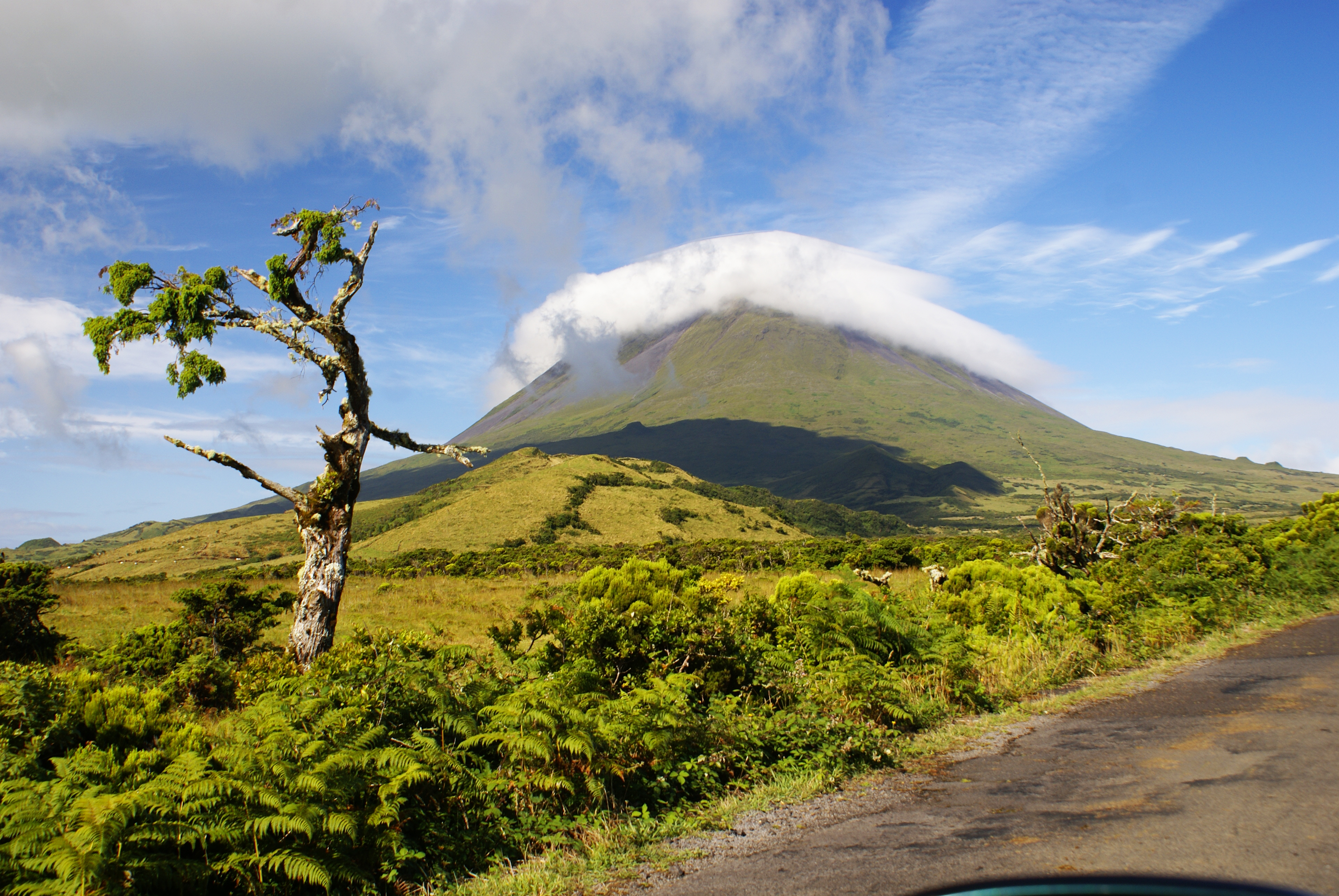
The landscape of the East Fissural Zone with some scoria cones.

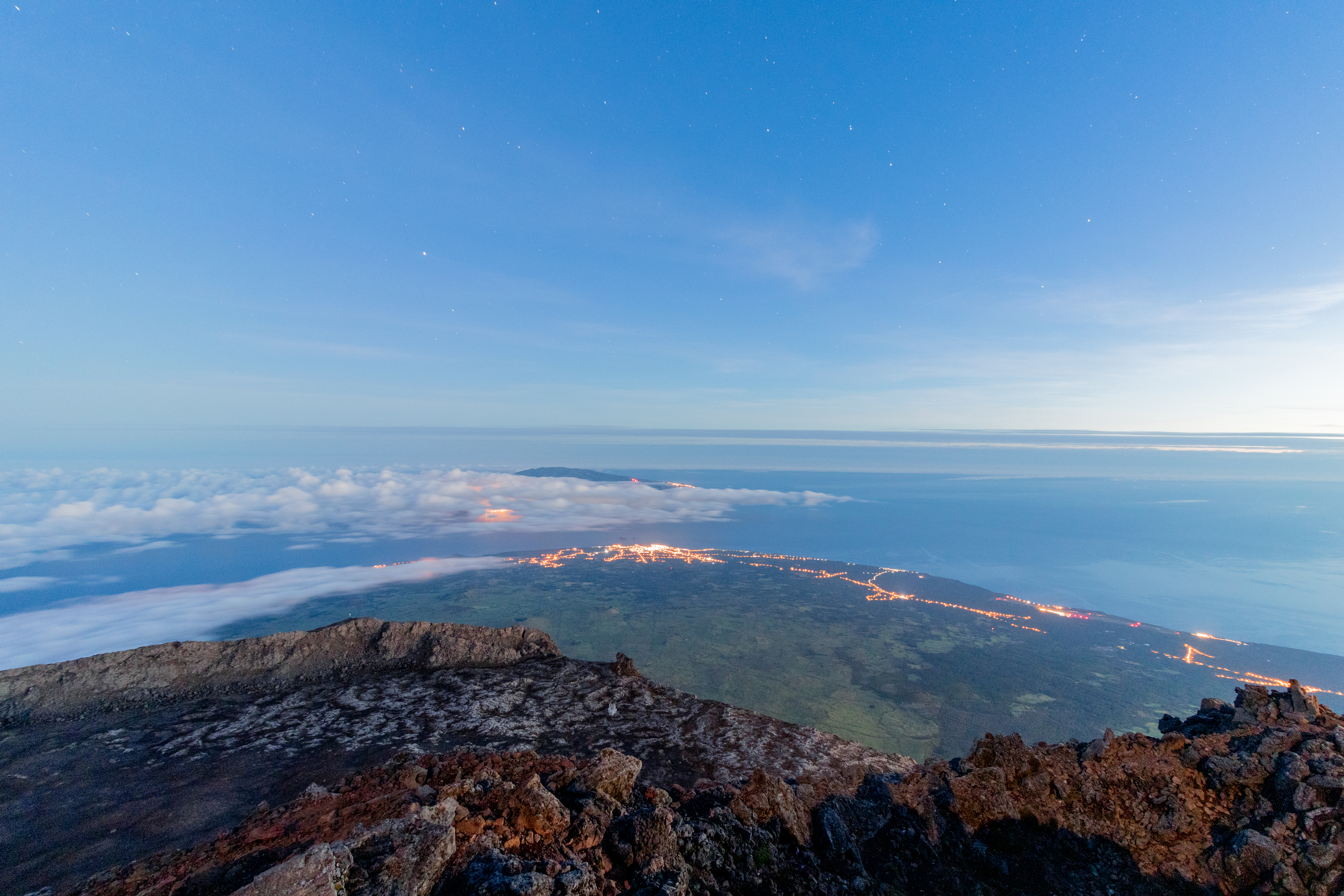
View of Madalena and Faial Island.

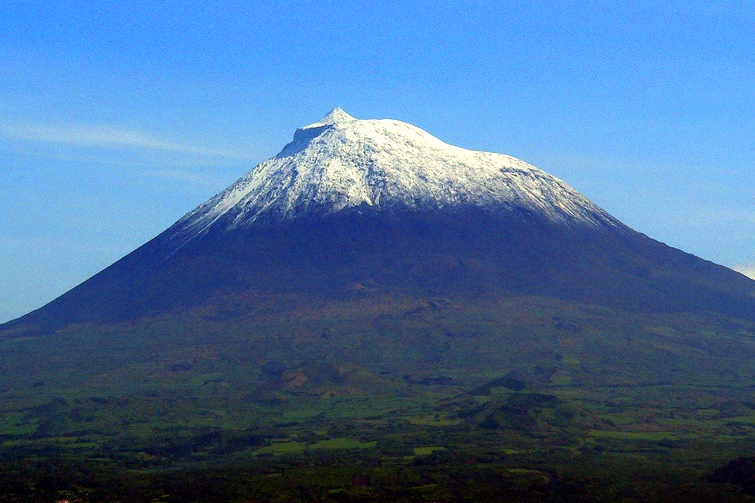
Snow on the mountain peak in early 2006.

== See also ==
- List of European ultra prominent peaks
- Mons Pico
