= Operation Columbus =

1959 novel by Hugh Walters

- First edition
- Author: Hugh Walters
- Cover artist: Leslie Wood
- Language: English
- Series: Chris Godfrey of U.N.E.X.A
- Genre: Science fiction novel
- Publisher: Faber
- Publication date: 1959
- Publication place: United Kingdom
- Media type: Print (Hardback)
- Pages: 191
- Dewey Decimal: 823.91
- Preceded by: The Domes of Pico
- Followed by: Moon Base One

Operation Columbus is a juvenile science fiction novel, the third in Hugh Walters' Chris Godfrey of U.N.E.X.A. series. It was published in the UK by Faber in 1959, in the US by Criterion Books in 1960 under the title First on the Moon, and in the Netherlands by Prisma Juniores as 'Wedloop naar de Maan' 1963.

== Plot summary ==
Both America and Russia plan crewed missions to the Moon to examine the wreckage of the structures destroyed in The Domes of Pico. The American astronaut, Morrison Kant, breaks his leg shortly before takeoff, so Chris Godfrey steps in. Both spacecraft arrive at the same time. Unlike Chris Godfrey, the Russian pilot, Serge Smyslov, is unable to leave his Lunar Rover vehicle and both head for the wrecked domes, leading to a tense standoff...

The book predates the first use of a Lunar Rover by 11 years.
