= The Blue Aura =

1979 novel by Hugh Walters

- First edition
- Author: Hugh Walters
- Publisher: Faber and Faber
- Publication date: 1979
- ISBN: 0-571-11423-7

The Blue Aura is a juvenile science fiction novel, the nineteenth in Hugh Walters' Chris Godfrey of U.N.E.X.A. series. It was published in the UK by Faber and Faber in 1979.

== Plot summary ==
A recent increase in UFO sightings on the island of Guernsey prompts the arrival of the Chris Godfrey and his friends. They meet 'The Visitors', angelic beings standing seven feet tall, but General Whittle believes the aliens are evil and plans to destroy them with a nuclear missile.
