= Hugh Walters (writer) =

British science fiction author

- Born: Walter Llewelyn Hughes; 15 June 1910; Bradley, England, United Kingdom of Great Britain and Ireland
- Died: 13 January 1993 (aged 82); Bilston, West Midlands, England, United Kingdom
- Education: Dudley Boys Grammar School
- Alma mater: City of Wolverhampton College
- Spouse: Doris Higgins
- Writing career
- Pen name: Hugh Walters
- Genre: Science fiction

Hugh Walters (15 June 1910 – 13 January 1993) was a British writer of juvenile science fiction novels from Bradley in the West Midlands region of the United Kingdom.

== Biography ==
Born Walter Llewelyn Hughes, he was educated at Dudley Grammar School and Wolverhampton College and lived most of his life in Bilston. He managed his own furniture store, Walter Hughes Ltd in Bradley and became Managing Director of Brasteds Ltd (a contraction of Bradley Bedsteads). In 1931 he married Doris Higgins; they had two children. He was a member of the British Interplanetary Society and British Astronomical Association, and became president of Bilston Rotary Club, and High Chief Ranger of the Ancient Order of Foresters. He was also a member of Bilston Tennis Club, was elected a member of Bilston Borough Council and in due course was appointed a magistrate.

== Writings ==
In 1955 he was asked to talk at Bilston Rotary Club when the scheduled speaker cancelled. He spoke about space and astronomy, and as a result was asked to speak at nearby Coseley library during Science Fiction week. In preparation he read a large number of science fiction books, was not impressed, and thought he could do better. At the age of 47 he wrote his first book using the pseudonym Hugh Walters. He later said: "As I was also a magistrate and a local councillor, I felt [that writing science fiction] left me open to ridicule. People tend to treat science fiction as a bit of a joke, so I juggled with my name and came up with Hugh Walters."

Of his writing Walters said: "I believe a good SF story should (1) entertain, (2) educate painlessly, and (3) inspire the young people of today to be the scientists and technicians of tomorrow".

His first novels mostly dealt with the exploration of other planets in the Solar System. Written for a juvenile audience, they had a scientific foundation, anticipating such advances as ion engines. Walters began writing novels concerning alien visits after all the planets had been explored.

The main characters of his novels were two British astronauts, an American, and a Russian. Their names were Chris Godfrey, Tony Hale, Morrey Kant and Serge Smyslov, respectively. Later missions used a pair of telepathic twins, Gill and Gail Patrick, for communication.

The covers of the first 14 books had illustrations by the Faber and Faber illustrator Leslie Wood.

His books are still present on the Los Angeles Science Fantasy Society recommended reading list for children and young adults.

== Bibliography ==
Hughes published 25 novels during a 40-year literary career.

Chris Godfrey of U.N.E.X.A. (United Nations Exploration Agency) series:

1. Blast Off at Woomera (1957) a.k.a. Blast Off at 0300
2. The Domes of Pico (1958) a.k.a. Menace from the Moon
3. Operation Columbus (1959) a.k.a. First on the Moon (ISBN 115120322X)
4. Moon Base One (1960) a.k.a. Outpost on the Moon ¹ (ISBN 0571061338)
5. Expedition Venus (1962) (ISBN 9780571112692)
6. Destination Mars (1963) (ISBN 0571113338)
7. Terror by Satellite (1964) (ISBN 057111492X)
8. Journey to Jupiter (1965)
9. Mission to Mercury (1965)
10. Spaceship to Saturn (1967) (ISBN 978-0-571-08137-0)
11. The Mohole Mystery (1968) a.k.a. The Mohole Menace
12. Nearly Neptune (1968) a.k.a. Neptune One is Missing
13. First Contact? (1971) (ISBN 0840763204)
14. Passage to Pluto (1973) (ISBN 084076457X)
15. Tony Hale, Space Detective (1973) (ISBN 0571102719)
16. Murder on Mars (1975) (ISBN 0571107176)
17. The Caves of Drach (1977) (ISBN 0571110371)
18. The Last Disaster (1978) (ISBN 057111153X)
19. The Blue Aura (1979) (ISBN 0571114237)
20. The Dark Triangle (1979) (ISBN 0571115845)
21. The Glass Men (unpublished)

Boy Astronaut series:

1. Boy Astronaut (1977)
2. First Family on the Moon (1979) (ISBN 0200726021) (hardback), (ISBN 020072603X) (paperback)
3. School on the Moon (1981) (ISBN 0200727435)

Other Books:

1. P-K (Psychokinesis London : Severn House, 1986. ISBN 978-0-7278-1364-0

¹ Outpost On The Moon is the US title of the USA edition, published in 1962 by Criterion Books, Inc. Its jacket included the note, "A somewhat different version of this story was published in England by Faber and Faber under the title Moon Base One."
