= Leslie Wood (illustrator) =

English artist and illustrator (1920–1994)

- Born: 26 February 1920; Stockport, England
- Died: 1994 (aged 73–74)
- Education: Manchester College of Art and Design
- Occupations: Artist and illustrator

Leslie Wood (26 February 1920 – 1994) was an English artist and illustrator who lived in Poynton, Cheshire.

Born in Stockport, England he studied at the Manchester College of Art and Design and gained a travelling scholarship. Prevented from travelling abroad because of World War II, he instead went to London. In 1943, Wood showed some of his work to Faber and Faber, and was soon commissioned to take over illustration of Diana Ross' Little Red Engine books, and went on to illustrate many other children's books including the covers of the first fourteen Hugh Walters Chris Godrey of UNEXA series.

He also produced cover illustrations for The Countryman magazine.
