= J. T. McIntosh =

Scottish journalist and author (1925–2008)

- J. T. McIntosh c.1956
- Born: James Murdoch MacGregor; 14 February 1925; Paisley, Renfrewshire, Scotland
- Died: 22 July 2008 (aged 83)
- Occupations: Author, screenwriter, journalist
- Writing career
- Pen name: H. J. Murdoch
- Language: English
- Genre: Science fiction

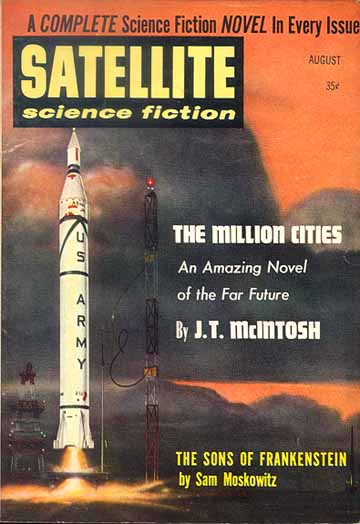
McIntosh's The Million Cities was the cover story on the August 1958 issue of Satellite Science Fiction

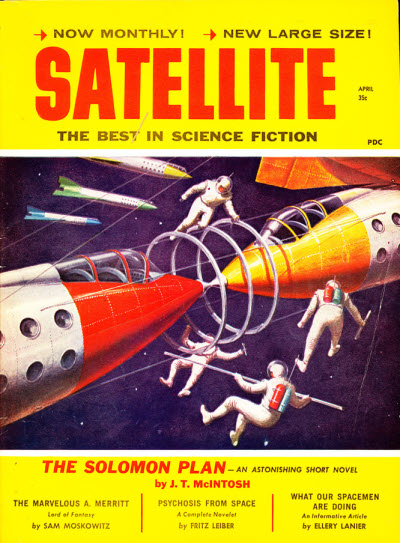
McIntosh's 1956 novella "The Solomon Plan", which was originally published in New Worlds, was reprinted as the cover story on the April 1959 issue of Satellite Science Fiction

James Murdoch MacGregor (14 February 1925 – 22 July 2008) was a Scottish journalist and author best known for writing science fiction under the pen name J.T. McIntosh.

== Biography ==
Born in Paisley, Renfrewshire, Scotland, but living largely in Aberdeen, MacGregor used the pseudonym McIntosh (along with its variants J. T. MacIntosh, and J. T. M'Intosh) as well as "H. J. Murdoch", "Gregory Francis" (with Frank H. Parnell), and "Stuart Winsor" (with Jeff Mason) for all his science fiction work, which was the majority of his literature, though he did publish books by his own name. His first story, "The Curfew Tolls", was published in the magazine Astounding Science Fiction during 1950, and his first novel, World Out of Mind, was published during 1953. He did not publish any work after 1980. He died on 22 July 2008.

Along with John Mather and Edith Dell, he is credited for the screenplay for the colour feature movie Satellite in the Sky (1956).

During 2010 the National Library of Scotland purchased his literary papers and correspondence.

== Critical reception ==
John Clute writes that "McIntosh never lost the vivid narrative skills that made him an interesting figure of 1950s sf, but his failure to challenge himself or his readers in his later career led to results that verged on mediocrity. His early work warrants revival".

== Partial bibliography ==
=== Novels ===
- World Out of Mind (Doubleday, June 1953)
- Born Leader (Doubleday, January 1954; abridged in Museum Press and Corgi editions; also as Worlds Apart, Avon, 1956)
- One in Three Hundred (Doubleday, 1954; from three novellas appeared in F&SF, 1953–1954)
- The Fittest (Doubleday, June 1955; also as The Rule of the Pagbeasts, Fawcett Crest, 1956)
- When the Ship Sank (Doubleday, June 1959, as James Murdoch Macgregor)
- Incident Over the Pacific (Doubleday, October 1960, as James Murdoch Macgregor; also as A Cry to Heaven, Heinemann, March 1961)
- Two Hundred Years to Christmas (Ace, 1961, dos-a-dos with Rebels of the Red Planet by Charles L. Fontenay)
- The Iron Rain (Heinemann, January 1962, as James Murdoch Macgregor)
- The Million Cities (Pyramid, August 1963; expanded from Satellite Science Fiction, August 1958)
- The Noman Way (Digit, June 1964; expanded from the second half of the "serial", The ESP Worlds, in New Worlds, 1952; originally submitted to the magazine as two separate stories)
- Out of Chaos (Digit, 1965)
- Time for a Change (Michael Joseph, March 1967; also as Snow White and the Giants, Avon, May 1968; from serial in If, 1966–1967)
- Six Gates from Limbo (Michael Joseph, 1968; also serialised as Six Gates to Limbo in Galaxy Science Fiction, 1969)
- Take a Pair of Private Eyes (Muller, September 1968); based on a TV play by Peter O'Donnell, first in a series
- A Coat of Blackmail (Muller, August 1970); second in a series after Take a Pair of Private Eyes
- Transmigration (Avon, December 1970)
- Flight from Rebirth (Avon, July 1971); revised and expanded from Immortality... for Some in Astounding Science Fiction, March 1960
- The Space Sorcerers (Hale, June 1972, text abridged; also as The Suiciders, Avon, November 1973, full text)
- The Cosmic Spies (Hale, November 1972) abridged as The Real People in If, December 1971. The Hale edition is abridged from the manuscript.
- Galactic Takeover Bid (Hale, June 1973)
- Ruler of the World (Laser, March 1976; censored and rewritten—without permission—version of This Is the Way the World Begins, 1977)
- This Is the Way the World Begins (Corgi, April 1977)
- Norman Conquest 2066 (Corgi, June 1977)
- A Planet Called Utopia (Zebra, August 1979)

=== Short stories and serials ===
- "The Curfew Tolls" (Astounding Science Fiction, December 1950)
- "Machine Made" (New Worlds (magazine), Summer 1951)
- "Venus Mission" (Planet Stories, July 1951)
- "Then There Were Two" (also as "One into Two"; Science Fantasy (magazine) #3, 1951)
- "Hallucination Orbit" ([vt "The Bliss of Solitude"] Galaxy Science Fiction, January 1952); adapted on the radio series X Minus One
- "Katahut Said No" (Galaxy Science Fiction, April 1952)
- "The ESP Worlds Part 1" (New Worlds (magazine), July 1952)
- "The ESP Worlds Part 2" (New Worlds (magazine), September 1952)
- "The Broken Record" (New Worlds (magazine), September 1952)
- "Stitch in Time" (Science Fantasy (magazine) #5, September 1952)
- "The ESP Worlds Part 3" (New Worlds (magazine), November 1952)
- "One in 300" (The Magazine of Fantasy and Science Fiction, February 1953) used in One in Three Hundred (1954)
- "Beggars All" (The Magazine of Fantasy and Science Fiction, April 1953)
- "Made in U.S.A." (Galaxy Science Fiction, April 1953)
- "First Lady" (Galaxy Science Fiction, June 1953)
- "Mind Alone" (Galaxy Science Fiction, August 1953)
- "One in Three Hundred" (The Magazine of Fantasy and Science Fiction (British edition), October 1953)
- "War's Great Organ" (Nebula Science Fiction, September 1953)
- "The Happier Eden" (Nebula Science Fiction, December 1953)
- "One in a Thousand" (The Magazine of Fantasy and Science Fiction, January 1954); used in One in Three Hundred (1954)
- "Men Like Mules" (Galaxy Science Fiction, February 1954)
- "Divine Right" (Nebula Science Fiction, February 1954)
- "Beggars All" (Science Fantasy (magazine) #7, March 1954)
- "Talents" (The Magazine of Fantasy and Science Fiction (British edition, March 1954)
- "Relay Race" (New Worlds (magazine) (April 1954)
- "One in a Thousand" (The Magazine of Fantasy and Science Fiction (British edition, May 1954)
- "Something New Wanted... (Guest Editorial)" (Science Fantasy (magazine) #9, July 1954)
- "One Too Many" (The Magazine of Fantasy and Science Fiction, September 1954), used in One in Three Hundred (1954)
- "Spy" (Galaxy Science Fiction, October 1954)
- "Uno su Trencento" (The Magazine of Fantasy and Science Fiction Italian edition, November 1954)
- "Play Back" (Galaxy Science Fiction, December 1954)
- "Live for Ever" (Science Fantasy (magazine) #11, December 1954)
- "Selection" (The Magazine of Fantasy and Science Fiction, January 1955)
- "Uno su Mille" (The Magazine of Fantasy and Science Fiction Italian edition, January 1955)
- "Open House" (Galaxy Science Fiction, February 1955)
- "Eleventh Commandment" (The Magazine of Fantasy and Science Fiction, May 1955)
- "The Big Hop" (Authentic Science Fiction, June 1955)
- "Bluebird World" (New Worlds (magazine), June 1955)
- "The Man Who Cried "Sheep!" (novelet)" (The Magazine of Fantasy and Science Fiction, September 1955)
- "The Lady and the Bull Pt. 1" (Authentic Science Fiction, November 1955)
- "The Lady and the Bull Pt. 2" (Authentic Science Fiction, December 1955)
- "The Solomon Plan" (New Worlds (magazine), February 1956)
- "The Deciding Factor" (Authentic Science Fiction, April 1956)
- "Safety Margin" (Authentic Science Fiction, May 1956)
- "Katahut Said No" (Authentic Science Fiction, September 1956)
- "Report on Earth" (New Worlds (magazine), September 1956)
- "Tradition" (Authentic Science Fiction, November 1956)
- "Unit" (New Worlds (magazine), February 1957)
- "The Sandmen" (The Magazine of Fantasy and Science Fiction, June 1957)
- "You Were Right, Joe" (Galaxy Science Fiction, November 1957)
- "The Million Cities" (Satellite Science Fiction, August 1958), expanded to novel, 1963
- "In Black and White" (Galaxy Science Fiction, August 1958)
- "Kingslayer" (Galaxy Magazine, April 1959)
- "Tenth Time Around" (The Magazine of Fantasy and Science Fiction, May 1959)
- "200 Years to Christmas" (Science Fantasy (magazine) #35, June 1959)
- "The Ship from Home" (Science Fantasy (magazine) #39, February 1960)
- "Immortality... for Some" (Astounding Science Fiction, March 1960), expanded to Flight from Rebirth (1971)
- "Tenth Time Round" (The Magazine of Fantasy and Science Fiction (Japanese edition), March 1960)
- "Planet on Probation" (Science Fantasy (magazine) #42, August 1960)
- "The Wrong World" (Galaxy Science Fiction, December 1960)
- "I Can Do Anything" (Galaxy Science Fiction, April 1961)
- "The Gatekeepers" (Galaxy Science Fiction, August 1961)
- "One into Two" (The Magazine of Fantasy and Science Fiction (British edition), June 1962)
- "The Stupid General" (The Magazine of Fantasy and Science Fiction, August 1962)
- "Grandmother Earth" (Galaxy Science Fiction, February 1964)
- "Humanoid Sacrifice" (The Magazine of Fantasy and Science Fiction, March 1964)
- "Poor Planet" (The Magazine of Fantasy and Science Fiction, August 1964)
- "The Man Who Killed Immortals" (Galaxy Science Fiction, February 1965)
- "The Sudden Silence" (The Magazine of Fantasy and Science Fiction, April 1966)
- "Planet of Fakers" (Galaxy Science Fiction, October 1966)
- "Snow White and the Giants Part 1" (If, October 1966)
- "Snow White and the Giants Part 2" (If, November 1966)
- "Snow White and the Giants Part 3" (If, December 1966)
- "Snow White and the Giants Part 4" (If, January 1967)
- "Six Gates to Limbo Part 1" (If, January 1969)
- "Six Gates to Limbo Part 2" (If, February 1969)
- "The Real People" (If, December 1971)
- "The World of God" (Galaxy Science Fiction, March–April 1979)
