= The Million Cities =

1958 novel by J. T. McIntosh

- Pyramid Books edition, 1963
- Author: J. T. McIntosh
- Language: English
- Genre: Science fiction
- Published: 1958
- Publication place: United Kingdom
- Media type: Print (paperback and magazine)
- Pages: 141 (paperback edition)

The Million Cities is a science fiction novel by Scottish writer J. T. McIntosh, published in August 1958 in Satellite Science Fiction in somewhat shorter form, and subsequently in full in both the US and the UK. A second edition was printed in August 1963.

== Plot summary ==
Sometime in the future when the Earth has become over-industrialized, and the entire surface has been covered with steel, it is on the verge of running out of natural resources. Nearly all of the Earth's resources have been used up; a single park in the Earth's equatorial region remains. The world's governments have built as far up and down as is possible. Billions upon billions of people live on the Earth, and the only place left to go is outer space. There is a society called Chartists that have the plans for building spaceships, and the maps of the heavens are in their sole custody. Gearing up for an all out massive development suitable an exodus, the government suddenly reverses itself, and issues an order to arrest all the Chartists, disassemble their ships and launchpads, and destroy all copies of the plans.

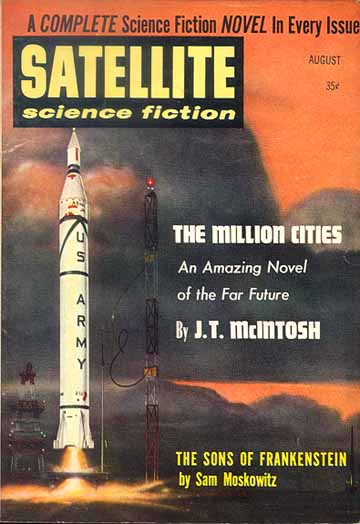
The Million Cities was the cover story on the August 1958 issue of Satellite Science Fiction
