= Cliff Temple =

British athletics journalist, author, commentator and coach

Clifford Geoffrey Temple (29 January 1947 – 8 January 1994) was a leading British athletics journalist, author, commentator and coach. For many years he was the athletics correspondent of The Sunday Times. He died by suicide after being threatened and falsely smeared.

== Early life and family ==
Temple was born in Ealing, London, the son of science fiction author William F. Temple and brother of Anne Patrizio MBE, a leading campaigner for the rights of LGBT people and their parents. He left four children Kristen, Kenza, William and Jos.

== Smear campaign ==
In 1993 Cliff Temple began an investigation into conflicts of interest in the business affairs of Fatima Whitbread, the former world record-holder in the javelin and, at the time, mistress of Andy Norman, an influential promotions officer at the British Athletic Federation (BAF). Norman threatened that if Temple did not stop asking awkward questions about Whitbread's business with the Chafford Hundred athletics club, he would spread unfounded allegations that Temple had sexually harassed a young woman athlete whom he coached. Temple carried on with his investigation and Norman carried out his threat.

In January 1994, at age 46, Temple took his own life; his body was found on the railway line at Sandling, not far from his home in Hythe, Kent.

At the inquest into Temple's death the jury were given a transcript of a recording that Temple had made of a telephone interview with Norman in which the threat was made. In their verdict they stated that the call had "pushed him over the edge".

Peter Radford, then Executive Chairman of the British Athletic Federation, said in April 1994: "So [that] there is no doubt in anyone's mind, I have never heard any evidence of any kind that Cliff Temple ever engaged in any practice which could be construed as sexual impropriety. I would have to conclude that there should be no slur whatsoever on his good name and that his good name has been cleared." Norman lost his high-profile job in British athletics soon after that.

== Publications ==
Temple's published books include:

- Nadia Comaneci 1977
- Jogging for Fitness and Pleasure 1977
- Cross Country and Road Running 1980
- Challenge of the Marathon 1981
- International Running Guide 1983
- Running Commentary (with David Moorcroft) 1984
- Running from A.to Z. 1987
- Marathon, Cross Country and Road Running 1990
- The Perfect End 1990
- Middle Distance Running: Training and Competition 1993
