= Robert Goldston =

Robert Goldston may refer to:

- Robert Conroy Goldston (1927–1982), American history writer
- Robert J. Goldston (born 1950), professor of astrophysics
