= Machine Made =

"Machine Made" is a science fiction short story by Scottish writer J. T. McIntosh, originally published in the Summer 1951 issue of New Worlds magazine. One of its author's earliest genre works, it was also his first to appear in a British publication. It was anthologized at least five times, including volumes edited by Groff Conklin and by John Carnell, and was translated into French for the 1974 volume Histoires de machines.

== Plot ==
A young woman with a stunted intellect, being the victim of brain damage from birth, is hired on to perform basic menial labor (such as janitorial services) in a facility dedicated to the operation and programming of a mainframe computer. In her free time, she is curious whether the machine can add and subtract some basic numbers when she types them in. She has checked the results when she goes home, and sometimes spends days adding and subtracting the numbers to see if the results are correct. When she is at work, she has a long day walking alone through the thousands of square feet of the facility, checking on metal casings and consoles in this facility, and dusting them as needed. She knows that typing things into the computer is forbidden for non-scientists. Therefore, she chooses her time well, and organizes her day so no one will know she is submitting questions to the computer. She sits down at a console when she knows there is nobody around, and the computer begins to recognize her style of typing. She hunts and pecks rather slowly. She has tried this four times before, and is surprised on the fifth time when the computer starts to talk to her by spooling out information in paper form.

== Reception ==
P. Schuyler Miller described "Machine Made" as "a moving anticipation of Daniel Keyes' prize-winning Flowers for Algernon. John Carnell selected the story for inclusion in "the first all-British science fiction anthology". John Boston and Damien Broderick wrote that "While ["Machine Made"] has scant relationship to any reasonable conception either of what a computer is or what mental retardation is, the readers voted it first in the issue"; Boston and Broderick compared it to the Hugo-winning They'd Rather Be Right.

== Trivia ==
- There are references to memory banks and the two basic laws of robotics: the computer must help all mankind first, and help individual humans second.
- This is an early instance in science fiction literature where a computer decides to teach someone how to fix or repair organic brain injury.
