= Man of Earth =

1958 novel by Algis Budrys

- Cover of first edition (paperback)
- Author: Algis Budrys
- Cover artist: Richard M. Powers
- Language: English
- Genre: Science fiction
- Publisher: Ballantine Books
- Publication date: 1958
- Publication place: United States
- Media type: Print (hardback & paperback)
- Pages: 144 pp

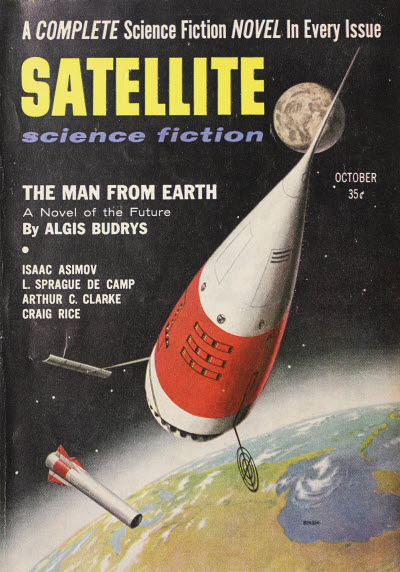
"The Man from Earth", an early version of the novel, was cover-featured on the October 1956 issue of Satellite Science Fiction.

Man of Earth is a science fiction novel by American writer Algis Budrys, first published in 1958 by Ballantine Books. "The Man from Earth", a "greatly different" earlier version of the story, was published in the debut issue of Satellite Science Fiction in 1956.

== Plot summary ==
In Man of Earth, Allen Sibley is a businessman who is about to be indicted for bribery of a public official. Desperate to escape prison, he pays a fortune to the mysterious Doncaster Corporation for a new identity (and a new body and personality to go with it). However, Doncaster tricks him, sending him as an unwilling emigrant to the extraterrestrial colony on planet Pluto. Although it has been terraformed into a pleasant enough abode, Pluto is thoroughly neglected by a narcissistic Earth, and only ne'er-do-wells and misfits settle it. Sibley, with no marketable skills, is drafted into the Plutonian army, which is building an anomalously large war machine. His new commanding persona makes him swiftly rise in rank, and he soon concludes that Pluto intends to invade and plunder its neglectful mother planet. Instead, Doncaster suddenly reveals that the Pluto colony was created by them as a stepping-stone to the stars, and that Earth will be left to go rancid, while "new men", like the rebuilt Sibley, conquer the universe.

== Literary significance and criticism ==
Galaxy reviewer Floyd C. Gale wrote that Budrys had "cut a complex tale from simple cloth." Damon Knight, although praising the opening segment as "symbolically powerful, and beautifully managed," found that as the story progresses, it "first loses its special flavor, and then becomes a different story altogether."

== Sources ==
- Budrys, Algis (1958). Man of Earth (1st ed.). Ballantine Books.
