= Nebula Science Fiction =

First Scottish science fiction magazine (1952–1959)

The December 1956 issue of Nebula. The cover is by James Stark, whose work is described by science fiction art historian David Hardy as "severe portrayals of technology against which men were mere ants".

Nebula Science Fiction was the first Scottish science fiction magazine. It was published and edited, from 1952 to 1959, by Peter Hamilton, a young Scot who was able to take advantage of spare capacity at his parents' printing company, Crownpoint, to launch the magazine. Because Hamilton could only print Nebula when Crownpoint had no other work, the schedule was initially erratic. In 1955 he moved the printing to a Dublin-based firm, and the schedule became a little more regular, with a steady monthly run beginning in 1958 that lasted into the following year. Nebula's circulation was international, with only a quarter of the sales in the United Kingdom; this led to disaster when South Africa and Australia imposed import controls on foreign periodicals at the end of the 1950s. Excise duties imposed in the UK added to Hamilton's financial burdens, and he was rapidly forced to close the magazine. The last issue was dated June 1959.

The magazine was popular with writers, partly because Hamilton went to great lengths to encourage new writers, and partly because he paid better rates per word than much of his competition. Initially he could not compete with the American market, but he offered a bonus for the most popular story in the issue, and was eventually able to match the leading American magazines. He published the first stories of several well-known writers, including Robert Silverberg, Brian Aldiss, and Bob Shaw. Nebula was also a fan favourite: author Ken Bulmer recalled that it became "what many fans regard as the best-loved British SF magazine".

== Publishing history ==
In 1952 Peter Hamilton was 18 years old and had just left school; he was looking for a job, but was not healthy enough for hard physical work. His parents ran a printing house in Glasgow, Crownpoint Publications, and occasionally had spare capacity: they were interested in using the idle time on their machinery to enter the publishing business, and Peter persuaded them to publish paperback science fiction (sf) novels. Two novels were acquired, but when Crownpoint approached a local wholesaler to handle the distribution, they were told that paperbacks would be a mistake, and that a magazine, with a regular publication schedule, would be more likely to sell well. The result was Nebula Science Fiction. The first issue was dated Autumn 1952, and sold 4,000 copies.

	Jan	Feb	Mar	Apr	May	Jun	Jul	Aug	Sep	Oct	Nov	Dec
1952									1/1			
1953	1/2		1/3		1/4			2/1				2/2
1954		2/3		2/4				9		10		11
1955				12					13		14	
1956	15		16				17				18	19
1957			20		21		22	23	24	25		
1958	26	27	28	29	30	31	32	33	34	35	36	37
1959	38	39			40	41						
Issues of Nebula showing volume/issue number. The first four issues were dated Autumn 1952, Spring 1953, Summer 1953 and Autumn 1953; from issue 5 they were dated with the month.

Advertisements stated that Nebula was "Scotland's first S.F. magazine!!" Several British science fiction fans helped Hamilton with the production of the magazine, including Ken Slater, Vin¢ Clarke, and John Brunner. William F. Temple was involved as an editorial consultant and also assisted with editing the manuscripts. Hamilton provided all the financing, but he had to wait for the money to come in from each issue before he could afford to produce the next. In addition, Crownpoint only intermittently had enough spare capacity to print Nebula, so the first few issues appeared on an erratic schedule. After a dozen issues, the conflicts led to Hamilton moving Nebula to a printing firm based in Dublin, and breaking the connection with Crownpoint. He was then able to publish on a slightly more regular schedule, although the planned bi-monthly issues were still sometimes delayed. Hamilton paid 21 shillings (£1.05) per thousand words, the equivalent of three-tenths of a cent per word; this was a low rate compared to the American market, but was marginally better than the contemporary British magazine Authentic Science Fiction, which paid £1 per thousand words. Hamilton offered a bonus of £2 or £5 to the story that turned out to be the readers' favourite in each issue, which helped attract writers; and he later increased the rates, paying as much as 2d (0.8p, or 2.3 cents) per word for well-known authors. (Note: Ashley quotes these conversions as 21 shillings per thousand equals half a cent per word, and 2d per word equals three cents per word, but as the exchange rate at the time was $2.80 to the pound his calculations appear to be inaccurate.) This was higher than the best UK markets, such as New Worlds, and was close to the rates paid by the top magazines in the US at that time. Both the high rates of pay and Hamilton's willingness to work with new authors were designed to encourage writers to submit their work to Nebula before trying the other magazines.

Hamilton's editorial in the September 1957 issue reported a circulation of 40,000, and starting in January 1958 Nebula went on a regular monthly schedule that was maintained until early 1959. Although Nebula's circulation was strong, only about a quarter of its sales were in the UK. A further quarter of the sales were in Australia, another third in the US, and nearly a tenth in South Africa. At the end of the 1950s, first South Africa and then Australia began to limit foreign magazine imports, for economic reasons, and when this was followed by UK excise duties the magazine was quickly in debt. Hamilton was forced to cease publication with issue 41, dated June 1959. Hamilton had also had health problems which contributed to his decision to stop publication.

== Contents and reception ==
The first two issues of Nebula contained the two novels Hamilton had bought before changing his plans from a paperback series to a magazine: Robots Never Weep by E.R. James, and Thou Pasture Us by F.G. Rayer. These left little room for other material, but Hamilton was able to reprint a short story by A. E. van Vogt in the first issue, and stories by John Brunner and E. C. Tubb in the second issue, along with material by lesser known writers. There was also a column by Walt Willis called "The Electric Fan", later renamed "Fanorama", which covered science fiction fandom.

Many of the better-known British writers began to appear in Nebula, including William F. Temple and Eric Frank Russell; new authors also began to be published. Hamilton was glad to work with beginning writers, and in 1953 several writers who later became very well known, including Brian Aldiss, Barrington Bayley, and Bob Shaw, each sold their first story to Nebula. (Note: Aldiss comments that Nebula was the most exciting UK market available to him when he began to write; he found Authentic Science Fiction boring.) Not all these stories reached print that year: Aldiss's "T" appeared in the November 1956 issue, by which time other stories of Aldiss's were in print, and the first story by Bayley is not certainly identified – it may have been "Consolidation", which appeared in November 1959, but it is also possible that it was never printed. (Note: Neither Hamilton, nor Aldiss, nor Bayley could recall the details in these cases, according to sf historian Mike Ashley.) Robert Silverberg had begun submitting stories to Hamilton as soon as he heard of Nebula, realising that Hamilton was unlikely to be getting many submissions from US writers, and found Hamilton very helpful. (Note: Silverberg quotes a letter Hamilton wrote him in July 1953: "If you'd like to go on trying, I'll be only too happy to continue to advise you. If you become a big name through Nebula it will be as big a thing for me (nearly) as it will be for you.") Silverberg's first story, "Gorgon Planet", was accepted by Hamilton on 11 January 1954. (Note: "Gorgon Planet" had in fact already been accepted by Harry Harrison before Hamilton acquired it; Harrison planned to publish it in Rocket Stories or Super-Science Fiction, but both went out of print before the story appeared. Since Harrison paid on publication, not on acceptance, Hamilton's acquisition of "Gorgon Planet" represented Silverberg's first sale. Silverberg records that he was paid $12.60 for the story by Hamilton.) Brian Aldiss echoes Silverberg's assessment of Hamilton, commenting that Hamilton was "a sympathetic editor to a beginner. He was also a patient editor."

Other authors who appeared in Nebula early in their careers included Harlan Ellison, John Rackham, and James White. Science fiction historian Mike Ashley regards the stories Hamilton selected as demonstrating a "wide range of material by excellent writers" that was "seldom predictable", but adds that the stories have become dated, with the result that few are now well-known. Among a short list of exceptions Ashley includes Brian Aldiss's "Legends of Smith's Burst" and "Dumb Show". Because of the erratic schedule, Hamilton only serialised one novel: Wisdom of the Gods, by Ken Bulmer, which appeared in four parts, starting in the July 1958 issue. Hamilton was planning to serialise a novel by Robert Heinlein when the magazine ceased publication.

Cover art came from artists such as Gerard Quinn, and included some of Eddie Jones' earliest work. According to sf historian Philip Harbottle, the best of the Scottish artists that Hamilton worked with was James Stark, who painted nine covers for Nebula between 1956 and 1958; sf artist and art historian David Hardy describes Stark's work as "severe portrayals of technology against which men were mere ants". Interior artists included Harry Turner, whose work is described by Harbottle as "visually striking" and "semi-impressionistic". From the October 1954 issue the back cover was given over to black and white artwork, often drawn by Arthur Thomson. Author Ken Bulmer regards these back covers as having given the magazine a "tremendously individual flavor".

Nebula became an established part of the British science fiction scene in the 1950s. The magazine was well-liked by writers, and Bulmer recalls that, overall, Nebula "created a special kind of charisma that, in the view of many writers and readers, no other magazine ever had", and adds that it became "what many fans regard as the best-loved British SF magazine". Tubb, who sold many popular stories to Hamilton, comments that "Authors wrote for Nebula with financial reward taking secondary place; the desire of submitting a good story being of primary importance ... the writers and the contributors felt as if Nebula was 'their' magazine, and all that became a happy, well-integrated family."

== Bibliographic details ==
The publisher was Crownpoint Publications for the first twelve issues, though the name was dropped from the indicia starting with the December 1953 issue. From September 1955 the publisher was Peter Hamilton, who was editor throughout. The price was 2/- (10p) for all but the last two issues, which were priced at 2/6 (12.5p).

Nebula was printed in large digest format, 8.5 by 5.5 inches (220 mm × 140 mm). The first three issues were 120 pages; this increased to 128 pages for the next three issues, to 130 pages for issue 7, and to 136 pages for issue 8. Issues 9 through 12 were 128 pages, and the remaining issues were 112 pages. The issues were numbered consecutively throughout; the first eight issues were given volume numberings as well, with two volumes of four numbers each.

Issues 30 through 39 of Nebula were distributed in the US; they were stamped at 35 cents and post-dated four months, thus the American copies ran from September 1958 to June 1959.

== Sources ==
- Aldiss, Brian; Harrison, Harry (1976). Hell's Cartographers. London: Orbit. ISBN 0-86007-907-4.
- Ashley, Michael (1976). The History of the Science Fiction Magazine Vol. 3 1946–1955. Chicago: Contemporary Books, Inc. ISBN 0-8092-7842-1.
- Ashley, Michael (1978). The History of the Science Fiction Magazine Part 4 1956–1965. London: New English Library. ISBN 0-450-03438-0.
- Ashley, Mike (2005). Transformations: The Story of the Science Fiction Magazines from 1950 to 1970. Liverpool: Liverpool University Press. ISBN 0-85323-779-4.
- Bounds, Sydney J. (2003). The Best of Sydney J. Bounds, Volume 1: Strange Portrait and Other Stories. Rockville, MD: Wildside Press. ISBN 1-58715-516-8.
- Clute, John (1995). Science Fiction: The Illustrated Encyclopedia. New York: Dorling Kindersley. ISBN 0-7894-0185-1.
- Clute, John; Nicholls, Peter (1993). The Encyclopedia of Science Fiction. New York: St Martin's Press. ISBN 0-312-09618-6.
- Harbottle, Philip (2008). Fantasy Adventures 13. Rockville, MD: Wildside Press. ISBN 978-0-8095-6292-3.
- Harbottle, Philip; Holland, Stephen (1992). Vultures of the Void. San Bernardino, CA: Borgo Press. ISBN 0-89370-415-6.
- Holdstock, Robert, ed. (1978). Encyclopedia of Science Fiction. London: Octopus Books. ISBN 0-7064-0756-3.
- Silverberg, Robert (2004). Phases of the Moon. New York: ibooks. ISBN 0-7434-9801-1.
- Tuck, Donald H. (1982). The Encyclopedia of Science Fiction and Fantasy: Volume 3. Chicago: Advent Publishers. ISBN 0-911682-26-0.
- Tymn, Marshall B.; Ashley, Mike (1988). Science Fiction, Fantasy and Weird Fiction Magazines. Westport, CT: Greenwood Press. ISBN 0-313-24349-2.
- Weinberg, Robert (1985). A Biographical Dictionary of Science Fiction and Fantasy Artists. Westport, CT: Greenwood Press. ISBN 0-313-21221-X.
