= William F. Temple =

British science fiction writer

William Frederick Temple
- Born: 9 March 1914; Woolwich, United Kingdom
- Died: 15 July 1989 (aged 75); Folkestone, United Kingdom
- Children: Cliff Temple; Anne Patrizio
- Writing career
- Pen name: Temple Williams
- Period: 1935–1970
- Genres: Science fiction, Horror fiction
- Notable work: Four Sided Triangle

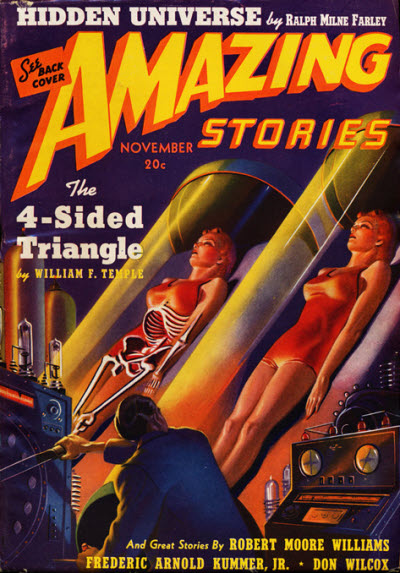
Temple's novelette The Four Sided Triangle, later expanded to a novel and adapted as a feature film, was the cover story of the November 1939 issue of Amazing Stories

William Frederick Temple (9 March 1914 – 15 July 1989) was a British science fiction writer, best known for authoring the novel-turned-film Four Sided Triangle.

== Early life and career ==
Temple was born in Woolwich in 1914. In 1930, he became a clerk in the London Stock Exchange. His interest in science fiction and space exploration led him to become an active member of both the Science Fiction Association and the British Interplanetary Society: in the former organisation, he was chair of the Writer's Circle and on the editorial team of Novae Terrae while at the latter was he editor of their journal Bulletin. Prior to World War II, Temple shared a flat in London with fellow science fiction fans Arthur C. Clarke and Maurice K. Hanson. Temple wrote a gently humorous, semi-autobiographical account of this time, called Bachelor Flat, in the 1940s but failed to find a publisher. It was eventually printed in the collection 88 Gray's Inn Road: A Living-Space Odyssey (2000). Alongside his involvement with science fiction fandom, Temple began to sell stories to a number of venues including Tales of Wonder. His first published science fiction work was the SF-horror short story "The Kosso", published in the anthology Thrills (1935). He went on to publish other works in amateur and professional magazines over the next few years.

Temple married his girlfriend Joan in September 1939: their relationship inspired Temple's most famous story, Four-Sided Triangle, the first version of which appeared in the November 1939 issue of Amazing Stories as "The 4-Sided Triangle". In September 1940 he was conscripted and served as a field artillery signaller while Joan and their daughter Anne Patrizio were evacuated to Cornwall. While serving in the North African Campaign, Temple began work on a novel-length Four-Sided Triangle but lost the half-finished manuscript during a battle in the Tunisian Campaign at Takrouna. He subsequently participated in the Allied invasion of Sicily in July 1943, during which he learned of the birth of his son Peter and the subsequent invasion of Italy, where he lost a second manuscript of Four-Sided Triangle during the Battle of Anzio. During his time in Italy, he received the tragic news that his son had died of a viral infection aged just seven months. He resumed work on Four-Sided Triangle while on leave in Rome and completed it in the Alps: on his return home in October 1945 he typed the novel and began to submit it to publishers, after four rejections it was accepted by John Long and published in July 1949 to positive reviews. A film version of Four Sided Triangle directed by Terence Fisher was released in 1953. His son Cliff Temple was born in 1947.

== Later work ==
In the early- and mid-1950s Temple was a full-time writer who regularly sold to magazines but found less success with novels, though he did sell the Martin Magnus series for young readers and a non-fiction book on space travel. However, in spite of being voted "Author of the Year" for 1957 by the reader of Nebula Science Fiction the income from these markets was not sufficient to support his family so he returned to full-time employment in 1957. In the early 1960s he expanded three earlier short stories into short novels for the American Ace Doubles line: The Encyclopedia of Science Fiction refers to these books as "undistinguished".

In the mid-1960s, Temple attempted to respond to New Wave science fiction with a pair of more ambitious novels. Shoot at the Moon is a parodic story about a British Moon landing with a murder mystery plotline, however, though the book was praised in SF markets by Hilary Bailey and Judith Merril his American publisher Simon & Schuster was deterred from pursuing the planned promotion and film option with ABC by a negative New York Times review. His next and last novel, The Fleshpots of Sansato (1968) was issued in a poorly-edited edition by New English Library, leading Temple to halt his writing career. Temple later considered a novel about faith healing but ceased work on it after his agent said there was no market. He died in 1989.

Temple's son, Cliff Temple, was a leading UK athletics journalist, writer, commentator, and coach; and his daughter, Anne Patrizio MBE is well known in the UK as a campaigner for the rights of LGBT people and their parents.

== Works ==
His best-known work might be the novel which formed the basis for the film Four Sided Triangle, a 1949 novel which Groff Conklin called "brilliantly charactered and humanly real". P. Schuyler Miller praised its "warmly believable characters." Four-Sided Triangle and Shoot at the Moon were reissued in 2018 by the British Library.

Temple also wrote space opera, such as his last novel The Fleshpots of Sansato (1968).

His science fiction novels include the Martin Magnus trilogy, published in hardcover by Frederick Muller Ltd: Martin Magnus, Planet Rover (1954), Martin Magnus on Venus (1955), and Martin Magnus on Mars (1956). The first two of these were re-printed in paperback in 1970 by Mayfair Books Ltd.

== Bibliography ==
=== Short stories ===
- Lunar Lilliput (1937), Tales of Wonder
- The Smile of the Sphinx (1937), Tales of Wonder
- The Four Sided Triangle (1939), Amazing Stories
- The Year Dot (1969), If

=== Novels ===
- Four-Sided Triangle (1949)
- Martin Magnus, Planet Rover (1954)
- Martin Magnus on Venus (1955)
- Martin Magnus on Mars (1956)
- The Automated Goliath (1962)
- The Three Suns of Amara (1962)
- Battle on Venus (1963)
- Shoot at the Moon (1966)
- The Fleshpots of Sansato (1968)

== Collections ==
- 88 Gray's Inn Road (2000)
- A Niche in Time and Other Stories (2011)

== Non-fiction ==
- The True Book About Space Travel (1954)
