= One in Three Hundred =

1953 novel by J. T. McIntosh

- First edition
- Author: J. T. McIntosh
- Cover artist: Mel Hunter
- Language: English
- Genre: Science fiction
- Publisher: Doubleday
- Publication date: 1953
- Publication place: UK
- Media type: Hardback, Paperback

One in Three Hundred is a science fiction novel by British writer J. T. McIntosh. It was originally published as three novellas in The Magazine of Fantasy and Science Fiction in 1953-54, and was then published by Doubleday & Company, Inc. During 1956 the novel was reissued by Ace as Ace Double D-113, in a dos-à-dos binding with Dwight V. Swain's The Transposed Man.

The original novellas were "One in 300" (February 1953), "One in a Thousand" (January 1954), and "One Too Many" (September 1954). The first novella was included in the anthology Best SF of 1954.

== Plot ==
Set in the near future when a scientific principle has been discovered allowing exceptionally accurate predictions of solar flares and the occurrence of the Sun increasing its solar output. Applying this principle, worldwide consensus has determined which day, hour, and minute the Sun will brighten so much as to boil away the Earth's seas. Realizing that the heightened insolation will destroy life as we know it, the world's nations debate what to do when the Sun "goes off." Since the Earth's rotation continues at 360 degrees in 24 hours, it will take only one day to cause all of the Earth's oceans to boil away. Terrific hurricanes and tidal waves will also occur, causing all buildings to be destroyed. If there are any survivors, they will be in hardened bunkers deep underground, and they will only be able to last as long as their food lasts.

The unavoidability of the impending doom has caused some technologically advanced countries to look for sanctuary on another planet, such as Mars.

This is all scheduled to happen in a few years, and the exact minute and hour of the Sun's increase in radiance does not give the human race much time to devise a way of navigating space to an orbit as far away as Mars.

Nevertheless, massive building programs are initiated, and hundreds of spaceships are raised, many of them unfit for flight.

A series of national lotteries are established with grand prize being a ticket to ride a spaceship off the Earth, and possibly make it as far as Mars. Many spaceships, however, were built without landing gear. Although many ships were supposed to have shortwave radios to communicate with each other, many of the shortwave radios were simply empty cases as the tubes and wires had been left out.

The protagonist of the story has been elected into a position of authority, and must choose which people to take with him to Mars. He has only a limited number of tickets, and knows there will come a time when people with guns will storm their way on board, rather than stand in line until the tickets are depleted. The book is titled "One in Three Hundred" because only one in three hundred people in the United States will get a ticket to leave the Earth, and there is still a question whether the spaceships will have enough air, or even be able to travel to Mars in time, and nobody is certain whether the atmosphere of Mars is breathable, or whether Mars will even be habitable when they get there.

== Critical reception ==
Damon Knight wrote a scathing review of the novel, condemning both its tone and plausibility. Galaxy reviewer Groff Conklin more charitably described the novel as "a thrilling and tragic story." Anthony Boucher, who had published the original stories in The Magazine of Fantasy & Science Fiction, reviewed the novel as "McIntosh's best work and one of the most human science fiction stories by anyone." P. Schuyler Miller noted the popularity of the original stories and termed McIntosh "a writer to watch."

== See also ==
- List of science fiction novels
