= Six Gates from Limbo =

1968 novel by J. T. McIntosh

First edition, cover artist: Colin Andrews

Six Gates from Limbo is a science fiction novel by Scottish writer J. T. McIntosh, first published in serial form in Worlds of If magazine. The serial was titled "Six Gates to Limbo" in the magazine, appearing starting in January 1969. Copyright was then secured in Great Britain in 1968 by Michael Joseph Ltd. It was published in August 1969 in New York City by Avon Books.

== Plot ==
On awakening in an idyllic tropical paradise, Rex is disoriented and possibly afflicted with amnesia. He knows his name, but the particulars are curiously missing. He spends his first week exploring, and discovers that his Eden-like paradise is surrounded by a huge unscalable wall 50 miles in circumference. Furthermore, there are six gateways at roughly equal intervals, but there is no way to climb up there and see where they go.

After a significant amount of exploring, he finds a single house that may hold the answers to his missing memory. How he could have missed it on first waking, is beyond him. Maybe he was just pointed in the wrong direction, and he started wandering off randomly, and forgot to turn around. Inside, he discovers what appears to be three suspended animation tanks, one of which is labeled REX, another REGINA - both with their tops off - and on looking inside, mysteriously vacant. The other tank is labeled VENUS and holds a woman who is the most breathtakingly beautiful thing he has ever seen.
