= Gordon Landsborough =

English publisher and bookseller (1913–1983)

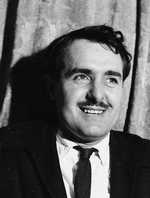
- Born: 1913; Huddersfield, West Yorkshire, England
- Died: 1983 (aged 70)
- Occupations: Writer, publisher

Gordon Holmes Landsborough, (1913–1983), English publisher, author and bookseller, was in the forefront of change in the paperback publishing and bookselling industries in England during the 1950s to 1980s. Considered a "maverick publishing genius", he was noted for his phenomenal drive and energy, his innovative business ideas and also for his prolific output as an author.

== Early life ==
Born in 1913 in Huddersfield, Yorkshire, Gordon Landsborough left school at 14 to help support his family. In the evenings he went to night classes, eventually becoming a chemist with the research department of ICI. Continuing his studies, he turned to journalism and worked on a number of papers and journals in the north of England. In 1938, he started up ARP News, a magazine promoting air raid precautions to a war-nervous England.

He moved to London in 1939, where, among other business ventures, in 1940 he started Reveille, which was originally the official newspaper of the Ex-Services' Allied Association.

In 1940 he joined up with the London Scottish Regiment, serving for a time in the deserts of North Africa. His experiences there provide the material for several of his best selling novels.

== Post Second World War book publishing and writing ==
In 1949, Landsborough was hired by publishers Hamilton & Co as production editor for their entire range of books. As part of his contract with Hamilton, he negotiated a deal with them to buy one novel a month from him. He soon made sweeping changes to their lists of science fiction, crime, and romance and expanded them to include foreign legion.

By the start of 1951, Hamilton's science fiction titles were being published every two weeks and eventually evolved into the science fiction magazine, Authentic Science Fiction. With Landsborough as its first editor, it ran for 85 issues.

Landsborough left Hamilton in mid-1951 to pursue his own career as a writer and publisher. His publishing expertise was much sought after, and he was employed as an advisor to three companies in the paperback publishing industry during the next few years.

His next business venture, in 1953, was an innovation for British publishing: Weekend Novels. Published every Wednesday, they contained a complete and unabridged best selling novel in a 24-page newspaper format with some advertising and were sold for sixpence through newsagents. In these: "He bought reprint rights in existing printed novels and published them each week in tabloid newspaper format without any form of binding or stapling and with line drawings as illustrations... His venture was under-capitalised and had to close after some twenty or so issues had appeared."

In 1954, after Weekend Novels closed, Landsborough returned to Hamilton's as editor of their Panther Books imprint, which would go on to become one of the leading British paperback publishing houses.

In 1957, Landsborough left Panther Books to start up Four Square Books, backed by the tobacco company Godfrey Phillips. Michael Geare, who was employed by him in 1957 as sales manager, said of him: "He was a gifted, clever, likeable chap, and really knew everything about book publishing. On one occasion when we were a book short on the list, he took five days off and wrote the book himself – 'Return Via Benghazi' or something. It wasn't half a bad paperback, either."

Landsborough left Four Square Books in the late 1950s to establish, in late 1960, Mayfair Books and also one of England's first children's paperback companies, Armada Books. The Armada Books list included, somewhat controversially, Enid Blyton, whose books at that time were frowned on by libraries and academics but still sold in their hundreds of thousands. The list also included W. E. John's immensely popular Biggles series and stories he wrote for children based on the popular television series Bonanza. Armada Books was sold to Collins Books in 1963.

In the early 1960s Landsborough, together with two film-producers, set up a film company to produce a film version of Werfel's novel The Forty Days of Musa Dagh. An edition of this book had already been published by Mayfair Books, and he approached Werfel's widow for the film rights. The project advanced to the stage of Landsborough writing a film treatment, and it being bought by an Italian film studio, before it was discovered that Metro Goldwyn-Mayer had acquired the film rights in 1932 and still held them.

In 1965 he started up another children's publishing company, Dragon Books. His list included his own abridgements for children of Edgar Rice Burroughs' Tarzan books and P. C. Wren's Beau Geste. Dragon Books was later acquired by Granada Publishing Ltd.

In 1950, initially as part of his contract with Hamilton's, Landsborough started writing novels, prolifically producing around 90 books over the next 35 years. In 1953 he told newspapers that in a period of just three years from 1950 to 1953 he wrote 51 novels (at least 49 of which were accepted) at a rate of a million words a year. Like many well-known authors during those economically tough post war years, he wrote genre novels under pseudonyms for the rapidly growing paperback market, to augment his income. Most of these were westerns and crime novels, "mass produced" using a tape recorder at a rate of about one a month.

He wrote 13 books under his own name, including, in 1956, the best selling Tobruk Commando. Also in 1956 were published The Battle of the River Plate (with sales revenue going to the survivors' fund), the book of the film Storm Center, starring Bette Davis, and the book of the film The Bold and the Brave, starring Mickey Rooney. In the 1970s he continued to write, producing another five books including the popular Glasshouse Gang series.

A short story, Something in the Air, one of two commissioned in 1970 by Philip Harbottle, editor of the short-lived science fiction magazine, Vision of Tomorrow, was published in Fantasy Adventures No 4, edited by Philip Harbottle.

A number of his early books, originally written under pseudonyms, have been republished since 2003, some now under his own name, in both hard copy and as ebooks.

In 2015, a book, In Search of Burke & Wills: The Story of William Landsborough, Queensland's Forgotten Explorer that Gordon researched and wrote the first draft of in 1972 when he was living in Australia, about a distant relative, explorer William Landsborough was edited and published by his daughter Diana Landsborough.

== Magazine publishing and remainder bookselling in the 1970s and 1980s ==
In 1971–73 he worked on freelance publishing ventures involving tourism and travel in Hong Kong and Australia, including the establishment of LookEast magazine.

In 1973 he returned to England and turned his hand to book selling, opening up a remainder book selling business, Bargain Books. This mushroomed into a highly successful business, with four stores.

Gordon Landsborough died in 1983, aged 70. He had five children by his marriage to Louvain (Peggy) Hussey: Drew, Stuart (proprietor of Puzzling World in Wānaka, New Zealand), Diana, Bonny and Euan.

== Bibliography ==
=== Books and short stories published as by Gordon Landsborough ===
==== Non fiction ====
- Tobruk Commando (1956)
- The Battle of the River Plate (1956)
- In Search of Burke and Wills: The Story of William Landsborough, Queensland's Forgotten Explorer (2015)

==== Novels ====
- The Bold and the Brave (novelisation of the film script The Bold and the Brave by Robert Lewin) (1956)
- Storm Center (novelisation of the film script Storm Center by Daniel Tardash and Elick Moll) (1956)
- Battery from Hellfire (published in the US as Desert Fury) (1958)
- Patrol to Benghazi (1959)
- The Violent People (1960)
- The Gulf of Pain (1962)
- Long Run to Tobruk (1975)
- The Glasshouse Gang (1976)
- Benghazi Breakout (1976)
- Desert Marauders (1976)
- The Dead Commando (1976)
- Tombstone's Goldmine (2003) (first published 1951 as Hombre from Tombstone by Mike M'Cracken)
- Battle at Broken Knee (2003) (first published 1953 as Careless O'Connor by Mike M'Cracken)
- Stampede County (2003) (first published 1953 as Kiowa Man by Mike M'Cracken)
- Railroad Saboteurs (2003) (first published 1954 as War Dust in Dakota by Mike M'Cracken)
- Secret of the Cannon (2003) (first published 1954 as O'Connor Rides In by Mike M'Cracken)

==== Short stories ====
- Something in the Air (2003), published in Fantasy Adventures No 4, edited by Philip Harbottle

=== Novels published under pseudonyms credited to Gordon Landsborough ===
==== Mike M'Cracken ====
- Blood on His Gloves (1950)
- Black Death (1951)
- Black Hammer (1951)
- Flaming Frontier (1951) (republished 2003 as by Brian Park)
- Fortress El Zeeb (1951)
- Hombre from Tombstone (1951) (republished 2003 as Tombstone's Goldmine by Gordon Landsborough)
- Killer in Canvas Jeans (1951)
- Lynch Law (1951)
- Again, the Pony Express (1952) (republished 2003 as Riders of the Pony Express by LG Holmes)
- Brand of the Big L (1952)
- Cheyenne Joe (1952) (republished 2003 as The Stolen Bounty by Ian James Bonney)
- Legionnaire From Texas (1952)
- Renegade Legionnaire (1952)
- The Dog Men (1952) (republished 2003 as by John Battle)
- The Pony Express (1952) (republished 2003 as Iron Jack Rides by LG Holmes)
- Back to the Legion (1953)
- Careless O'Connor (1953) (republished 2003 as Battle at Broken Knee by Gordon Landsborough)
- Death Smells of Cordite (1953)
- Kiowa Man (1953) (republished 2003 as Stampede County by Gordon Landsborough)
- Law of the Lariat (1953)
- Lone Cherokee (1953) (republished 2003 as Fortress Santa Maria by Philip Cornwell)
- Protection Agent (1953)
- Purple Bonanza (1953)
- Red Man's Mesa (1953
- The Bounty Man (1953)
- The Spahis (1953)
- Apache Manhunt (1954)
- O'Connor Rides In (1954) (republished 2003 as Secret of the Cannon by Gordon Landsborough)
- On to Virginia City (1954)
- The Bandaged Riders (1954)
- The War Trail (1954) (republished 2003 as by Drew Mara)
- Union Soldier (1954)
- War Dust in Dakota (1954) (republished 2003 as Railroad Saboteurs by Gordon Landsborough)
- Storm Apache (1955)

==== Tom Gordon ====
- The Fence Busters (1952)

==== G-Man Greer ====
- Call in the Feds (1951)
- FBI Showdown (1952)
- FBI Special Agent (1952)
- Federal Agent (1952)

==== Alan Holmes ====
- Quick on the Draw (1953)
- Gunsmoke among the Cactus (1954)
- Outlaw's Mesa (1957)
- Mesa Feud (1960)
- The Mormon Kid (1960)
- The Rebel (1961)
- Hidden Guns (1961)
- Manhunt (1961) (Reprinted 1968 as Wanted Dead or Alive)
- Manbuster (1962)
- Bonanza (1965) (produced under licence)
- Hoss of Bonanza (1965) (produced under licence)
- Little Joe of Bonanza (1966) (produced under licence)
- Boss of the Diamond-O (1961)
- The Long Trail (1961)

==== LG Holmes ====
- Riders of the Pony Express (2003) (first published 1952 as Again, the Pony Express by Mike M'Cracken)

==== Tex McQuaid ====
- Silver Dollar Trail (1953)

==== Joe P Heggy (House name) ====
- The Grab (1953)
- Make It Nylons (1953)
- Poison Ivy (1953)

==== Duke Montana (House name) ====
- Posse To Smith Valley (1952)

=== Other pseudonyms known to have been used in his writing ===
- Lan Holmes (LookEast magazine pseudonym, 1972)
- Gregory M Warren (LookEast magazine pseudonym, 1972)
- J.J. Putz (Authentic Science Fiction, 1954)
