= New Worlds: An Anthology =

1983 anthology edited by Michael Moorcock

New Worlds: An Anthology is an anthology edited by Michael Moorcock published in 1983.

== Plot summary ==
New Worlds: An Anthology is a collection of 30 stories, poems and articles from New Worlds magazine.

== Reception ==
Dave Langford reviewed New Worlds: An Anthology for White Dwarf #47, and stated that "it's an immensely valuable book for fans, no less than 131 pages being devoted to a complete index of all 216 issues of NW".

Dave Pringle reviewed New Worlds: An Anthology for Imagine magazine, and commented that "the highlights include Barry Bayley's brilliant pastiche of William Burroughs, 'The Four-Colour Problem' (surely the best thing Bayley ever wrote?) and Pamela Zoline's oddly moving 'The Heat Death of the Universe', a Pop Art painting come to life".

== Reviews ==
- Review by David Pringle (1984) in Interzone, #7 Spring 1984
- Review by Nick Pratt (1984) in Foundation, #31 July 1984
- Review by Norman Spinrad (1984) in Isaac Asimov's Science Fiction Magazine, August 1984
- Review by Michael A. Morrison (1984) in Fantasy Review, August 1984
- Review by Norman Spinrad (2005) in Asimov's Science Fiction, October-November 2005
