= Four Sided Triangle =

1953 film by Terence Fisher

- Theatrical release poster
- Directed by: Terence Fisher
- Written by: Paul Tabori; Terence Fisher
- Based on: Four Sided Triangle (novel) by William F. Temple
- Produced by: Michael Carreras; Alexander Paal
- Starring: Stephen Murray; Barbara Payton; James Hayter; John Van Eyssen
- Cinematography: Reg Wyer; Len Harris
- Edited by: Maurice Rootes
- Music by: Malcolm Arnold
- Production company: Hammer Film Productions
- Distributed by: Astor Pictures (US); Exclusive Films (UK)
- Release dates: 15 May 1953 (United States); 25 May 1953 (United Kingdom)
- Running time: 81 minutes
- Country: United Kingdom
- Language: English
- Budget: £25,000

Four Sided Triangle is a 1953 British second feature ('B') science-fiction film directed by Terence Fisher. It was written by Paul Tabori and Fisher, adapted from the 1949 novel by William F. Temple. It stars Stephen Murray, Barbara Payton, John Van Eyssen and James Hayter. It was produced by Hammer Film Productions at Bray Studios from August to September, 1952, and foreshadowed Hammer's later entrance into horror and science fiction. The story concerns two scientists who invent a replication machine and duplicate a woman. J. Elder Wills was the art director. It was at this time that James Carreras announced that future Hammer films would be produced by either his son Michael Carreras or Anthony Hinds on a rotating basis, resulting in almost continuous filming.

== Plot ==
Dr Harvey, an old rural physician, breaks the fourth wall to relate an unusual occurrence that happened in his village. The bulk of the story is told in flashback.

Bill and Robin are boyhood friends who compete for the affections of Lena, a beautiful girl about their own age. Lena's family moves away, and in adulthood the two men become scientists. Working in an old abandoned farmhouse, they collaborate on the Reproducer, a machine that can exactly duplicate physical objects.

Lena returns to the village several years later, and Bill and Robin's forgotten childhood feelings return. In time they abandon their work on the Reproducer, and Robin leaves the village to learn his family's business. Bill is disappointed to discover that Lena loves Robin and intends to marry him.

Hoping that he can win Lena's affections, Bill convinces her to allow him to use the Reproducer to create a duplicate of her. The experiment succeeds and Bill names the duplicate "Helen". Because Helen is an exact copy, she also falls in love with Robin. Bill believes that electric shock therapy can be used to erase Helen's knowledge of Robin. Realizing she has no chance of gaining Robin's affections, Helen agrees to the shock therapy. Bill convinces Lena to help him with the procedure in the old farmhouse. The process proceeds as planned, but the apparatus overheats, explodes and causes a terrific fire.

Robin and Dr Harvey arrive in time to rescue a woman from the fire. Bill and the other woman perish in the inferno. Harvey, having been briefed on the situation by Robin, discovers that the woman they rescued has amnesia. The two men wonder which woman they have saved. Dr Harvey recalls that Bill had to start Helen's heart with a device that he attached to the back of her neck, leaving two small scars. Robin is relieved to find that there are no marks on the neck of the woman they have rescued: she is Lena.

== Production details ==
Four Sided Triangle was an early effort by Hammer Films. The laboratory set includes "a welter of retorts, alembics, rheostats and plain, old neon tubing". This chaotic, improvised laboratory setting has been contrasted with the sophisticated labs portrayed in the Universal Horror films of the 1930s. The film relies on a minimum of trick photography and special effects, which may have been compromised by its limited budget.

Filming over two days of the five-week schedule took place at Lulworth Cove in August 1952 and was photographed by George Douglas for Picture Post.

== Differences from the novel ==
Four Sided Triangle features some differences from the original novel by William F. Temple. In the novel the duplicate, named Dorothy and nicknamed Dot, falls into a depression over being married to Bill while she is in love with Robin. She has a breakdown and has to go on holiday with Bill to recover. After they return Bill starts working on a power generator, which explodes, killing him. Lena tries to convince Robin to accept both her and Dot, but he refuses. A couple of weeks later Lena and Dot have an accident while diving in a river. One of them dies and the other is seriously injured. Dr Harvey and Robin are startled when they discover that the surviving woman cannot recall anything after the duplication and they suppose that she is repressing painful memories, so she may be Dot. Dr Harvey finds out about the marks on Dot's neck in Bill's notes and tells Robin, convincing him that the survivor is Lena. In an epilogue he reveals that he also discovered a note in which Bill recalled that during her holiday Dot had undergone plastic surgery to erase the marks, which means that there is no way of knowing whether the survivor is Lena or Dot. Dr Harvey destroys the note, enabling Robin and Lena, or Dot, to remain happy in the belief that the survivor is Lena.

== Cast ==
- Barbara Payton as Lena/Helen
- James Hayter as Dr Harvey
- Stephen Murray as Bill
- John Van Eyssen as Robin
- Percy Marmont as Sir Walter
- Jennifer Dearman as Lena as a child
- Glyn Dearman as Bill as a child
- Sean Barrett as Robin as a child
- Kynaston Reeves as Lord Grant
- John Stuart as the solicitor
- Edith Saville as Lady Grant

== Reception ==
The Monthly Film Bulletin wrote: "This is a tedious little melodrama, flatly directed, written and played. Barbara Payton seems unlikely to achieve fame for her histrionic ability and Stephen Murray's performance is unadulerated ham."

Kine Weekly wrote: "The picture opens with Robin and Bill proving that they can faithfully duplicate anything from rubies to radium, but instead of making something of the epoch-making achievement, it plunges into fabulous romantic pulp fiction. Barbara Payton displays limited acting ability as Lena and Helen, and Stephen Murray looks worried, and no wonder, as Bill, but John Van Eyssen and James Hayter are reasonably rational in the ticklish roles of Robin and Harvey. The scientific trappings are elaborate and the explosive climax is a corker, but high-powered presentation fails adequately to atone for its bizarre mumbo-jumbo."

Variety wrote: "A possible exploitation film, this slow-moving British conception of a horrorific yarn has the added handicap of having no big draw names recognizable by prospective patrons in this country. Even the attempt to excuse the basic idea (reproducing animals and humans) by sugarcoating with some scientific hocus-pocus is not saved by a somewhat stirring climax. Too many tedious passages and dearth of humor bog it down."

The Radio Times Guide to Films gave the film 2/5 stars, writing: "One of the earliest Hammer movies made prior to their international breakthrough with The Quatermass Xperiment and The Curse of Frankenstein, this slow-moving tale is directed by Terence Fisher with little flair."

In British Sound Films: The Studio Years 1928–1959 David Quinlan rated the film as "mediocre", writing: "Early Hammer excursion into horror field: laboratory scenes good, rest ludicrous."

Leslie Halliwell said: "A very early entry in this field; not too well done, but faithful to its silly theme."
