= The Languages of Pao =

1958 novel by Jack Vance

- First edition
- Author: Jack Vance
- Cover artist: Ric Binkley
- Language: English
- Genre: Science fiction
- Publisher: Avalon Books
- Publication date: 1958
- Publication place: United States
- Media type: Print (hardback)
- Pages: 223

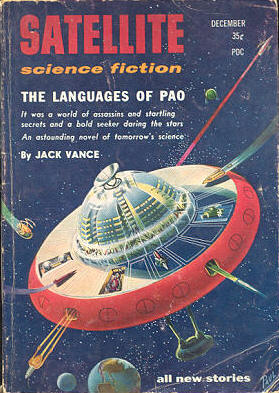
The Languages of Pao was originally published in the December 1957 issue of Satellite Science Fiction, under what is likely the last SF magazine cover by Frank R. Paul.

The Languages of Pao is a science fiction novel by American writer Jack Vance, first published in 1958, based on the Sapir–Whorf hypothesis, which asserts that a language's structure and grammar construct the perception and consciousness of its speakers. In the novel, the placid people from the planet Pao rely on other planets for technological innovations and manufactured goods and they do not resist when an invading force occupies the land and levies heavy taxes. To expel the aggressors and make the planet more independent, three new languages are introduced. A scientific language induces its speakers to innovate more; a well-ordered language encourages its speakers to be industrious; and a warlike language induces competitiveness and aggression. The new languages change the culture and Pao ousts their overlords and develops a sophisticated modern economy.

A shorter version was published in Satellite Science Fiction in late 1957. After the Avalon Books hardcover appeared the next year, it was reprinted in paperback by Ace Books in 1966 and reissued in 1968 and 1974. Additional hardcover and paperback reprints have followed, as well as British, French and Italian editions.

== Plot summary ==
The planet Pao is a quiet backwater with a large, homogeneous, stolid population ruled by an absolute monarch: the Panarch. Pao's cultural homogeneity contributes to making it vulnerable to external military and economic pressures. The current Panarch attempts to hire an offworld scientist, Lord Palafox from the Breakness Institute on the planet Breakness, as a consultant in order to reform Pao. Before the deal can be concluded, however, the Panarch is assassinated by his brother Bustamonte, using mind-control over the Panarch's own son, Beran Panasper, to do so. Lord Palafox saves Beran Panasper and takes him to Breakness as a possible bargaining chip in his dealings with Pao.

Somewhat later, the predatory Brumbo Clan from the planet Batmarsh raids the virtually defenseless Pao with impunity, and the Panarch Bustamonte is forced to pay heavy tribute. To rid himself of the Brumbos, he seeks the aid of Palafox, who has a plan to create warrior, technical and mercantile castes on Pao using customized languages (named Valiant, Technicant and Cogitant) and other means to shape the mindsets of each caste, isolating them from each other and the general populace of Pao. To achieve this, each caste gets a special training area where it is completely segregated from any outside influence; the necessary land is confiscated from families, some of which have held it for countless generations — which creates some disaffection in the conservative Paonese population and earns Bustamonte the name of a tyrant.

In order to return with them to Pao incognito, Beran Panasper infiltrates a corps of interpreters being trained on Breakness. Mostly to amuse themselves, some of the young people create a language they call "Pastiche", mixing words and grammatical forms, seemingly at random, from the three newly created languages and from the original Paonese language. Palafox looks upon this development with indulgence, failing to realize the tremendous long-term significance.

Beran returns to Pao under the name Ercolo Paraio and works for a few years as a translator at several locations. Once Beran Panasper reveals to the masses that he is still alive, his uncle Bustamonte's popular support melts virtually overnight and Panasper claims the title of Panarch that is rightfully his. The Brumbo Clan is repulsed by the warrior caste. For a few years, the castes of Pao are highly successful in their respective endeavors and the planet experiences a short golden age. However, Panasper is upset about the divisions in the populace of Pao caused by the Palafox program; the three new castes speak of the rest of the Paonese as "they" rather than "we" and regard them with contempt.

Beran attempts to return the planet to its previous state by re-integrating the castes into the general populace. Palafox opposes this move and is killed, but the warrior caste stages a coup and takes command of Pao. Panasper convinces them that they cannot rule the planet alone, since they share no common language with the rest of the population and cannot rely on the cooperation of the other segments of the people of Pao, and they allow him to keep his office.

One interpretation of the end of the novel is that Beran Panasper is only in nominal charge of the planet, on the sufferance of the warrior caste, and that it is uncertain what will become of him and his plans of re-uniting the populace of Pao. Another way of seeing the ending is that Beran has outfoxed the warriors by getting them to agree to his decree that "every child of Pao, of whatever caste, must learn Pastiche even in preference to the language of his father". In the end, Beran looks ahead twenty years, to a future when all inhabitants of Pao will be Pastiche-speakers — i.e., will speak a language which mixes some attributes and mindsets appropriate to peasant cultivators, proud warriors, skilled technicians and smart merchants — which will presumably shape a highly fluid and socially mobile society, composed of versatile and multi-skilled individuals.

== Reception ==
Frederik Pohl reported that Vance had "pretty carefully" worked out his extrapolation, but that "it isn't terribly convincing as presented". Pohl also noted that "Vance writes well -- sometimes even brilliantly", but that his prose sometimes seemed uneven and artificial. Floyd C. Gale called the novel "a good idea well handled". David Langford cited Vance's "engaging speculation", but concluded that the protagonist "seems too weak a character for his leading role", while "the culture and landscape of Pao are grey and ill-defined, in strong contrast to the exotically colourful societies and ecologies which became Vance's trademark".

== Sapir–Whorf hypothesis ==
In linguistics, the Sapir–Whorf hypothesis asserts that a language's structure and grammar construct the perception and consciousness of its speakers.

This novel centers on a fictional experiment in molding a civilization by designing its language. As the mastermind behind this experiment, Lord Palafox, says in chapter 9: "We must alter the mental framework of the Paonese people, which is most easily achieved by altering the language." His son, Finisterle, says in chapter 11 to a class of linguists in training: "every language impresses a certain world-view upon the mind."

== Euphemisms ==
Vance uses some unusual euphemisms in this book.

- "subaqueation" for "drowning", the traditional method of execution on Pao
- "neutraloids" for "eunuchs", the physically enhanced but castrated guards of the Panarch

== Sources ==
- Underwood, Tim; Chuck Miller (1980). Jack Vance. New York: Taplinger Publishing Company. pp. 228. ISBN 0-8008-4295-2.
