= Flight from Rebirth =

1971 novel by J. T. McIntosh

- First edition, cover art by Paul Lehr
- Author: J. T. McIntosh
- Language: English
- Publisher: Avon Books
- Publication date: 1971

Flight from Rebirth is a science fiction novel by British writer J. T. McIntosh, published in July, 1971 by Avon Books.

== Plot ==
Modern science has discovered a way to rejuvenate people. It is just like immortality, but the rejuvenation process causes the human brain to be "restarted"–effectively losing all its former memories so the recipient starts life anew, like a blank slate.

The world has reached a stage where there is very little privacy, and the rigors of modern society invade just about every corner of life. Even still, there are outcasts in remote areas who find a way of surviving without being part of the wider society.

The main character, Benny Rice, struggles to maintain a low profile, even going so far as to quit and change jobs when offered a promotion; his personal history mysteriously dates back to a series of dead ends. No matter what job he has had, he always quits before getting promoted. An amicable, friendly sort, he is in for quite a surprise when an unlikely friend, a multi-billionairess, is so taken with his gentleness and kindness that she decides to write him into her will as the principal co-beneficiary to her vast estate of billions. The "Trust" is a foundation that encourages the successful, the accomplished, and the intelligent—basically the cream of the crop—to undergo the rejuvenation process. However, her will requires the Rejuvenation Foundation give Benny exactly the same treatment reserved to the successful and rich. Public notoriety is exactly what Benny Rice does not want. He only wants to be left alone and allowed to go on with his quiet and peaceful life in a position in life that is least subject to public scrutiny.

== See also ==
- List of science fiction novels
