= Satellite Science Fiction =

American science fiction magazine, published from 1956 to 1959

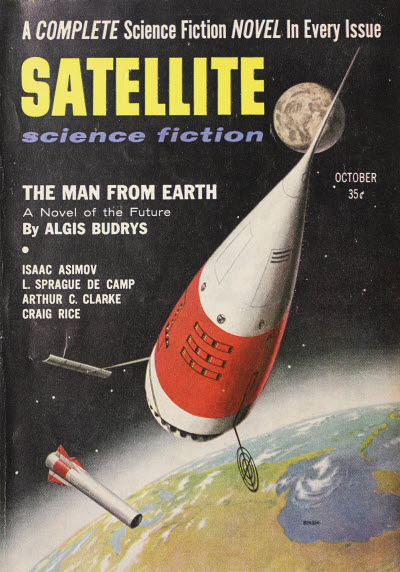
The first issue of Satellite Science Fiction; cover art by Ed Emshwiller

Satellite Science Fiction was an American science-fiction magazine published from October 1956 to April 1959 by Leo Margulies' Renown Publications. Initially, Satellite was digest-sized and ran a full-length novel in each issue with a handful of short stories accompanying it. The policy was intended to help it compete against paperbacks, which were taking a growing share of the market. Sam Merwin edited the first two issues; Margulies took over when Merwin left, and then hired Frank Belknap Long for the February 1959 issue. That issue saw the format change to letter size, in the hope that the magazine would be more prominent on newsstands. The experiment was a failure and Margulies closed the magazine when the sales figures came in.

The novels included the original version of Philip K. Dick's first novel, The Cosmic Puppets, and well-received work by Algis Budrys and Jack Vance, though the quality was not always high. Isaac Asimov, Arthur C. Clarke, and L. Sprague de Camp were among the short story contributors. Sam Moskowitz wrote a series of articles on the early history of science fiction for Satellite; these were later to be revised as part of his book Explorers of the Infinite. In 1958 Margulies tracked down the first magazine publication of H. G. Wells' The Time Machine from 1894 to 1895 and reprinted a short excerpt from it that had been omitted by every subsequent printing.

== Publication history ==
In 1952, Leo Margulies and H. Lawrence Herbert founded King-Size Publications, which published Saint Detective Magazine and Fantastic Universe. By 1956 the company was in debt, and Margulies sold his share of the company to Herbert. With the money from the sale he founded Renown Publications, launching Michael Shayne Mystery Magazine in September 1956, and the first issue of Satellite Science Fiction in October. Satellite's distributor, PDC, was run by old friends of Margulies. The magazine began as a bimonthly, though Margulies hoped to make it monthly eventually. The first editor was Sam Merwin, with whom Margulies had worked since the 1930s. Margulies also hoped to launch a book imprint, Renown Books, with the goal of issuing four books a month. One title each month would be science fiction; the content would be featured in Satellite before it appeared in book form.

Merwin left after two issues and Margulies took over as the editor with the February 1957 issue. In an attempt to make Satellite more visible on the newsstands, Margulies changed the format from digest-size to letter-size with the February 1959 issue, handing over the editorship to Frank Belknap Long at the same time, and switching to a monthly schedule. This proved to be a mistake. The production costs for the new format were higher, and the sales figures for the first issue in the new format were weak; when Margulies saw the numbers he immediately closed down the magazine. The June 1959 issue was assembled but never printed, though a few galley proofs made their way into the hands of collectors. (Note: Science fiction historian Mike Ashley records that two copies were sent to the Library of Congress in order to register copyright, and two other copies were known to exist as of 1978.) The end of the magazine also meant the end of Margulies' plans for Renown Books.

== Contents ==
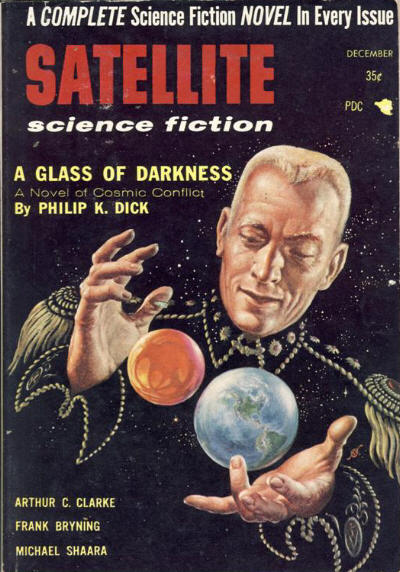
The December 1956 issue; the cover is by Kelly Freas.

Paperbacks were a growing share of the science fiction (sf) market in the mid-1950s; they were successful partly because they offered novels, which most readers preferred to short stories. Margulies decided to combat the threat from paperbacks by including a novel in every issue of the magazine. This was a strategy that had been used by pulp sf magazines like Startling Stories, for which Margulies had been editorial director. It was not common in digest magazines, where a story as short as 15,000 words might be listed as a novel on the contents page, but Margulies acquired true novel-length works, with an average length of about 40,000 words, for Satellite. Margulies used the slogan "The Magazine That Is a Book!" in advertisements for the magazine, and the tagline "A Complete Science Fiction Novel in Every Issue!" appeared on many of the covers.

The first two issues featured Algis Budrys's novel "The Man From Earth", and Philip K. Dick's debut novel, under the title "A Glass of Darkness". Both were revised and appeared as paperbacks in the next couple of years, titled Man of Earth and The Cosmic Puppets, respectively. The high standard of these two issues could not be maintained, and in the opinion of sf historians Malcolm Edwards and Mike Ashley the magazine's quality declined thereafter. Hal Clement's "Planet for Plunder", which appeared in the third issue, was told from the point of view of an alien on a mission to Earth. It was too short to fit Margulies' policy of publishing a lead novel, so Merwin wrote additional chapters from the human perspective, and alternated the two points of view in the published version. Ashley speaks highly of Clement's original novella, which was eventually published without the additions in 1972, and comments that Merwin's additions serve as "an object lesson in how to ruin a good story". Edwards and Ashley single out two other novels as worthy of mention: J. T. McIntosh's One Million Cities (in the August 1958 issue), and Jack Vance's The Languages of Pao (December 1957), described by sf critics Peter Nicholls and David Langford as "one of the most intelligent uses in genre sf" of the Whorf hypothesis – the theory that the language one speaks determines one's perception of reality. Frank Belknap Long's novel Mission to a Distant Star (February 1958) was at one point considered for publication as the first novel in the planned Renown Books line.

The novels in the first five issues were all original, but in August 1957 the lead novel was a reprint: John Christopher's The Year of the Comet, which had been published in the UK in 1955, but had not yet appeared in the US. More reprints followed, including Charles Eric Maine's Wall of Fire, E. C. Tubb's The Resurrected Man, and Noel Loomis's The Man With Absolute Motion. Each had been published in the previous few years in the UK, but not in the US.

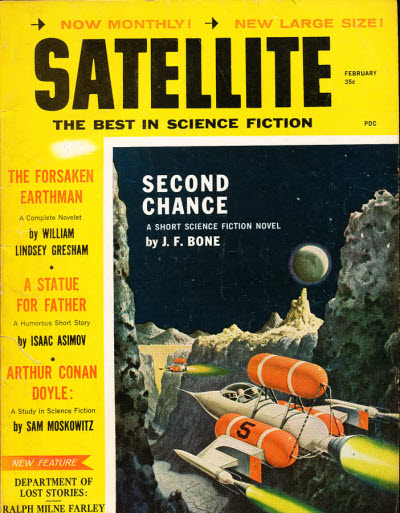
The first letter-sized issue, dated February 1959; the cover is by Alex Schomburg.

Since the word count for the whole magazine was only about 53,000 words, there was little space for other stories or for non-fiction features, and as a result the accompanying stories were usually very short expositions of an idea or joke; in Michael Shaara's "Four-Billion Dollar Door", the first crewed mission to the moon lands successfully but discovers that the door has frozen shut and cannot be opened. Arthur C. Clarke and Dal Stevens were frequent contributors of short fiction, and there were appearances by other well-known writers such as Isaac Asimov and L. Sprague de Camp. Margulies was aware that a couple of pages of H. G. Wells' 1895 novel The Time Machine had been omitted from every printing of the novel since its original serialization in 1894–1895 in The New Review, so he paid for a library search and was rewarded by the discovery of the magazine containing the missing pages in the New York Public Library, across the street from his office. The omitted material, which dealt with a far future where humans have degenerated to small, rabbit-like creatures, was reprinted in the August 1958 issue.

Sam Moskowitz began a book review column in February 1957 that quickly turned into a series of articles about early science fiction, beginning with "The Real Earth Satellite Story" in the June 1957 issue, about the idea of satellites in early sf. Moskowitz also suggested stories that could be reprinted to supplement the articles, such as Fitz-James O'Brien's 1864 short story "How I Overcame My Gravity", which accompanied the essay on O'Brien in the June 1958 issue. Most of these articles were later revised for his book, Explorers of the Infinite, though the illustrations, which reproduced early artwork or book covers, were omitted for the book version. Margulies wrote an editorial for every issue except the last one. In the April 1959 issue his essay argued that a letter column was a way to "[strengthen] the bond between writers and readers"; he accordingly introduced a letter column in the May 1959 issue, which proved to be the last. Satellite's artwork was unremarkable, in the opinion of Mike Ashley; he singles out Alex Schomburg's half-dozen covers for praise, but describes the interior art, much of it by Leo Morey, as "mediocre".

When the format changed, at the start of 1959, Margulies dropped the policy of having a full-length novel in every issue. He added a "Department of Lost Stories", which reprinted old stories, selected by reader's requests; the first to be reprinted was Ralph Milne Farley's 1932 short story "Abductor Minimi Digit", requested by Theodore Sturgeon. The June 1959 issue, which was never distributed, would have contained Philip José Farmer's "The Strange Birth", which eventually appeared in the May 1960 issue of The Magazine of Fantasy & Science Fiction, under the title "Open to Me, My Sister". A mockup of the cover for the July 1959 has survived, showing some of the planned contents; the two unpublished issues would have contained stories and articles by Arthur C. Clarke, A. E. van Vogt, and Frank Herbert, among others. Most of the stories and articles were eventually published elsewhere.

== Bibliographic details ==
	Jan	Feb	Mar	Apr	May	Jun	Jul	Aug	Sep	Oct	Nov	Dec
1956										1/1		1/2
1957		1/3		1/4		1/5		1/6		2/1		2/2
1958		2/3		2/4		2/5		2/6		3/1		3/2
1959		3/3	3/4	3/5	3/6							
Issues of Satellite showing volume/issue numbers, and indicating editors: in order Sam Merwin, Leo Margulies, and Frank Belknap Long.

Satellite was digest-sized for the first fourteen issues, and converted to letter-size for the last four. It maintained a regular bimonthly schedule until the switch to letter size, at which point it became monthly. There were three volumes of six numbers each. The digest issues were each 128 pages, and the letter-sized issues were 64 pages. The price was 35 cents throughout. Sam Merwin edited the first two issues; he was succeeded by Leo Margulies for the rest of the digest run. Frank Belknap Long took over as editor for the four letter-sized issues. Margulies' wife, Cylvia, was managing editor for all issues, under her maiden name, Cylvia Kleinman. The publisher for all issues was Renown Publications, which was wholly owned by Leo Margulies.

== Sources ==
- Ashley, Michael (1978). The History of the Science Fiction Magazine Part 4 1956–1965. London: New English Library. ISBN 978-0-450-03438-1.
- Ashley, Mike (1985a). "Fantastic Universe". In Tymn, Marshall B.; Ashley, Mike (eds.). Science Fiction, Fantasy, and Weird Fiction Magazines. Westport, Connecticut: Greenwood Press. pp. 250–254. ISBN 978-0-313-21221-5.
- Ashley, Mike (1985b). "Satellite Science Fiction". In Tymn, Marshall B.; Ashley, Mike (eds.). Science Fiction, Fantasy, and Weird Fiction Magazines. Westport, Connecticut: Greenwood Press. pp. 493–497. ISBN 978-0-313-21221-5.
- Ashley, Mike (2005). Transformations: The Story of the Science-Fiction Magazines from 1950 to 1970. Liverpool: Liverpool University Press. ISBN 978-0-85323-779-2.
- Sherman, Philip (2017). Leo Margulies: Giant of the Pulps. Altus Press. ISBN 978-1-61827-298-0.
- Weinberg, Robert (1988). A Biographical Dictionary of Science Fiction and Fantasy Artists. Westport, Connecticut: Greenwood Press. ISBN 978-0-313-24349-3.
