= Robert Conroy Goldston =

American history writer (1927–1982)

Robert Conroy Goldston (9 July 1927 in New York – 1982) was an American history writer and the son of Philip Henry Goldston and Josephine Conroy. He lived in Los Angeles for some time and then settled on Ibiza in the Balearic Islands, having married Marguerite Garvey, a classical pianist, on 3 January 1956, the union producing five daughters and a son.

Goldston was educated in Los Angeles, the Midwest and attended Columbia University between 1946 and 1953. He served in the U.S. Army, did some sailing on the Great Lakes and at one time was a science-fiction cover artist under the pseudonym James Stark for Nebula Science Fiction. (example: December 1956 and May 1957 Nebula Science Fiction) He was awarded a Guggenheim Fellowship in fiction in 1957–8. A derisive description of Franco in The Civil War in Spain, “the fat fratricide sitting on a gilt throne in Madrid, staring past his stuffed Jefes into the black regions promised him by the half men bishops ... those puffed and fearful eyes that gazed paternally from the faces of newspapers and posters and postage stamps and coins” led to his being expelled and later permitted to return after the intervention of a de Vilmorin family member and Franco's own brother.

Goldston's prolific output of non-fiction histories lasted from 1947 to 1985.

== Selected most popular works ==
- The Great Depression; the United States in the thirties – 11 editions between 1968 and 1985
- The Negro Revolution – 11 editions between 1968 and 1969
- Sinister Touches : the secret war against Hitler – 3 editions in 1982
- The Rise of Red China – 8 editions between 1962 and 1969
- The Sword of the Prophet – 4 editions between 1979 and 1981
- The Russian Revolution – 11 editions between 1966 and 1983
- The Life and Death of Nazi Germany – 14 editions between 1947 and 1983
- The Civil War in Spain – 12 editions between 1966 and 1969
- The American Nightmare; Senator Joseph R. McCarthy and the politics of hate – 5 editions in 1973
- The Road between the Wars : 1918–1941 – 3 editions between 1978 and 1980
