= Anne Patrizio =

Scottish activist

Anne Patrizio MBE was a British retired teacher and leading campaigner for LGBT rights in Scotland.

As one of the principal organisers of Parents Enquiry Scotland, Patrizio supported parents of lesbian, gay, bisexual and transgender people and gave evidence to the Scottish Parliament in support of gay law reform.

She died in Gorizia, Italy, on 13 April 2019.
