= New Worlds (magazine) =

British science fiction and fantasy magazine

- First issue cover, 1946
- Categories: Science fiction magazine
- First issue: 1936; 90 years ago
- Country: United Kingdom
- Based in: London
- Language: English

New Worlds was a British science fiction magazine that began in 1936 as a fanzine called Novae Terrae. John Carnell, who became Novae Terrae's editor in 1939, renamed it New Worlds that year. He was instrumental in turning it into a professional publication in 1946 and was the first editor of the new incarnation. It became the leading UK science fiction magazine; the period to 1960 has been described by science fiction historian Mike Ashley as the magazine's "Golden Age".

Carnell joined the British Army in 1940 following the outbreak of the Second World War and returned to civilian life in 1946. He negotiated a publishing agreement for the magazine with Pendulum Publications, but only three issues of New Worlds were produced before Pendulum's bankruptcy in late 1947. A group of science fiction fans formed a company called Nova Publications to revive the magazine; the first issue under their management appeared in mid-1949. New Worlds continued to appear on a regular basis until issue 20, published in early 1953, following which a change of printers led to a hiatus in publication. In early 1954, when Maclaren & Sons acquired control of Nova Publications, the magazine returned to a stable monthly schedule.

Roberts & Vinter acquired New Worlds in 1964 when Michael Moorcock became editor. By the end of 1966, financial problems with their distributor led Roberts & Vinter to abandon New Worlds, but with the aid of an Arts Council grant obtained by Brian Aldiss, Moorcock was able to publish the magazine independently. He featured experimental and avant-garde material, and New Worlds became the focus of the "New Wave" of science fiction. Reaction among the science fiction community was mixed, with partisans and opponents of the New Wave debating the merits of New Worlds in the columns of fanzines such as Zenith-Speculation. Several of the regular contributors during this period, including Brian Aldiss, J. G. Ballard, Thomas M. Disch, and Moorcock himself, became major names in the field. By 1970, Moorcock was too in debt to continue with the magazine, and it became a paperback quarterly after issue 201. The title has been revived multiple times with Moorcock's direct involvement or approval; by 2021, 22 additional issues had appeared in various formats, including several anthologies.

== Publishing history ==
=== Early years ===
In 1926, Hugo Gernsback launched Amazing Stories, the first science fiction (sf) magazine. It was soon followed by other US titles also specialising in sf, such as Astounding Stories and Wonder Stories. These were distributed in the UK, and British fan organisations began to appear. In 1936, Maurice K. Hanson, a science fiction fan living in Nuneaton, founded a fanzine called Novae Terrae (Latin for "new lands" or "new worlds") for the local branch of the Science Fiction League. Hanson moved to London and his fanzine became the official publication of the Science Fiction Association, founded in 1937.

Arthur C. Clarke, John Carnell and William F. Temple became involved in Novae Terrae's production. In 1939 Hanson gave up the editorship to Carnell, who retitled the fanzine New Worlds and restarted the numbering at volume 1 number 1; the first issue under Carnell's control was dated March 1939. Carnell wanted to turn New Worlds into a professional magazine, and through W.J. Passingham, a writer, had begun discussions with a publisher named The Worlds Says Ltd. In January 1940 Carnell was asked to put together three issues, and Carnell and Passingham each put up £50 towards costs. Carnell solicited material from British authors including John F. Burke, C.S. Youd, and David McIlwain, and acquired Robert A. Heinlein's "Lost Legion", but in March internal strife led to the collapse of The World Says. Alfred Greig, the director, returned to his native Canada without repaying Carnell and Passingham, and no issues were ever printed.

	Spring			Summer			Autumn			Winter		
	Jan	Feb	Mar	Apr	May	Jun	Jul	Aug	Sep	Oct	Nov	Dec
1946							1/1			1/2		
1947										1/3		
1948												
1949				2/4					2/5			
1950			2/6			3/7						3/8
1951			3/9			3/10			4/11			12
1952	13		14		15		16		17		18	
1953	19		20			21						
1954				22	23	24	25	26	27	28	29	30
1955	31	32	33	34	35	36	37	38	39	40	41	42
1956	43	44	45	46	47	48	49	50	51	52	53	54
Issues of New Worlds from the beginning to 1956, showing volume/issue number. John Carnell was editor throughout this period. Four of the first five issues were dated only with the year; the exception was issue 3, which bore no date. Underlining indicates that the magazine was titled with the season (e.g. "Spring 1951") for that issue.

Carnell joined the army in 1940, serving with the Royal Artillery, Combined Operations, and Naval Bombardment. After his return to civilian life in January 1946 he met writer Frank Edward Arnold, who had been working with Pendulum Publications on a new science fiction line. Arnold introduced Carnell to Stephen D. Frances, Pendulum's director. Frances believed in the commercial possibilities of science fiction, and since Carnell still had the portfolio of stories he had put together in 1940, Pendulum agreed to make New Worlds into a professional magazine. The first issue appeared in July 1946, although there was no date on the magazine. The initial print run was 15,000, but only 3,000 copies were sold—a very disappointing return.

Carnell felt that the cover artwork, which he considered to be weak, was partly responsible for the poor sales. He put together a new design, based on covers from two US science fiction magazines, and gave it to artist Victor Caesari to complete. The resulting space scene was the cover for the second issue, which appeared in October 1946; in combination with Pendulum's investment in promoting the magazine this led to much better sales, and the second issue sold out completely. Pendulum rebound the remaining copies of the first issue with the second cover design, and repriced them at 1/6 (7.5p); the first two issues had been priced at 2/- (10p). The new cover and price were much more popular and the repackaged first issue, like the second, soon sold out.

Pendulum Publications produced one more issue in October 1947, shortly before going bankrupt and thus leaving New Worlds without a publisher. The magazine was saved by a group of sf fans who since 1946 had been meeting regularly on Thursday nights at the White Horse public house on New Fetter Lane, near Fleet Street. (Note: These meetings were the setting for a group of stories by Arthur C. Clarke, collected as Tales from the White Hart.) At one of those meetings it was suggested that they form a company to revive New Worlds; one of those present, Frank Cooper, recently retired from the Royal Air Force, agreed to look into what would be necessary to start a new company.

=== Nova Publications ===
In May 1948 Carnell announced at a science fiction convention in London that plans were well underway to form a new company, to be called Nova Publications Ltd. (Note: The name was suggested by Walter Gillings' wife, Madge.) Nova raised £600 in capital and was launched in early 1949. There were initially six directors: the chairman was John Wyndham, and the remaining board members were G. Ken Chapman, Frank Cooper, Walter Gillings, Eric C. Williams, and John Carnell. A printer was found near Stoke Newington, where Frank Cooper was based, and the first issue (numbered 4, to follow on from the three Pendulum issues) appeared in June. It was planned to move to regular quarterly publication, and subsequently to a bimonthly schedule. To keep costs down Nova decided to handle the distribution themselves; this was not easy but Cooper and his assistant, Les Flood, were sufficiently successful that in July the decision was taken to go ahead with the planned quarterly schedule. A fifth issue appeared in September, and the sixth issue early the following year, dated Spring 1950.

In 1950, with New Worlds on a stable quarterly schedule, Nova Publications decided to launch a companion, Science Fantasy. They chose Walter Gillings as the editor; but he was replaced by Carnell after two issues, partly because Nova could not afford to pay two editorial salaries, and partly because of "fundamental differences of opinion". At the end of 1951 New Worlds went bimonthly, and by the middle of the year had reached a circulation of 18,000. The price had been reduced to 1/6 with the third issue, but with paper costs rising Nova looked for a cheaper printer. The new printer, The Carlton Press, was supposed to take over production with the May 1953 issue (number 21), but the issue was late, and had to be dated June 1953 instead. The issue was shoddily produced, which dismayed Nova's board, and printers' strikes caused further delays. Nova discovered that The Carlton Press was an agent with no printing facilities; they farmed out work to other printers, but were only able to get their commissions executed when they paid off any prior debts to those printers. Issue 22 was repeatedly delayed; proofs appeared in August, and the issue was promised for November. Even this schedule was not adhered to, and Carnell received a copy of the print run in January 1954. The copy was dated 1953 (with no month), and since this made it useless for distribution in 1954, Carnell refused to accept the print run.

While the dispute with the printers was going on, Carnell and Maurice Goldsmith, a journalist acquaintance of Carnell's, put together a small conference of well-known science fiction authors, including Arthur C. Clarke and John Wyndham. Goldsmith covered the conference for Illustrated, a weekly magazine, and the article caught the attention of Maclaren & Sons Ltd, a technical trade publisher interested in launching a new sf magazine. Carnell turned down the offer because of his loyalty to Nova Publications, but subsequent discussions ultimately led to Maclaren taking control of Nova, with a commitment to produce New Worlds on a monthly basis and Science Fantasy on a bimonthly schedule. By January 1954, when The Carlton Press delivered the incorrectly dated issue 22, the acquisition by Maclaren was complete, and Maclaren's legal department was helpful in resolving the dispute. The printing press which had printed the issue was not paid by The Carlton Press, so an injunction was obtained that sequestered the issues to avoid them being sold to recover the printing costs. Carnell retained the copy he had been sent in January, and it is thought that this is the only copy that exists of The Carlton Press's version of this issue, as the remainder of the printing run was destroyed after the court case. The cover painting, by Gerard Quinn, was subsequently used on issue 13 of Science Fantasy, and all the stories and editorial material eventually appeared in later issues of New Worlds over the next year.

The financial support that Maclaren provided meant that once issue 22 appeared in April 1954, it was the start of a regular monthly schedule that lasted until 1964 with just one hiccup: a printing dispute in 1959 delayed the August issue and it was combined with the September issue. Despite this stability, New Worlds's circulation began to decline in the early 1960s. Nova Publications had launched a third magazine, Science Fiction Adventures, in 1958, but both it and Science Fantasy were also losing readers, and in May 1963 Science Fiction Adventures was cancelled. In September of that year Nova's board decided to close down both New Worlds and Science Fantasy, and in preparation for the change Carnell signed a contract in December 1963 to edit an original anthology series, New Writings in SF, for publisher Dennis Dobson.

=== Roberts & Vinter ===
	Jan	Feb	Mar	Apr	May	Jun	Jul	Aug	Sep	Oct	Nov	Dec
1957	55	56	57	58	59	60	61	62	63	64	65	66
1958	67	68	69	70	71	72	73	74	75	76	77	78
1959	79	80	81	82	83	84	85	86		87	88	89
1960	90	91	92	93	94	95	96	97	98	99	100	101
1961	102	103	104	105	106	107	108	109	110	111	112	113
1962	114	115	116	117	118	119	120	121	122	123	124	125
1963	126	127	128	129	130	131	132	133	134	135	136	137
1964	138	139	140	141	142		143		144		145	
1965	146	147	148	149	150	151	152	153	154	155	156	157
1966	158	159	160	161	162	163	164	165	166	167	168	169
1967	170		171	172			173	174	175	176	177	178
Issues of New Worlds from 1957 to 1967, showing issue number. The colours identify the editors for each issue: John Carnell Michael Moorcock

The magazines were unexpectedly saved by David Warburton of Roberts & Vinter, a London publishing house. The printer who had been printing both New Worlds and Science Fantasy happened to meet Warburton in a pub, and mentioned that he was looking for additional work to fill the gaps in his schedule left by the demise of the magazines. Roberts & Vinter were having difficulty getting good distribution for their existing titles, which were violent thrillers, and were interested in acquiring more respectable titles that would help them penetrate the British distribution network, which was heavily dependent on W.H. Smith and John Menzies, the two main British newsagent chains. Warburton's partner, Godfrey Gold, ran a company that was connected to Roberts & Vinter and published pin-up magazines; like Warburton, Gold needed to improve his ability to distribute his titles.

When Michael Moorcock, who by this time had begun selling stories to Carnell, heard of the plans to cease publication of New Worlds and Science Fantasy, he wrote a letter that appeared in issue 141 lamenting the loss to the British science fiction field of both the magazines and Carnell himself. Carnell did not want to continue to edit the magazines in addition to New Writings in SF, and recommended Moorcock to Warburton. Kyril Bonfiglioli, an Oxford art dealer who was a friend of Brian Aldiss, also expressed an interest. Warburton gave Moorcock the choice of which magazine to edit; Moorcock chose New Worlds, and Bonfiglioli became the new editor of Science Fantasy. Moorcock wanted to switch to a large format, and showed Warburton a dummy issue he had made up, but Warburton insisted on a paperback format in order to fit in with the other titles they were producing, though he agreed to revisit the format in the future if sales improved. The first issue under Moorcock's control was number 142, dated May/June 1964. The schedule was initially bimonthly, but at the start of 1965 it returned to a stable monthly schedule.

In July 1966 Roberts & Vinter's distributor, Thorpe & Porter, went bankrupt, owing Roberts & Vinter a substantial sum. The resulting financial pressure led Roberts & Vinter to focus on their more profitable magazines, and they made plans to close down both Science Fantasy and New Worlds. After hearing of these plans, Moorcock and Warburton began to consider forming a separate company to continue publishing New Worlds, and Brian Aldiss contacted well-known literary figures such as J. B. Priestley, Kingsley Amis, Marghanita Laski, and Angus Wilson to gain support for an application for a grant from the British Arts Council in late 1966. In early January 1967 Aldiss discovered that the grant application would be successful, and that New Worlds would be awarded £150 per issue, though in the event the grant certification was delayed until at least May. (Note: On 17 May a letter of Moorcock's to Judith Merril mentions that the grant is still not official.) The grant was enough to enable the magazine to continue, though it would not cover all costs. A publisher still had to be found, and both Fontana and Panther Books expressed an interest, but the promise of the money and the prestige of an Arts Council grant convinced Warburton to stay involved personally. While these negotiations were going on, two more issues were assembled from backfile material and donated stories. Roberts & Vinter had ceased to exist by this time, so a sister company, Gold Star Publications, became the publisher for both these issues, with Warburton and Aldiss providing Gold Star with personal financial guarantees. (Note: Moorcock recalls guaranteeing editorial expenses and payments to contributors, with Warburton guaranteeing the printing, but Greenland says that the guarantees were by Aldiss and Warburton.) These two issues appeared in March and April 1967, but the latter was mistakenly also dated March in the indicia. Science Fantasy, which by this time had been retitled SF Impulse, was not continued but was merged with New Worlds as of the first Gold Star issue, though nothing of SF Impulse's design or content was visible in New Worlds.

=== Arts Council ===
	Spring			Summer			Autumn			Winter		
	Jan	Feb	Mar	Apr	May	Jun	Jul	Aug	Sep	Oct	Nov	Dec
1968		179	180	181			182			183	184	185
1969	186	187	188	189	190	191	192	193	194		195	196
1970	197	198	199	200								
1971			201						#1			#2
1972			#3			#4						
1973	#5								#6			
1974												#7
1975			#8								#9	
1976								#10				
1977												
1978			212			213					214	
1979			215						216			
Issues of New Worlds from 1968 to 1979, showing issue number. From; 1971 to 1976 New Worlds was a paperback anthology titled New Worlds; Quarterly, numbered from 1 to 10. Underlining indicates that the magazine was titled with the season (e.g. "Spring 1978") for that issue. The colours identify the editors for each issue: Michael Moorcock Langdon Jones Charles Platt; Charles Platt & R. Glyn Jones Graham Hall & Graham Charnock; Michael Moorcock & Charles Platt Hilary Bailey & Charles Platt; Hilary Bailey David Britton

The partnership Warburton and Moorcock formed to continue New Worlds was named Magnelist Publications. Moorcock and Warburton reviewed the dummy issue Moorcock had put together when he first became editor, and Warburton agreed to switch to the larger format. The first issue from Magnelist appeared in July 1967, beginning a regular monthly schedule. Moorcock remained as editor with Langdon Jones as his assistant, and Charles Platt became the layout designer. Warburton ceased his involvement after the November issue, but the magazine was again saved, this time by Sylvester Stein of Stonehart Publications. (Note: Moorcock recalls that Stein probably heard of New Worlds through a mention in The Times Diary.)

Delays led to a skipped month, with the December 1967 and January 1968 issues being combined into one, but a monthly schedule returned thereafter. The March 1968 issue contained the third instalment of Norman Spinrad's novel Bug Jack Barron, which included some fairly explicit sex scenes. A member of parliament complained in the House of Commons that the Arts Council was "sponsoring filth"; (Note: Moorcock recorded in 1979 that he never found out what the story was that had caused the complaints. Ashley suggests it may have been Spinrad's novel, but that other material in the issue, such as a story by Langdon Jones in which a girl argues with Christ on the cross, may also have given offence.) and soon W.H. Smith and John Menzies, the two main retail outlets for magazines in the UK, withdrew the magazine from sale. The complaints came at the time when the Arts Council was considering renewing the grant for another year, and it appeared for a while that New Worlds would have to cease publication, but eventually the grant was renewed. With money from advertising, and a substantial contribution from Moorcock himself, the magazine was able to survive.

The loss of revenue caused by the withdrawal from sale of the March 1968 issue was exacerbated by a temporary ban on the magazine in South Africa, New Zealand and Australia, and by John Menzies' subsequent decision not to stock New Worlds. W.H. Smith left it to their individual branch managers to decide whether or not to carry the magazine. (Note: Moorcock's opinion was that this was "hypocrisy", and that W.H. Smith subsequently "put every obstacle in our path".) Stonehart were unhappy with developments and refused to pay the printers, who in turn withheld the printed copies. The Arts Council money had been intended for the contributors, but a disagreement over the grant led to Stonehart's refusal to pay them as well. Some negative coverage appeared in the press as a consequence of the distribution ban. The grant was eventually renewed, but by late that year Moorcock paid contributors and printing bills and severed relations with Stein and Stonehart after the July 1968 issue and switched distributors to independent Moore Harness (Time Out, Private Eye).

Without reliable distribution at the leading newsagents, New Worlds had to rely on unconventional distribution and subscriptions. The magazine was not especially profitable, and since Moorcock had not formed a company to publish it, he was personally responsible for its costs. To bring in cash he had been writing fantasy novels at a very rapid rate since early 1968, and from early 1969 the editorial work was given to various others, primarily Charles Platt and Langdon Jones. A regular monthly schedule was adhered to from January until July 1969, at which point came another financial blow when it was discovered that half of the print run of 20,000 was being held back by the distributors. Moorcock attempted to regroup by reducing the number of pages in each issue, and because he was again forced to write as much as he could to earn enough to pay New Worlds's bills, he turned over almost all editorial duties to Charles Platt, though others involved with the magazine also took turns at the editorial work over the next few issues. Moorcock was £3,000 in debt, and in combination with the Arts Council's decision not to renew their grant he found himself with no option but to cease publication on a monthly schedule and arrange a quarterly schedule in paperback format published by Sphere Books. The April 1970 issue, the 200th, was the last that went out to the distributors; one more issue was prepared and posted to subscribers as the 'Special Good Taste Issue' the following March.

=== Later incarnations ===
When Moorcock realised that the magazine would have to fold, he made arrangements with Sphere Books to continue New Worlds as a quarterly paperback anthology series. Sphere produced eight issues, although the quarterly schedule was not adhered to after the fourth issue; the eighth issue appeared in 1975. Six issues were reprinted in the US. The early issues did well financially, with about 25,000 copies sold, not counting US sales. Moorcock turned over the editorship to Charles Platt with the sixth volume, and to Hilary Bailey thereafter, to give himself more time to devote to his own writing: he also commented that by this time "I no longer had my editorial touch (I couldn't read sf at all)". Sphere cancelled the series after two more issues; it was briefly taken over by Corgi Books, but sales were weak and Corgi dropped the series with New Worlds 10 in 1976, although according to Moorcock he and Bailey decided to end the series when they got into disagreements with Corgi. In the US Berkley Books published volumes 1 through 4, and when they dropped the series Platt, who was a consulting editor at Avon Books, reprinted two further volumes, number 6 and 7 of the UK series. (Note: As a result the US editions numbered 5 and 6 correspond to volumes 6 and 7 of the UK edition.)

In 1978 the magazine was revived by Moorcock again, this time in a fanzine format. Four more issues appeared, professionally printed and with various editors, between Spring 1978 and September 1979. There followed a gap until 1991, when New Worlds again reappeared as a paperback anthology series, this time edited by David S. Garnett. Four volumes appeared between 1991 and 1994, published by Victor Gollancz. Moorcock edited a fiftieth anniversary issue in 1996, and Garnett subsequently edited one more issue of the anthology. Together with the earlier fanzine, magazine and anthology versions, these took the issue numbering from 212 through to 222.

In 2021 the magazine was revived once again by Nick Gevers and Peter Crowther at PS Publishing as an anthology series with paperback and limited signed hardcover editions.

== Contents and reception ==
=== Carnell ===
The lead story of the first issue of New Worlds was Maurice Hugi's "The Mill of the Gods". John Russell Fearn contributed four stories, under his own name and three pseudonyms, and William Temple provided "The Three Pylons", a fantasy which turned out to be the most popular story in the issue. Science fiction historian Mike Ashley regards the next two issues as an improvement on the first; the second issue contained John Wyndham's "The Living Lies", under his "John Beynon" alias, and the third contained "Inheritance", an early story by Arthur C. Clarke. Wyndham's story, about hostility and bigotry shown by settlers on Venus to the Venusian natives, was reprinted in Other Worlds in 1950, while "Inheritance" later appeared in Astounding Science Fiction.

The acquisition of Nova Publications by Maclaren in 1954 gave New Worlds the stability to establish itself as a leading magazine. Ashley describes the period from 1954 to 1960 as a "Golden Age" for New Worlds. Carnell bought J. G. Ballard's first sale, "Escapement", which appeared in the December 1956 New Worlds; Ballard went on to become a significant figure in the genre in the 1960s. Ballard was grateful to Carnell for the support he provided Ballard in the late 1950s. Much of Ballard's work appeared in New Worlds and Science Fantasy, and Ballard later recalled that Carnell "recognized what I was on about from a very early stage and he encouraged me to go on writing in my own way." Carnell also published much of Brian Aldiss's early work in Science Fantasy and New Worlds. John Brunner, later to become one of the most successful British science fiction writers, appeared regularly in the Nova magazines, starting with "Visitors' Book" in the April 1955 New Worlds. James White began publishing with "Assisted Passage" in the January 1953 New Worlds, and in 1957 began his popular Sector General series, about a hospital for aliens, with "Sector General" in the November 1957 issue. John Wyndham, who was already well known outside the genre for works such as The Day of the Triffids, began a series about the Troons, a space-going family, with "For All the Night" in the April 1958 issue. Arthur C. Clarke, another successful British sf writer of the period, wrote relatively few short stories for the British market, but published "Who's There" in the November 1958 New Worlds. Colin Kapp began his popular "Unorthodox Engineers" series with "The Railways up on Cannis", in October 1959. Other less well-known writers who were prolific during the late 1950s included J. T. McIntosh, Kenneth Bulmer, and E. C. Tubb.

New Worlds has been credited with "shap[ing] the way science fiction developed" as a genre. It "did the most" of any magazine for British science fiction, helping to revive a nationalist style of speculative fiction in the 1950s; Roger Luckhurst called it "the most important British sf journal". Particularly influential were Clarke's "Guardian Angel" (published in 1950), and the work of Brian Aldiss, John Brunner and J. G. Ballard. Mike Ashley argued that New Worlds and Science-Fantasy were "the bedrock of high-quality science fiction in Britain". Female readership for the magazine was between 5 and 15 percent, according to surveys conducted during the 1950s. The magazine became increasingly popular among a younger demographic: readers 19 and under made up 5 percent of total readership in 1954, 18 percent in 1958, and 31 percent in 1963. The same polls also showed an increase in the number of science and technology workers reading the magazine during that period. Among the best artists of this period were Brian Lewis, Gordon Hutchings, and Gerard Quinn, whose art is regarded by Ashley as comparable in style to Virgil Finlay's work. In 1957 Carnell stopped using interior art, saying that "art work in the digest-size magazines is as out-of-date as a coal fire".

In Ashley's view, the quality of New Worlds began to drop in the early 1960s. It still ran popular series such as White's Sector General stories, and printed some well-received stories such as Harry Harrison's "The Streets of Ashkelon", about a clash between an atheist (the protagonist) and a priest, on another planet. Because of the subject matter, it took six years for Harrison to find an editor willing to accept the story; when Aldiss bought it for an anthology, Carnell agreed to print it in New Worlds, where it appeared in September 1962. J.G. Ballard continued to publish in New Worlds, but was now sending his more conventional stories to the US magazines, and submitting his more experimental pieces to Carnell. Examples from 1961 to 1964 include "The Overloaded Man", "The Subliminal Man", "End-Game", and "The Terminal Beach", with themes of psychological stress, and changes to the nature of perception and of reality.

=== Moorcock ===
When Nova made the decision to close down New Worlds in 1963, Moorcock and Ballard considered publishing a new magazine that would be willing, as Carnell had been, to publish experimental material. Moorcock assembled a dummy issue, and later described his intentions: "It would be on art paper, to take good quality illustrations; it would be the size of, say, Playboy so that it would get good display space on the newsstands; it would specialise in experimental work by writers like [William] Burroughs and [Eduardo] Paolozzi, but it would be 'popular', it would seek to publicise such experimenters; it would publish all those writers who had become demoralised by a lack of sympathetic publishers and by baffled critics; it would attempt a cross-fertilization of popular sf, science and the work of the literary and artistic avant garde." Moorcock also wrote a letter to Carnell setting out his thoughts on what science fiction needed: "Editors who are willing to take a risk on a story and run it even though this may bring criticism on their heads." The letter was published in the final Nova Publications issue, which also carried the announcement that Moorcock would be taking over from Carnell as editor of New Worlds, though Moorcock had been unaware he would be considered for the post when he wrote his letter.

Moorcock's first issue, dated May/June 1964, bore a cover by James Cawthorn illustrating the first instalment of Ballard's novella "Equinox"; Ballard also contributed a book review of William Burroughs' Dead Fingers Talk, and stories by Brian Aldiss, Barrington Bayley, and John Brunner completed the issue. Moorcock's editorial included a quote from a radio interview with William Burroughs to the effect that "If writers are to describe the advanced techniques of the Space Age, they must invent writing techniques equally advanced in order properly to deal with them." Within the first few issues, Moorcock printed stories intended to demonstrate his editorial goals. The most controversial of these was Langdon Jones' "I Remember, Anita ...", which appeared in the September/October 1964 issue; the story contained sex scenes that led to arguments in the magazine's letter column, and some regular subscribers abandoned the magazines, though overall circulation increased.

Moorcock contributed a substantial amount of material, under his own name and under pseudonyms such as James Colvin; some of these stories were fairly traditional, but contributions such as the Jerry Cornelius stories, which began with "Preliminary Data" in the August 1965 issue, were much more experimental. He also printed his novella "Behold the Man" in the September 1966 issue; the story, about a time traveller who returns to the time of Christ, won him a Nebula Award the following year. Ballard also began to write some of his most controversial stories, including "You: Coma: Marilyn Monroe" in the June 1966 issue, and "The Assassination of John Fitzgerald Kennedy Considered as a Downhill Motor Race", in March 1967; both had been previously published in Ambit, a literary magazine, in 1966.

Many writers now found New Worlds to be a market in which they could publish experimental material. Charles Platt, David I. Masson, and Barrington Bayley were among the British writers in this group, and Moorcock also attracted work from US writers such as John Sladek, Roger Zelazny and Thomas M. Disch. Zelazny's contributions included "For a Breath I Tarry" in March 1966, and Disch published several short stories and the novel Echo Round His Bones, which was serialized starting in the December 1966 and January 1967 issues. Disch commented that he had been unable to find a publisher for the novel in the US.

In the mid-1960s, the term "New Wave" began to be applied to the more experimental work that Moorcock was publishing, and New Worlds was soon regarded as the leading publication in the New Wave movement. In addition to the experimental material, Moorcock attempted to keep the existing readership happy by publishing more traditional science fiction; in the words of sf historian Colin Greenland, he "changed the contents of the magazine much more slowly than he pretended to". Traditional sf stories bought by Moorcock include Vernor Vinge's first story, "Apartness", which appeared in June 1965; he also printed material from Bob Shaw, early stories by Terry Pratchett, and, in March 1965, Arthur C. Clarke's "Sunjammer".

=== Arts Council and after ===
When Moorcock took over publication of New Worlds from Roberts & Vinter he changed the format from digest to a larger size with good quality paper that allowed better use of artwork. The first issue in this format, July 1967, contained part one of Disch's Camp Concentration, written for the magazine and refused by its American publisher because of the explicit language used by the protagonist. Disch afterwards recalled that some of the experimental language in the book was written in the knowledge that New Worlds was available as a market for unconventional fiction. Other new writers who appeared in the magazine include M. John Harrison and Robert Holdstock, who both appeared in the November 1968 issue, and Michael Butterworth whose work first appeared in the May 1966 edition. The December 1968 issue included Samuel R. Delany's "Time Considered as a Helix of Semi-Precious Stones", and Harlan Ellison's "A Boy and His Dog" appeared in April 1969; Ellison won a Nebula Award, and Delany both a Nebula and a Hugo, though it was not until the stories were reprinted in book form that they were widely noticed.

The July 1967 issue of New Worlds contained Pamela Zoline's first story, "The Heat Death of the Universe", which used entropy, a frequent theme in New Worlds, as a metaphor. The story is one of the best examples of the new approach Moorcock was taking with the magazine: in the words of critic Edward James, the goal was to "use science-fictional and scientific language and imagery to describe perfectly 'ordinary' scenes of life, and by doing so produce altered perceptions of reality in the reader". "Inner space", a term originally coined by J.B. Priestley, was also used to describe the focus of the stories Moorcock printed, in contrast to traditional science fiction's focus on outer space, and James regards the term as "the watchword of the British New Wave, and the shibboleth by which one recognized those who had abandoned Gernsback and Campbell." The methods and interests of these writers were quite different from those of traditional science fiction: the concern was with internal rather than external reality, and experimental techniques, unusual juxtapositions of material, and a focus on psychological concerns were the norm.

With the switch to anthology format, some of the more experimental material disappeared. In his editorials, Moorcock made it clear that he did not want to exclude traditional sf stories; he wanted to eliminate the genre boundaries completely, and have science fiction treated as part of the mainstream of fiction. The quarterlies were labelled as science fiction since Sphere knew that would increase sales. The stories printed in the anthologies were generally downbeat. New writers who appeared for the first time in the quarterly anthology series included Marta Randall (under the name Marta Bergstrasser), Eleanor Arnason, Geoff Ryman, and Rachel Pollack (as Richard A. Pollack).

Issue 212 reprinted a piece written by Moorcock and M. John Harrison that was a spoof issue of The Guardian; it had been published in Frendz, an underground paper, in 1971. The next two issues also contained mock newspaper stories; issue 215 contained more conventional material, including a Jerry Cornelius story written by Charles Partington. Issue 216, the last of the late 1970s issues, reintroduced the mock news stories. The 1990s anthology series did not try to recapture the atmosphere or style of the 1960s or 1970s New Worlds. It contained some well-received material, including stories by Moorcock, Paul Di Filippo, and Ian McDonald, but was financially unsuccessful. The current revival from PS Publishing began in 2021.

== New Worlds and the "New Wave" ==
New Worlds' greatest influence on science fiction came in the 1960s, with the "New Wave" that began with Moorcock's polemical editorials. Moorcock asserted in 1965 that a writer of good sf "can learn from his predecessors, but he should not imitate them"; and he was soon publishing stories that were quite different in technique and style from anything that had appeared before, not just in New Worlds itself, but in any of the sf magazines. Moorcock's goal was to use the magazine to "define a new avant-garde role" for the genre. New Worlds thus became the "ideological center of the [New Wave] movement to rejuvenate conjectural literature".

The term "New Wave" did not always meet with approval among those who were regarded as part of it (this included Moorcock, who denied that he was creating a movement). Brian Aldiss, for example, wrote to Judith Merril in 1966 that he suspected the term was "a journalistic invention of yours and Mike Moorcock's", and added "I feel I am no part of the New Wave; I was here before 'em, and by God I mean to be here after they've gone (still writing bloody science fiction)!" Merril was an important advocate for New Worlds and the New Wave, and popularized the latter in her anthology England Swings SF, which appeared in 1968; she spent almost a year in London, living near Moorcock, when researching the anthology in 1966–1967. Merril and writer Christopher Priest were among those who used the term "New Wave" to describe the work being done in New Worlds, but Aldiss was not the only writer to object to the term, and it never received a generally accepted definition. Critic Brian Attebery characterizes it as a "disruptive, existentially fraught and formally daring" style; Peter Nicholls hesitates to define it but comments that "perhaps the fundamental element was the belief that sf could and should be taken seriously as literature". In a 1967 interview, Ballard, one of the writers most closely associated with the New Wave, described modern US sf as extrovert and optimistic, and contrasted it with "the new science fiction, that other people apart from myself are now beginning to write", which he saw as "introverted, possibly pessimistic rather than optimistic, much less certain of its own territory."

Whatever the exact definition of the term, between 1964 and 1966, New Worlds was at the forefront of the New Wave movement. Two guest editorials in 1962 and 1963 ("Which way to Inner Space?" by Ballard and "Play with Feeling" by Moorcock) were arguably the "first glimmerings" of New Wave ideas in sf magazines. Latham suggests that these were "the first volleys in the polemical offensive they would launch once [Moorcock] gained control of the magazine and installed [Ballard] as his resident visionary". The response to the New Wave from critics and sf fans was varied. Christopher Priest called New Worlds a "New Wave prozine", but lauded the talents of its writers and its experimental stories (with the exception of Ballard's The Crystal World, which he deemed "tedious and wearying"). Ian McAuley suggested the magazine's editors were "plugging the 'inner-space' jazz for all its [sic] worth". Mike Ashley argued that New Worlds was instrumental in promoting authors who would not otherwise have been published (a suggestion with which Bould and Butler concur). Ballard was a particular focus of both praise and vehement criticism, and was vigorously defended by Moorcock. Peter Weston took an "even-handed approach" by praising New Worlds in Speculation editorials, in contrast with his largely negative columnists.

Beginning in 1966, US fanzines began responding to New Worlds and its detractors, and the debate spread to the professional US magazines as well. Merril praised Disch and Ballard's contributions to New Worlds in The Magazine of Fantasy and Science Fiction; Algis Budrys in Galaxy rebutted her viewpoint and condemned both authors. Frederik Pohl called New Worlds "damned dull", advocating a return to adventure stories. American science fiction authors "were finding it increasingly difficult to avoid partisan alignments in the developing New Wave war" because of the preponderance of columns and letters in American magazines both for and against New Worlds and New Wave in general. Latham suggests that "the New Worlds editorial conclave was actively working within fandom to counteract the Old Guard assaults".

By the end of the 1960s, New Worlds and the New Wave's connection to and influence on science fiction was becoming tenuous. In the August 1969 issue, Platt asserted that "New Worlds is not a science-fiction magazine", and Moorcock likened it to an avant-garde and experimental literary review. The sf world had lost interest in New Worlds, and it had become, in Ashley's words, "a revolution running out of energy". In the longer term it proved influential, despite the lack of wide acceptance at the time: in the words of sf historian Brian Stableford, "the paths beaten by the New Worlds writers are now much more generally in use". (Note: This quote is in Stableford's article on New Worlds in the 1979 first edition of the Science Fiction Encyclopedia, and remains unchanged in the current online version, which is credited to Stableford, Peter Nicholls, and Mike Ashley.)

== Bibliographic details ==
The following table shows the editorial succession at New Worlds, indicates which issues appeared from which publisher, and gives the format, page count and price of each issue: Dates in [square brackets] indicate the approximate date that an issue was released in cases where a month did not appear on the magazine.

Issues	Dates	Editor	Publisher	Format	Page count	Price
1–2	[July] 1946 – [October] 1946	John Carnell	Pendulum Publications, London	Pulp	64	2/-
3	[October] 1947	John Carnell	Pendulum Publications, London	Pulp	64	1/6
4	[April] 1949 – [April] 1949	John Carnell	Nova Publications, London	Large digest	88	1/6
5–20	[September] 1949 – March 1953	John Carnell	Nova Publications, London	Large digest	96	1/6
21–31	June 1953 – January 1955	John Carnell	Nova Publications, London	Digest	128	1/6
32–85	February 1955 – July 1959	John Carnell	Nova Publications, London	Digest	128	2/-
86	August/September 1959	John Carnell	Nova Publications, London	Digest	112	2/-
87–88	October 1959 – November 1959	John Carnell	Nova Publications, London	Digest	128	2/-
89–133	August 1963 – April 1964	John Carnell	Nova Publications, London	Digest	128	2/6
134–141	September 1963 – April 1964	John Carnell	Nova Publications, London	Digest	128	3/-
142–159	May/June 1964 – February 1966	Michael Moorcock	Roberts & Vinter, Ltd, London	Paperback	128	2/6
160–170	March 1966 – January 1967	Michael Moorcock	Roberts & Vinter, Ltd, London	Paperback	160	3/6
171–172	March 1967 – April 1967	Michael Moorcock	Gold Star Publications, London	Paperback	128	3/6
173–176	July 1967 – October 1967	Michael Moorcock	Moorcock/Magnelist Publications, London	Slick	64	3/6
177	November 1967	Michael Moorcock	Moorcock/Magnelist Publications, London	Slick	64	5/-
178–182	December 1967/January 1968 – July 1968	Michael Moorcock	Moorcock/Stonehart Publications, London	Slick	64	5/-
183–188	October 1968 – March 1969	Michael Moorcock	Moorcock privately as New Worlds Publishing, London	Slick	64	5/-
189–192	April 1969 – July 1969	Langdon Jones	Moorcock privately as New Worlds Publishing, London	Slick	64	5/-
193	August 1969	Charles Platt	Moorcock privately as New Worlds Publishing, London	Slick	32	3/6
194	September/October 1969	Michael Moorcock	Moorcock privately as New Worlds Publishing, London	Slick	32	3/6
195	November 1969	Charles Platt & R. Glyn Jones	Moorcock privately as New Worlds Publishing, London	Slick	32	3/6
196	December 1969	Graham Hall & Graham Charnock	Moorcock privately as New Worlds Publishing, London	Slick	32	3/6
197–200	January 1970 – April 1970	Charles Platt	Moorcock privately as New Worlds Publishing, London	Slick	32	3/6
201	March 1971	Michael Moorcock	Moorcock privately as New Worlds Publishing, London	A4	20	25p
202	[September] 1971	Michael Moorcock	Sphere Books, London	Paperback	176	30p
203	[December] 1971	Michael Moorcock	Sphere Books, London	Paperback	192	30p
204	[March] 1972	Michael Moorcock	Sphere Books, London	Paperback	208	30p
205	[June] 1972	Michael Moorcock	Sphere Books, London	Paperback	224	35p
206	[January] 1973	Michael Moorcock	Sphere Books, London	Paperback	280	40p
207	[September] 1973	Michael Moorcock	Sphere Books, London	Paperback	272	40p
208	[December] 1974	Hilary Bailey & Charles Platt	Sphere Books, London	Paperback	216	50p
209	[March] 1975	Hilary Bailey	Sphere Books, London	Paperback	224	50p
210	[November] 1975	Hilary Bailey	Corgi Books, London	Paperback	224	50p
211	[August] 1976	Hilary Bailey	Corgi Books, London	Paperback	240	60p
212	Spring 1978	Michael Moorcock	Michael Moorcock	A4	8	Free
213	Summer 1978	Michael Moorcock	Michael Moorcock	A4	32	40p
214	Winter 1978	Michael Moorcock	Michael Moorcock	A4	56	75p
215	Spring 1979	David Britton & Michael Butterworth	David Britton & Michael Butterworth	A4	48	£1.00
216	September 1979	Charles Platt	Charles Platt	A4	44	£1.00
217	1991	David Garnett	Gollancz, London	Paperback	267	£4.99
218	1992	David Garnett	Gollancz, London	Paperback	293	£5.99
219	1993	David Garnett	Gollancz, London	Paperback	219	£6.99
220	1994	David Garnett	Gollancz, London	Paperback	224	£6.99
221	Winter 1996	Michael Moorcock	Michael Moorcock	A4	64	£10.00
222	1997	David Garnett	White Wolf, Stone Mountain GA	Paperback	357	$12.99
223	2021	Nick Gevers & Peter Crowther	PS Publishing	Paperback and signed, limited hardback	360	£15.99 / £59.99

There were US reprints of six of the New Worlds Quarterly anthology series. The first four were published by Berkley Books; Avon Books picked up two more of the series after Berkley dropped it, but since the fifth volume had been missed by that time, Avon retitled volumes 6 and 7 as New Worlds Quarterly 5 and New Worlds Quarterly 6.

=== US editions ===
A US reprint edition of New Worlds ran briefly in 1960, published by Great American Publications, who at the time were the publishers of Fantastic Universe, edited by Hans Stefan Santesson. The first issue appeared in March 1960; it omitted Carnell's name, and credited Santesson as editor. Although the fiction consisted entirely of reprints, with all but one story coming from the British New Worlds, this was not declared to the reader. Carnell was unhappy with the results of this attempt to break into the US market, but in the event Great American collapsed later that year and only five issues appeared, on a monthly schedule from March to July. The contents of the issues did not correspond to specific British issues: the majority were taken from New Worlds but one story was reprinted from Nova's edition of Science Fiction Adventures, and three were taken from Fantastic Universe, which had ceased publication with its March 1960 issue.

Subsequently the British edition was released in the US essentially unchanged, with a cover date delayed by one month, starting with issue 99 (October 1960).

=== Anthologies ===
Several anthologies of stories from New Worlds have been published, including:

Year	Editor	Title
1955	John Carnell	The Best from New Worlds Science Fiction
1964	John Carnell	Lambda I and Other Stories
1965	Michael Moorcock	The Best of New Worlds
1967	Michael Moorcock	The Best S.F. Stories from New Worlds
1968	Michael Moorcock	The Best Stories from New Worlds 2
1968	Michael Moorcock	The Best S.F. Stories from New Worlds 3
1969	Michael Moorcock	The Best S.F. Stories from New Worlds 4
1969	Michael Moorcock	The Best S.F. Stories from New Worlds 5
1970	Michael Moorcock	The Best S.F. Stories from New Worlds 6
1971	Michael Moorcock	The Best S.F. Stories from New Worlds 7
1974	Michael Moorcock	The Best S.F. Stories from New Worlds 8
1983	Michael Moorcock	New Worlds: An Anthology

== Sources ==
- Ashley, Mike (2000). The Time Machines: The Story of the Science-Fiction Pulp Magazines from the beginning to 1950. Liverpool: Liverpool University Press. ISBN 978-0-85323-855-3.
- Ashley, Mike (2005). Transformations: The Story of the Science Fiction Magazines from 1950 to 1970. Liverpool: Liverpool University Press. ISBN 978-0-85323-779-2.
- Ashley, Mike (2007). Gateways to Forever: The Story of the Science-Fiction Magazines from 1970 to 1980. Liverpool: Liverpool University Press. ISBN 978-1-84631-003-4.
- Bould, Mark; Butler, Andrew, eds. (2010). Fifty Key Figures in Science Fiction. Abingdon, Oxfordshire, UK: Routledge. ISBN 978-0-415-43950-3.
- Clute, John; Nicholls, Peter (1993). The Encyclopedia of Science Fiction. New York: St Martin's Press. ISBN 978-0-312-09618-2.
- Greenland, Colin (1983). The Entropy Exhibition: Michael Moorcock and the British 'New Wave' in Science Fiction. London: Routledge & Kegan Paul. ISBN 978-0-7100-9310-3.
- Harbottle, Philip; Holland, Stephen (1992). Vultures of the Void. San Bernardino, California: Borgo Press. ISBN 978-0-89370-415-5.
- Holdstock, Robert, ed. (1978). Encyclopedia of Science Fiction. London: Octopus Books. ISBN 978-0-7064-0756-3.
- James, Edward (1994). Science Fiction in the 20th Century. Oxford, Oxfordshire: Opus. ISBN 978-0-19-289244-7.
- James, Edward; Mendlesohn, Farah, eds. (2003). The Cambridge Companion to Science Fiction. Cambridge, Cambridgeshire: Cambridge University Press. ISBN 978-0-521-01657-5.
- Luckhurst, Roger (2005). Science Fiction. Cambridge, Cambridgeshire: Polity Press. ISBN 978-0-7456-2893-6.
- Merril, Judith; Pohl-Weary, Emily (2002). Better to Have Loved. Toronto: Between the Lines. ISBN 978-1-896357-57-7.
- Moorcock, Michael, ed. (1983). New Worlds: An Anthology. London: Flamingo. ISBN 978-0-00-654003-8.
- Nicholls, Peter (1981). The Encyclopedia of Science Fiction. Frogmore, St. Albans, Hertfordshire, UK: Granada. ISBN 978-0-586-05380-5.
- Seed, David, ed. (2005). A Companion to Science Fiction. Oxford, UK: Blackwell Publishing. ISBN 978-1-4051-1218-5.
- Stableford, Brian (2004). Historical Dictionary of Science Fiction Literature. Lanham, Maryland: Scarecrow Press. ISBN 978-0-8108-4938-9.
- Tymn, Marshall B.; Ashley, Mike (1988). Science Fiction, Fantasy and Weird Fiction Magazines. Westport, Connecticut: Greenwood Press. ISBN 978-0-313-21221-5.
