= Panther Books =

British publishing house

A Panther Book

Panther Books Ltd was a British publishing house especially active in the 1950s, 1960s and 1970s, specialising in paperback fiction.

== Company history ==
It was established in May 1952 by Hamilton & Co. (Stafford) Ltd. and titles carried the line "A Panther Book" or "Panther Science Fiction" on the cover. Science fiction was one of its major genres; its titles included Ray Bradbury's The Golden Apples of the Sun and Asimov's Foundation Trilogy. In 1954, Gordon Landsborough was employed as editor and started improving the quality of the imprint. Instead of publishing original genre novels in paperback and hardback, Panther Books became a reprint publisher, doing paperback reprints of best-selling hardcover novels from other publishers. The quality of the cover art was improved and the list expanded to include non-fiction titles and fiction titles by internationally known, best-selling writers.

By April 1966, books published under the Panther name indicate that the business was based at 108 Brompton Road, London, S.W.5. However, records of the tumultuous process of mergers and acquisitions in the publishing industry show that by 1968, Granada Group Ltd had acquired a number of publishers who became subsidiary companies of Granada Publishing Ltd. These included, among others, Panther Books Ltd, and thus Panther Science Fiction became a Granada imprint.

In 1983, Granada sold the publishing side of its business to the Scottish publishers William Collins, Sons & Co, based in Glasgow.

In 1989, William Collins Sons & Co merged with the American publishers Harper & Row, located in New York, to form HarperCollins, the British side of the company being managed through HarperCollins Publishers Ltd. HarperCollins Publishers continued to trade. As of January 2020, the head office is at Bishopbriggs, Glasgow, employing about 500 people.

== Sources ==
- Records of Granada Publishing Ltd, Glasgow University Archives Service
- Records of William Collins, Sons and Co Ltd, Glasgow University Archives Service
- Crash by J.G. Ballard (Triad / Panther Books, 1985) at fontinuse.com
- Pulp Friday: The Man With the Brown Paper Face, pulpcurry.com - discussion of Panther's book cover design
- Out of Space and Time: Books by Clark Ashton Smith, at strangelyperfect.tv - designer of cover art for Panther Books
