= History of UK science fiction and fantasy magazines to 1965 =

UK science fiction magazine history to 1965

Cover of the August 1934 issue of Amazing Stories, imported to the UK with a price sticker from the distributor, Atlas Publishing

Science fiction appeared regularly in UK magazines in the late 19th century, but it was not until 1934 that the first magazine devoted solely to science fiction was launched in the UK. This was Scoops, a weekly aimed at a juvenile audience; it lasted only a few months. In the late 1930s two pulp magazines, Fantasy and Tales of Wonder, were launched, but World War II brought paper shortages, and only a few issues appeared. Contributors included John Wyndham and Arthur C. Clarke. Only publisher Gerald Swan, who had stockpiled magazines before the war, issued any new science fiction titles over the next few years.

Paper rationing continued for several years after the end of the war, and as the demand for new reading material exceeded the supply publishers often produced shoddy material, paying very low rates to writers, since they knew almost anything they printed would sell well. New Worlds, edited by E. J. Carnell, was an exception to this rule: it was started in 1946 by a group of science fiction writers and fans that included Wyndham, Carnell, and Walter Gillings. The publisher, Pendulum Publications, went bankrupt in 1947, but a group of eight of the magazine's backers formed Nova Publications to continue the magazine. In 1950 a second title, Science Fantasy, was added, edited by Gillings, but after two issues Carnell took over as editor. A third Nova title, Science Fiction Adventures, was started in 1958. In the early 1960s New Worlds and Science Fantasy were taken over by Roberts & Vinter, a paperback publisher: Science Fantasy ceased publication in 1967, but New Worlds continued for several decades. New Worlds published many of the top British and American science fiction writers of its day, including J. G. Ballard, James White, Michael Moorcock, Cyril Kornbluth, Theodore Sturgeon and Philip K. Dick.

John Spencer was one of the publishers that printed low-quality material, and between 1950 and 1954 they published dozens of science fiction magazine issues under four different titles. The contents were "the worst science fiction ever published", according to Mike Ashley, a historian of science fiction. Of somewhat better quality was Authentic Science Fiction, which appeared in 1951 from Hamilton & Co, another high-volume low-quality publisher. Its first editor, Gordon Landsborough, was able to persuade Hamilton to invest a little more money and effort in the magazine and it became more respectable over its six-year run. In 1952 Peter Hamilton, a young Scot, launched Nebula Science Fiction using his parents' printing business as the magazine's printer. He bought the first sales of Robert Silverberg, Bob Shaw, and Brian Aldiss, and gradually raised his pay rates to be competitive even with the US markets. The result was a well-liked and successful magazine, eventually brought down by business circumstances that made Nebula's overseas subscriptions unsustainable.

Several publishers, including Atlas Publications, Thorpe & Porter, and Pembertons, reprinted British versions of the US science fiction and fantasy pulps. Many only lasted for one or two issues, but some were more successful: Atlas's British edition of Astounding Science Fiction lasted for 222 issues and 14 years, and the Thorpe & Porter edition of Galaxy Science Fiction ran for nine years, from 1953 to 1962, with 94 issues.

== Early and pre-war magazines ==
By the end of the 19th century, British story papers such as The Boy's Own Paper and popular fiction magazines such as The Strand were flourishing. Science fiction, by authors such as H. G. Wells, Arthur Conan Doyle and George Griffith, was becoming popular, though it shared space in the magazines with other genres such as adventure and mystery stories. During the 1910s, American pulp magazine titles that specialized in particular genres, such as Detective Story Magazine and Western Story Magazine, began to appear. In the UK the first single-genre magazines were not launched until 1922, with Adventure-Story Magazine from Hutchinson, followed in 1923 by Mystery-Story Magazine from the same publisher. An exception was the 1919 issue of Pears' Annual, which was themed around predicting the state of the world in 50 years' time, and included both articles and fiction. This has sometimes been considered an example of an early science fiction magazine.

The first science fiction (sf) magazine, Amazing Stories, was launched in the US in 1926, and issues of this and later sf magazines were imported into the UK, drawing the attention of British writers. By the mid-1930s there were several regular British contributors to the US science fiction pulps, including John Wyndham and John Russell Fearn. Stories from the US magazines were occasionally reprinted in Britain, The Strand, Pearson's, and elsewhere, and two anthology series published some science fiction: the Not at Night series, which ran from 1925 to 1936, and the Creeps series, from 1932 to the mid-1930s. These were primarily horror and included many reprints, but both also printed original work by British authors.

=== Scoops ===
The boys' papers, such as Chums, did print some science fiction, but this reinforced an impression that sf was a genre more suited to younger readers than to adults, and so it was not surprising that the first British magazine to focus on science fiction was also targeted at boys. This was Scoops, published weekly by C. A. Pearson and edited by Haydn Dimmock. The first issue was dated 10 February 1934. The fiction was of poor quality, mostly contributed anonymously by writers of boys' adventure fiction. Dimmock was initially unaware that there was a market for adult science fiction but soon began receiving story submissions from sf writers such as Fearn and Maurice Hugi. The magazine began to include advertisements for men's items such as shaving mirrors and cigarette holders, as well as more sophisticated stories, as Dimmock tried to address this new audience; sf magazine historian Mike Ashley suggests the result was a mixture that could not please either the younger readers or science fiction aficionados. Sales were poor, and Pearson's closed the magazine down in June, after 20 issues. There was enough British interest in American science fiction for the August 1935 issue of Wonder Stories to devote its letter column to mail from British readers, but when one of those letters suggested that the time was right for a British publisher to start a science fiction title, the editor, Charles Hornig, replied that the failure of Scoops "proved to us and other British publishers that [the UK] is not yet prepared to support a professional science-fiction magazine enough to make it pay for itself".

=== The World's Work and Newnes ===
Although no magazines specializing in science fiction or fantasy were launched over the next three years, one publisher, The World's Work, did produce several issues of sf and fantasy interest. The World's Work had begun publishing "The Master Thriller Series" in 1933, with Tales of the Foreign Legion. These were single pulp magazine issues, each focused on a different genre, such as sea stories or adventure stories. The fourth and sixth in the series, titled Tales of Mystery and Detection and Tales of the Uncanny, included several stories with supernatural themes; they appeared in June and December 1934, respectively. The former led to a spin-off, titled Mystery and Detection, which produced two issues in 1934, followed by seven more on a monthly schedule from April to October 1935. Mystery and Detection reprinted supernatural stories by authors such as Dorothy Sayers, G. K. Chesterton, and Edgar Wallace. This was followed by a second Tales of the Uncanny in the Master Thriller series, appearing as #20 in 1937, and a third issue, outside the Master Thriller series, not long afterwards. It contained a mixture of new and reprint stories about ghosts and other supernatural subjects. The World's Work also published a single issue of Fireside Ghost Stories in 1937, reprinting ghost stories such as Charles Dickens' "The Signalman", and including some original fiction by R. Thurston Hopkins; and a single issue of Ghosts and Goblins in 1938, with contributions from Hopkins and Garnett Radcliffe, among others.

Meanwhile, Newnes, the publisher of The Strand, had decided by 1935 to launch four genre pulp magazines, and to include a science fiction title in the group. T. Stanhope Sprigg was to be the editor of all four titles, but after the first three appeared, in 1935 and 1936, the sf title was delayed. Then in 1937 a British fan, Walter Gillings, who had been working with Sprigg to find stories for the proposed Newnes magazine, persuaded The World's Work to test the market with a single issue of a science fiction magazine, titled Tales of Wonder. Sales were good enough for a second issue to appear in early 1938. This convinced Newnes to finally take the plunge with their own magazine, and the first issue of Fantasy appeared in 1938, with Sprigg as editor. Both these ventures were cut short by World War II: Sprigg went into the Royal Air Force after only three issues of Fantasy, the last one dated June 1939; and although Gillings edited Tales of Wonder from his army camp after he signed up, eventually he was unable to continue, and the last issue appeared in early 1942. Newnes paid good rates for fiction, and consequently Fantasy attracted quality material, by John Wyndham and Eric Frank Russell among others. Gillings bought some stories from British writers for Tales of Wonder, including Wyndham, Russell, and William F. Temple, but he could not find as much domestic material as he needed. To fill out the magazine he reprinted stories from the American magazines, including work by Murray Leinster and Jack Williamson. He also published two science articles by Arthur C. Clarke; these were Clarke's first professional sales.

=== British reprint editions ===
Pulp magazines from the US had been imported since before the first issue of Amazing Stories, but it was not until the end of the 1930s that British reprints of the US magazines began to appear. Atlas Publishing began several reprint titles of science fiction or fantasy interest in 1939: Thrills, which reprinted stories from William Clayton's US pulps, only lasted one issue, and there were two reprint issues of the US pulp Science Fiction, but the reprint versions of Astounding Science Fiction and Unknown were more durable. The Atlas Astounding lasted until 1953, with a total of 222 issues, and the Atlas Unknown produced 41 issues—more than the US original, since the British reprints used fewer stories per issue—and lasted until 1949.

== War years and after ==
=== Gerald Swan ===
In 1938 Gerald Swan, a bookseller, moved into the publishing business. When World War II started he had a stockpile of unsold magazines in warehouses. The introduction of paper rationing during the war meant that, in Ashley's words, he "virtually cornered the magazine market". Swan's magazines covered many genres: the first of fantasy or science fictional interest was Weird Story Magazine, which appeared in August 1940. Two more undated issues appeared around 1946. The undistinguished contents were "for completist collectors only", according to Ashley: contributors included the prolific N. Wesley Firth, along with writers such as A. C. Bailey and Henry Rawle, who appeared in several of Swan's magazines.

Also in 1940, Swan began a series called Yankee Shorts, starting with Yankee Romance, Yankee Mystery, and Yankee Science Fiction in November. A total of 21 appeared by 1942, and another five a couple of years later. Three of the science fiction issues appeared; the stories were mostly by British writers, along with some American reprints. There were also three issues titled Yankee Weird Shorts, two in 1941 and one in 1942, with contents described by Ashley as "featureless vignettes". Two other Swan titles contained fantasy. Occult published two issues: one by 1945 and the other in 1946; and there was a single issue titled Weird Shorts, probably in 1945. Both contained very short vignettes by the same authors who wrote for Swan's other magazines.

=== Post-war magazines ===
Paper rationing continued in force for some time after the war ended, and consequently almost any published fiction would sell well, as the supply was so limited. (Note: Paper restrictions for magazines ended in 1950, and paper rationing overall ended in 1953.) This meant that publishers had an incentive to acquire fiction at the lowest price possible, to increase their margins, so writers in their turn had an incentive to write as fast as possible. The result was a period in which poor-quality fiction swamped the market, both in paperbacks and magazines, across all genres.

Several short-lived magazines appeared not long after the war ended. Benson Herbert's Utopian Publications issued a series of booklets, some of which contained fantasy material. These could be regarded as either magazines or anthologies; the post-war paper restrictions required Utopian to produce them in book form. Titles included two issues of Strange Tales, edited by Gillings, and a single issue each of Strange Love Stories and Thrilling Stories, all in 1946. All three titles included work by well-known American science fiction and fantasy writers, including H. P. Lovecraft, Ray Bradbury, Edmond Hamilton, and Robert Bloch. Gillings independently edited another magazine, titled Fantasy like the pre-war Newnes pulp and published by Temple Bar. He bought enough stories, from writers such as Wyndham, Fearn, Russell, and George Wallis, to fill nine issues, but ongoing paper restrictions convinced him and the publisher to abandon the enterprise after only three issues—one at the end of 1946, and two in 1947. "Technical Error", an early story by Arthur C. Clarke, appeared in the first issue; Gillings had also bought "Loophole" and "Rescue Party" from Clarke, but returned them because of the delays caused by paper rationing. Clarke resold them to US markets; "Loophole", in the April 1946 Astounding Science Fiction, was his first published fiction. A single issue of Outlands appeared in October 1946, edited by Leslie Johnson, a fan who had formed a company with two friends to publish it. The lead story was by John Russell Fearn, and it contained Sydney J. Bounds' first sale, "Strange Portrait". When Johnson discovered that issues were being returned as unsold that had never been distributed for sale, he abandoned the project. Hamilton & Co., a publishing company founded in 1946, tested the science fiction market with two issues each of Futuristic Stories and Strange Adventures, in late 1946 and early 1947. Most of the stories were probably by Firth and are described by Ashley as "poorly-written" and "juvenile-oriented". Hamilton followed these with another title, Gripping Terror, a single issue of which appeared in 1949.

The only magazine started in 1946 to last more than a year was New Worlds. This had evolved from a 1930s fanzine called Novae Terrae, which was renamed New Worlds in 1939 when E. J. Carnell took over as editor. Carnell and a group of British writers planned to relaunch it as a professional magazine in 1940, but the deal fell through. The plans were revived after the war, and in July 1946 the first issue of New Worlds appeared, from Pendulum Publications. After three issues in 1946 and 1947 Pendulum went bankrupt. Carnell, Gillings, Wyndham, and three other science fiction fans formed Nova Publications to take over the magazine, and after a delay of over a year two more issues appeared in 1949, after which Nova planned to move the magazine to a quarterly schedule.

=== Reprinted US magazines ===
As well as his own magazines, Swan reprinted a handful of US pulps: three issues of Weird Tales in 1942, and two of Science Fiction Quarterly in 1943, though these were retitled. After the war a few more issues of reprinted US science fiction and fantasy pulps appeared, including short-lived versions of Amazing Stories, Fantastic Adventures, and Weird Tales. In 1949 Pembertons began a reprint series of Startling Stories that was more successful, lasting until 1954 and producing 18 issues. The same year, Thorpe & Porter began a British edition of Weird Tales that ran for 28 issues, ending in 1954, and Atlas began a run of 10 British issues of Thrilling Wonder Stories.

== 1950 to 1965 ==
=== Nova magazines ===
In 1950, with New Worlds on a stable footing, Nova decided to add a companion title. Since the demise of Fantasy in 1947, Gillings had continued to publish his fanzine, Science Fantasy Review. Nova hired Gillings to edit their new magazine, Science Fantasy, incorporating his fanzine into the new magazine as a non-fiction department. Two issues appeared in 1950, after which Nova decided to cut costs by giving Carnell the editorship of both magazines, letting Gillings go. New Worlds' schedule settled down to quarterly by the end of 1950, and then to bimonthly in 1952; it was now publishing stories by the best of the British science fiction writers, including Clarke, Wyndham, James White, and John Christopher. Science Fantasy took longer to achieve a regular schedule, publishing only four more issues by the end of 1953. New Worlds was also delayed in 1953 by problems with their printer, but from 1954 onwards, after Nova had been acquired by Maclaren & Sons Ltd, a technical trade publisher, both magazines were on stable schedules.

By the mid-1950s New Worlds and Science Fantasy were the leading UK science fiction magazines, and in 1957 New Worlds won a special Hugo Award at the World Science Fiction Convention in London. A planned associated series of science fiction novels was abandoned after the Maclaren takeover, but serialized novels in the magazine included Philip K. Dick's Time Out of Joint, Cyril M. Kornbluth's Take-Off, and Theodore Sturgeon's Venus Plus X. J. G. Ballard was a frequent contributor with short stories that included "Billennium" in 1961, and Carnell was the first person to publish Harry Harrison's controversial "The Streets of Ashkelon", about a missionary attempting to convert a village of aliens to Christianity. The Sector General series by James White, focusing on medical plots involving aliens, began in New Worlds in 1957, and Michael Moorcock's "Elric of Melniboné" stories began to appear in Science Fantasy in the early 1960s. Ashley describes the period from 1956 to 1961 as New Worlds' "golden era", and considers Science Fantasy's peak to have been from 1961 to 1964, when it was nominated for the Hugo Award three times.

In 1958 a third magazine was added: Science Fiction Adventures, planned as a reprint edition of the American magazine of that name published by Irwin Stein. The first UK issue was dated March 1958, but that summer the US magazine ceased publication. Nova decided to keep the UK version going despite this, and after its fifth issue it printed almost entirely new material rather than reprints. Carnell planned for Science Fiction Adventures to focus on unpretentious adventure fiction, and sales were initially strong. Ballard appeared in Science Fiction Adventures in 1962, with The Drowned World, and John Brunner's "Society of Time" stories appeared there, along with stories by William F. Temple, Kenneth Bulmer, and E.C. Tubb.

By 1963 all three of Nova's magazines were struggling, with a circulation of around 5,000. The last issue of Science Fiction Adventures was dated May 1963, and both New Worlds and Science Fantasy were scheduled to cease publication, their last issues expected in April 1964. A chance meeting led to Roberts & Vinter, a paperback publisher, acquiring both titles, which continued in paperback format with Michael Moorcock as editor of New Worlds, and Kyril Bonfiglioli in charge of Science Fantasy. New Worlds continued for many years, but Science Fantasy only survived until 1967.

=== John Spencer ===
The early 1950s also saw the launch of four magazines from John Spencer, a publisher founded in the late 1940s by Samuel Assael and Maurice Nahum. None of the magazines carried a cover date, but the first issue of Futuristic Science Stories appeared in April 1950, Worlds of Fantasy in June, Tales of Tomorrow in September, and Wonders of the Spaceways in February 1951. A total of 50 issues of these titles appeared by the end of 1954, when they added a fifth magazine, Out of This World, which produced two issues. One more issue of Futuristic Science Stories appeared in 1958. Spencer's pay rates were low, so many experienced writers never submitted stories to them, and the majority of the stories were probably written by John F. Watt, a writer of westerns and romance novels. The result, in Ashley's words, was that "these magazines contained the worst science fiction ever published". Few writers who appeared in the pages of the Spencer magazines had success elsewhere: among the exceptions were Lan Wright, E. C. Tubb, and Sydney J. Bounds. In 1954 Spencer began Supernatural Stories, a "surprisingly readable" magazine according to Ashley. Eight issues appeared by late 1955, followed by a hiatus until early 1957, when it appeared again in paperback form, alternating between novels and collections of short stories. In this later format it could be considered a book series rather than a magazine. The early issues were mostly written by John Glasby under a variety of pseudonyms; the paperback issues were mostly written by Robert Lionel Fanthorpe, who was responsible for 83 issues.

=== Authentic Science Fiction ===
Despite the example of John Spencer, the market for poor-quality fiction was becoming saturated. By late 1949 Hamilton & Co. were starting to see reduced print runs for their paperbacks, and when Gordon Landsborough took over editorial policy for them, he was concerned that they would need better-quality fiction to compete when paper rationing ended. He persuaded them to increase pay rates so he could attract better writers. He focused on improving their science fiction list, since he considered that sf readers would be more likely to be attracted by intellectual plots and better writing. He started a twice-monthly series of science fiction novels in January 1951, and when Hamilton asked him to launch an sf magazine, he gradually converted the novels into a magazine format, changing to a monthly frequency in May and changing the title to Authentic Science Fiction in September. H. J. Campbell took over from Landsborough as editor at the end of the year. The magazine sold well, reaching a circulation of 20,000 while Landsborough was still in charge, and perhaps as high as 30,000 later, but it did not pay well enough to attract the best writers. Campbell turned over the editorial chair to E.C. Tubb at the start of 1956, and Tubb, who had already been selling frequently to the magazine, increased his production further, sometimes writing stories to fill out the magazine when he did not have enough satisfactory manuscripts on hand. Authentic published "little fiction of any lasting quality", according to Ashley, though it did print Charles L. Harness's The Rose. Late in 1957, Hamilton decided to shut down the magazine in favour of investment in their paperback publishing business; the last issue was dated October.

=== Nebula Science Fiction ===
In September 1952, Peter Hamilton, whose parents ran a printing business in Glasgow, launched Nebula Science Fiction, the first Scottish sf magazine. The schedule was erratic for much of the magazine's life, initially because Hamilton had to wait for spare capacity in his parents' printing plant to become available before he could print each issue. Hamilton, who was 18 years old, had help from experienced science fiction fans in producing and editing the magazine, and after a while he was able to pay better rates than any of the other British sf magazines. The magazine was popular with both writers and fans. Hamilton was the first editor to buy stories from Robert Silverberg, Brian Aldiss, and Bob Shaw, (Note: In Aldiss's case the story's publication was delayed, and so was not his first sale to see print. Silverberg had previously sold a piece to a little magazine in the US, but had not sold anything to a science fiction magazine.) and he also published work by Harlan Ellison, James White, and Barrington Bayley. Three-quarters of Nebula's circulation was in overseas markets, so when first South Africa and then Australia began to limit foreign magazine imports, and then the UK imposed excise duties, the magazine began to lose money. Hamilton had to cease publication in mid-1959.

=== Vargo Statten Science Fiction Magazine ===
Scion, Ltd., had been incorporated in 1948 and began as a comics publisher, but soon switched to novels. In 1950 Fearn sent Maurice Read, Scion's editor, manuscripts of two science fiction novels. Read, like Landsborough at Hamilton & Co., saw an opportunity, and started a line of science fiction paperbacks. Fearn's novels sold well, and Scion launched a magazine to take advantage of his popularity. The title, Vargo Statten Science Fiction Magazine, was taken from one of Fearn's pseudonyms. Scion decided to target a juvenile audience, with the result that some material was returned to authors with a request to simplify it for young readers. Aldiss was one author whose work was rejected in this way; he refused and never submitted anything else to the magazine. Other than Fearn, the only well-known writers to appear in the magazine were E. C. Tubb and Kenneth Bulmer.

Scion were fined in 1954 for publishing pornography; the charge was related to their gangster novels. The resulting financial pressure, combined with a drop in Scion's paperback sales, led to Dragon Press, the magazine's printer, taking over ownership of the magazine. The editor, Alistair Paterson, left, and Fearn himself took over as editor with the December 1954 issue. The magazine survived for another year, ceasing publication with the nineteenth issue in early 1956.

=== Other British magazines ===
Gerald Swan continued to issue occasional magazines of science fiction or fantasy interest in the 1950s. In 1954 he published eight issues of Space—Fact and Fiction, which contained a mix of new and reprinted stories, and in 1960 he published three issues of Science Fiction Library and three of Weird and Occult Library. The latter contained stories by Fearn and other regular contributors to Swan's magazines; Ashley suggests these were old stories Swan had in his inventory which he was using up as he prepared to retire. Science Fiction Library included some new and some reprinted material, including stories by Cyril M. Kornbluth and Donald Wollheim, reprinted from the early 1940s. One of the new stories was by Maurice Hugi, who had died in 1947, implying again that Swan was clearing out old inventory.

In early 1957 the first issue of Phantom appeared, edited by Leslie Syddall. The publishers (first Dalrow and then Pennine) were both based in Bolton, and may never have existed except as a name on the magazine's masthead. Phantom focused on weird fiction and initially printed plotless tales of hauntings, but after four issues it began to include reprints and new stories by American writers, including work by Andre Norton. No well-known British writers contributed, though Fanthorpe and Glasby both sold to the magazine. It produced 16 monthly issues, ending in July 1958. Syddal may also have been involved with Screen Chills and Macabre Stories, a single issue of which appeared in November 1957. This was an attempt to reach the same readers that the US magazine Famous Monsters of Filmland would target a few months later. The issue contained fictionalized retellings of recent horror films, and a reprinted story by Robert Bloch, taken from Weird Tales.

In 1960 Cliff Lawton, who had been art director on Phantom, began a new magazine titled A Book of Weird Tales. Forrest Ackerman's literary agency provided material for the magazine, and Ackerman was credited as associate editor. Most of the contents were reprints, but Marion Zimmer Bradley contributed a new short story, titled "The Wild One".

=== Reprints of US magazines ===
Both Thorpe & Porter and Pembertons, each of which had begun reprinting US pulps in the late 1940s, continued to try reprints of various US titles. Pembertons reprinted Planet Stories and Super Science Stories in the early 1950s, each of which lasted for several years, and Thorpe & Porter published runs of Fantastic Adventures and Amazing Stories. Their most successful title was Galaxy, which they began in 1953 and which survived for 94 issues until 1962. Atlas added a five-year run of The Magazine of Fantasy & Science Fiction, from 1959 to 1964, as well as 28 issues of Venture Science Fiction which was a longer run than that of the original US magazine. The only other publisher to reprint more than a few US science fiction magazines was Strato, which printed issues of If, Beyond Fantasy Fiction, Future, and Science Fiction between 1953 and 1960.

== List of magazines ==
=== Original British magazines ===
These magazines originated in the UK, rather than being reprints of US science fiction and fantasy magazines.

Title	First issue	Last issue	Publisher	# issues	New or reprint?	Notes	Sources
Scoops	1934	1934	C. A. Pearson	20	New		
Mystery and Detection	1934	1935	World's Work	10	Reprint	The count includes Tales of Mystery and Detection from the "Master Thriller" series.	
Tales of the Uncanny	1934	1939	World's Work	3	New & reprint	The count includes issues published under this title in the "Master Thriller" series.	
Fireside Ghost Stories	1937	1937	World's Work	1	New & reprint		
Tales of Wonder	1937	1942	World's Work	16	New		
Ghosts and Goblins	1938	1938	World's Work	1	New		
Fantasy	1938	1939	George Newnes	3	New		
Weird Story Magazine	1940	1946	Gerald Swan	3	New		
Yankee Science Fiction	1942	1942	Gerald Swan	3	New		
Yankee Weird Shorts	1942	1942	Gerald Swan	3	New		
Occult	c. 1945	1945	Gerald Swan	2	New		
Weird Shorts	1945	1945	Gerald Swan	1	Reprint		
Futuristic Stories	1946	1946	Hamilton	2	New		
Outlands	1946	1946	Outlands	1	New		
Strange Love Stories	1946	1946	Utopian	1	New & reprint		
Strange Tales	1946	1946	Utopian	2	Reprint		
Thrilling Stories	1946	1946	Utopian	1	New		
Fantasy	1946	1947	Temple Bar	3	New		
Strange Adventures	c. 1946	c. 1947	Hamilton	2	New		
New Worlds	1946	2024	Pendulum, Nova, Roberts & Vinter.	157	New	Over 200 total issues eventually appeared.	
Gripping Terror	c. 1949	c. 1949	Hamilton	1	New		
Tales of Tomorrow	1950	1954	John Spencer	11	New		
Worlds of Fantasy	1950	1954	John Spencer	14	New		
Futuristic Science Stories	1950	1958	John Spencer	16	New		
Science Fantasy	1950	1967	Nova, Roberts & Vinter	79	New	Two more issues appeared after 1965, followed by another 12 under the titles Impulse and SF Impulse.	
Wonders of the Spaceways	1951	1954	John Spencer	10	New		
Authentic Science Fiction	1951	1957	Hamilton	85	New		
Nebula Science Fiction	1952	1959	Crownpoint, Peter Hamilton	41	New		
Space—Fact and Fiction	1954	1954	Gerald Swan	8	New & reprint		
Out of This World	1954	1955	John Spencer	2	New		
Vargo Statten Science Fiction Magazine	1954	1956	Scion, Dragon	19	New		
Supernatural Stories	1954	1967	John Spencer	101	New	Seven more issues appeared after 1965. The last issue was numbered 109, but issue 108 was probably never published.	
Screen Chills and Macabre Stories	1957	1957	Pep	1	New		
Phantom	1957	1958	Dalrow, Pennine	16	New		
Science Fiction Adventures	1958	1963	Nova	32	New & reprint		
A Book of Weird Tales	1960	1960	Veevers & Hensman	1	New		
Science Fiction Library	1960	1960	Gerald Swan	3	New		
Weird and Occult Library	1960	1960	Gerald Swan	3	Reprint		

=== Reprints of US and Australian magazines ===
These magazines are reprinted versions, often abridged, of US science fiction and fantasy magazines. In almost all cases these carry the same title as the US or Australian original.

Title	First issue	Last issue	Publisher	# issues	Notes	Sources
Thrills	1939	1939	Atlas	1	Contains stories from the Clayton pulps, including one long fantasy story.	
Astounding Science Fiction	1939	1953	Atlas	222	Corresponds to US issues of similar date.	
Science Fiction	1939	1939	Atlas	2	Partial reprints of the October and December 1939 issues.	
Unknown	1939	1949	Atlas	41		
Weird Tales	1942	1942	Gerald Swan	3	Abridged from 1940 and 1941 issues.	
Science Fiction Quarterly	1943	1943	Gerald Swan	2	Two almost complete issues from 1940 and 1942, retitled by Swan as The Moon Conquerors and Into the Fourth Dimension.	
Amazing Stories	1946	1946	Ziff-Davis	1	Undated; reprints stories from several different US issues.	
Fantastic Adventures	1946	1946	Ziff-Davis	2	Assembled from various 1940s issues.	
Weird Tales	1946	1946	William Merrett	1	Abridged from US October 1936 issue.	
Horror Stories	c. 1948	c. 1952	Thorpe & Porter	4	Stories taken from issues in 1940 and 1941.	
Dime Mystery Magazine	c. 1949	1951	Thorpe & Porter	6	Reprints issues from 1948 to 1950, plus one new story. Titled Mystery Stories for the last three issues.	
Startling Stories	1949	1954	Pembertons	18	Corresponds to US issues between 1946 and 1954.	
Super Science Stories	1949	1950	Thorpe & Porter	3	Corresponds to US issues dated January and November 1949 and January 1950.	
Weird Tales	1949	1954	Thorpe & Porter	28	Corresponds to US issues between 1949 and 1954.	
Wonder Stories	1949	1953	Atlas	10	Taken from US issues of similar dates.	
Amazing Stories	1950	1953	Thorpe & Porter	24	Each issue corresponds to a single US issue though these were not sequential.	
Fantastic Adventures	1950	1954	Thorpe & Porter	24	Corresponds to issues from the early 1950s.	
Fantastic Novels	c. 1950	c. 1950	Thorpe & Porter	1	Reprints the November 1949 US issue.	
Fantastic Novels	c. 1950	c. 1950	Pembertons	1	Reprints part of the May 1949 US issue.	
Jungle Stories	1950	1950	Pembertons	5	Corresponds to US issues from 1949 and 1950.	
Planet Stories	1950	1954	Pembertons	12	Corresponds to US issues from 1949 to 1954; two issues include nonfiction from other magazines.	
Super Science Stories	1950	1950	Popular	1	Reprinted under the title Cosmic Science Stories as part of a series of pulp reprints.	
Super Science Stories	1950	1953	Pembertons	14	Corresponds to US issues between 1941 and 1951.	
Amazing Science Stories	1951	1951	Pembertons	2	Contents taken from the Australian magazine Thrills, Inc. and the US magazine Super Science Stories.	
Future	1951	1954	Hermitage	14	Contents similar or identical to US issues of similar dates.	
Marvel Science Stories	1951	1951	Thorpe & Porter	1	Reprint of the February 1951 issue.	
Science Fiction Quarterly	1952	1955	Thorpe & Porter	10	Corresponds to US issues from 1951 to 1954.	
Space Science Fiction	1952	1953	Archer	8	All issues reprinted, but not in sequence.	
Amazing Stories	1953	1955	Thorpe & Porter	8	Drawn from issues dated 1953 to 1954.	
Fantastic	1953	1955	Strato	8	Corresponds to issues from 1953 to 1954.	
Fantasy & Science Fiction	1953	1954	Mellifont	12	Selected from various 1953 and 1954 issues.	
Galaxy	1953	1962	Thorpe & Porter, Strato	94	Correspondence with US issues varies over the run.	
If	1953	1954	Strato	15	Corresponds to US issues of similar date.	
Wonder Stories	1953	1954	Pembertons	4	Taken from US issues of similar dates.	
Beyond Fantasy Fiction	1954	1954	Strato	4	Corresponds to the first four issues.	
Planet Stories	1954	1954	Streamline	1	Partial reprint of the US November 1952 issue.	
Spaceway	1954	1956	Regular	4	Includes some stories from other sources.	
Tops in Science Fiction	1954	1956	Top Fiction	3	Reprints from both the US issues. Note the US original was itself a vehicle for reprints from Planet Stories.	
Future	1957	1960	Strato	11	Contents similar or identical to US issues of similar dates.	
Science Fiction	1957	1960	Strato	12	Partial reprints of issues between 1957 and 1960.	
Fantasy & Science Fiction	1959	1964	Atlas	55	Contents drawn from US issues of a few months earlier.	
If	1959	1960	Strato	18	Corresponds to US issues of similar date.	
Venture Science Fiction	1963	1965	Atlas	28	Included some reprints from the US Fantasy & Science Fiction.	

== Sources ==
- Ashley, Mike (2000). The Time Machines: The Story of the Science-Fiction Pulp Magazines from the beginning to 1950. Liverpool: Liverpool University Press. ISBN 0-85323-865-0.
- Ashley, Mike (2004). "The Gernsback Days". In Ashley, Mike; Lowndes, Robert A.W. (eds.). The Gernsback Days: A Study of the Evolution of Modern Science Fiction From 1911 to 1936. Holicong, Pennsylvania: Wildside Press. pp. 16–254. ISBN 0-8095-1055-3.
- Ashley, Mike (1997). "Science Fantasy". In Clute, John; Grant, John (eds.). The Encyclopedia of Fantasy. New York: St Martin's Press. p. 844. ISBN 0-312-15897-1.
- Ashley, Mike (2005). Transformations: The Story of the Science-Fiction Magazines from 1950 to 1970. Liverpool: Liverpool University Press. ISBN 0-85323-779-4.
- Ashley, Mike (2006). The Age of the Storytellers: British Popular Fiction Magazines 1880-1950. London, and Newcastle, Delaware: The British Library and Oak Knoll Press. ISBN 0-7123-0698-6.
- Harbottle, Phil; Holland, Stephen (1992). Vultures of the Void: A History of British Science Fiction Publishing, 1946–1956. San Bernardino, California: Borgo Press. ISBN 978-0-89370-415-5.
- Holland, Steve (1993). The Mushroom Jungle: A History of Postwar Paperback Publishing. Westbury, UK: Zeon Books. ISBN 1-874113-01-7.
- Murray, Will (2011). "The Thrill Book Story". Pulp Vault (14). Barrington Hills, Illinois: Tattered Pages Press.
- Tymn, Marshall B.; Ashley, Mike, eds. (1985). Science Fiction, Fantasy, and Weird Fiction Magazines. Westport, Connecticut: Greenwood Press. ISBN 978-0-313-21221-5.
- Warrick, Patricia; Greenberg, Martin Harry, eds. (1975). "The Streets of Ashkelon". The New Awareness: Religion Through Science Fiction. New York: Delacorte Press. pp. 174–198. ISBN 0-440-05989-5.

=== Chapter listings for Tymn & Ashley ===
Chapters within Tymn & Ashley (1985) are identified by author and page below.

- Ashley, Mike. "Amazing Science Stories", p. 14.
- Ashley, Mike. "Amazing Stories", pp. 14–49.
- Ashley, Mike & Berger, Albert I. "Analog Science Fiction/Science Fact", pp. 60–103.
- Lawler, Donald. "Beyond Fantasy Fiction", pp. 137–142.
- Ashley, Mike. "A Book of Weird Tales", pp. 151–152.
- Ashley, Mike. "Cosmic Science Stories", p. 168.
- Ashley, Mike. "Fantastic Adventures", pp. 232–240.
- Ashley, Mike. "Fantasy (1938–1939)", pp. 254–256.
- Ashley, Mike. "Fantasy (1946–1947)", pp. 256–257.
- Ashley, Mike & Parnell, Frank H. "Fireside Ghost Stories", p. 271.
- Ashley, Mike. "Futuristic Stories", pp. 287–288.
- Lawler, Donald. "Galaxy Science Fiction", pp. 290–309.
- Ashley, Mike. "Ghosts and Goblins", pp. 317–318.
- Ashley, Mike & Parnell, Frank H. "Gripping Terror", p. 323-324.
- Casebeer, E. F. "If", pp. 329–343.
- Ashley, Mike. "Impulse", pp. 350–352.
- Weinberg, Robert. "Jungle Stories", pp. 365–366.
- Clareson, Thomas D. "The Magazine of Fantasy and Science Fiction", pp. 377–391.
- Ashley, Mike & Lofts, W. O. G. "The Master Thriller Series", pp. 404–406.
- Ashley, Mike. "Nebula Science Fiction", pp. 419–423.
- Ashley, Mike. "New Worlds", pp. 423–437.
- Ashley, Mike. "Occult", pp. 439–440.
- Ashley, Mike. "Outlands", pp. 471–472.
- Ashley, Mike. "Phantom", pp. 474–476.
- Clareson, Thomas D. "Planet Stories", pp. 476–481.
- Ashley, Mike. "Science Fantasy", pp. 505–510.
- Ashley, Mike & Thompson, Raymond H. "Science Fiction", pp. 511–519.
- Ashley, Mike. "Science Fiction Adventures (1958–1963)", pp. 526–529.
- Ashley, Mike. "Science Fiction Library", pp. 536–537.
- Ashley, Mike. "Science Fiction Quarterly", pp. 545–550.
- Ashley, Mike. "Screen Chills and Macabre Stories", p. 567.
- Ewald, Robert. "Startling Stories", pp. 611–617.
- Ashley, Mike. "Strange Adventures", pp. 620–621.
- Ashley, Mike. "Strange Love Stories", pp.622–623.
- Ashley, Mike. "Strange Tales", pp. 625–626.
- Thompson, Raymond H. "Super Science Stories", pp. 631–635.
- Ashley, Mike & Parnell, Frank H. "Tales of the Uncanny", p. 650-651.
- Ashley, Mike. "Thrilling Stories", pp. 670–671.
- Casebeer, E. F. "Tops in Science Fiction", pp. 675–677.
- Ashley, Mike. "Unknown", pp. 694–699.
- Ashley, Mike. "Vargo Statten Science Fiction Magazine", pp. 703–705.
- Ashley, Mike. "Weird Shorts", pp. 725–726.
- Ashley, Mike. "Weird Story Magazine", pp. 726–727.
- Weinberg, Robert. "Weird Tales", pp. 727–736.
- Ashley, Mike. "Yankee Science Fiction", pp. 779–780.
- Ashley, Mike. "Yankee Weird Shorts", pp. 780–781.
