= Fantasy (1946 magazine) =

British science fiction magazine

Cover of the first issue, dated December 1946; artist unknown

Fantasy was a British science fiction magazine, edited by Walter Gillings, which published three issues from 1946 to 1947. Gillings began collecting submissions for the magazine in 1943, but the publisher, Temple Bar, delayed launching it until the success of New Worlds, another British science fiction magazine, convinced them there was a viable market. Gillings obtained stories from Eric Frank Russell, John Russell Fearn, and Arthur C. Clarke, whose "Technical Error" was the first story of Clarke's to see print in the UK. Gillings published two more stories by Clarke, both under pseudonyms, but Temple Bar ceased publication of Fantasy after the third issue because of paper rationing caused by World War II. Gillings was able to use some of the stories he had acquired for Fantasy in 1950, when he became editor of Science Fantasy.

== Publication history and contents ==
Shortly before the start of World War II, two science fiction (sf) pulp magazines were launched in Britain: Tales of Wonder, which appeared in 1937, and Fantasy, which published its first issue the following year. Fantasy was forced to close down in 1939 as the war approached: the editor, T. Stanhope Sprigg, had enlisted in the RAF, and it was clear to the publisher, George Newnes Ltd, that paper rationing would soon be implemented. Tales of Wonder, published by The World's Work, was edited by Walter Gillings, who had been active in science fiction fandom since the early 1930s. Gillings was able to keep Tales of Wonder going until 1942, despite the paper shortages; even after he was drafted he was able to edit it for a while from his army camp, but the Spring 1942 issue was the last one.

By 1943 Gillings was planning a new magazine, to be published by Temple Bar. He started collecting material for it, requesting stories that showed originality and focused on "how technological advances might affect individuals rather than whole populations", in the words of sf historian Mike Ashley. Paper rationing was still a concern, and Temple Bar were not convinced there was a sufficient market for sf, so they kept delaying the launch. Gillings's initial request for submissions was not fruitful, but by 1946 he had acquired enough material for nine issues. This included several stories by Arthur C. Clarke, though he returned some of them to Clarke as the publication delays lengthened, suggesting Clarke try them in the American market. Two of the stories, "Loophole", and "Rescue Party", appeared in Astounding Science Fiction in the April and May 1946 issues; these were Clarke's first professional fiction sales.

Temple Bar began publication in 1946, convinced by the success of New Worlds, another British sf magazine, which had been launched that summer. The first issue, in digest format, was dated December 1946. The title was Fantasy, though there was no connection to Newnes' pre-war pulp magazine of that name; it was subtitled "The Magazine of Science Fiction". The lead story was "Last Conflict", by John Russell Fearn, and the issue also included a reprint of "The Worlds of If", a story by Stanley Weinbaum, and Clarke's "Technical Error"—his first sale to a British market. "Technical Error" proved to be the most popular story in the issue. Two more of Clarke's stories appeared in the next two issues, both under pseudonyms: "Castaway", as by "Charles Willis", and "The Fires Within", as by "E.G. O'Brien". Eric Frank Russell appeared in the second issue, with the lead story, "Relic", about a robot returning to Earth; Ashley describes it as memorable and comments that several other contributors to the magazine, including Leslie V. Heald, P.E. Cleator, E.R. James, and Norman C. Pallant, wrote "competent stories for the time". Sf historian Donald Tuck also lists Stanton Coblentz's "Time Trap", from the final issue, as notable. Ashley suggests that the improvement in the quality of the stories, compared to British science fiction from before the war, was partly because Astounding Science Fiction, which was the leading sf magazine of the day, was available in the UK in a British reprint edition. The British writers were starting to model their stories after what they read in Astounding—"no bad thing", in Ashley's view.

Gillings included reprints as well as new stories, and a letter column, plus some non-fiction articles which he wrote himself under pseudonyms. All three issues had a print run of 6,000 copies, and each issue sold out, but paper rationing was still in effect, and Temple Bar decided to close down the magazine and concentrate on more profitable titles. Gillings had seen the writing on the wall even before the second issue appeared, and in March 1947 produced the first issue of Fantasy Review, a high-quality fanzine. Both Fantasy Review and the inventory that Gillings had acquired for Fantasy were eventually put to use when Science Fantasy, a companion magazine to New Worlds, was launched in 1950. Fantasy Review was incorporated as a news section in Science Fantasy, and Gillings included one of Clarke's stories, "Time's Arrow", in the first issue, along with "Black Saturday" by John Russell Fearn, which Gillings had bought in 1947, and "Monster" by Christopher Youd (the real name of John Christopher). "Monster" had been Youd's first sale when Gillings bought it from him in 1946, but, as with Clarke, his first sale was not his first story to see print: instead, Youd's "Christmas Tree" appeared in Astounding Science Fiction in February 1949.

== Bibliographic details ==
The editor for all three issues was Walter Gillings. Each issue was digest-sized, saddle-stapled, with 96 pages, priced at 1/-. The magazine was published by Temple Bar. There was one volume of three issues; they were dated December 1946, April 1947, and August 1947.
