= Tillotson =

Tillotson is both a surname and a given name. Notable people with the name include:

- John Tillotson (1630–1694), Archbishop of Canterbury
- Thomas Tillotson (1750–1832), American politician
- Robert L. Tillotson (1786–1878), American lawyer and politician
- Lee Stephen Tillotson (1874–1957), American military officer
- Stephen Tillotson (1884–?), English footballer
- Roy Tillotson (1891–1962), American coach
- Neil Tillotson (1898–2001), American inventor
- Joseph Wirt Tillotson (1905–1959), American artist, also known by his pulp artist name Robert Fuqua
- Pete Tillotson (1936–2018), American basketball player
- Johnny Tillotson (1938–2025), American singer and songwriter
- Thad Tillotson (1940–2012), American baseball player
- Maurice Tillotson (1944), New Zealand footballer
- Giles Tillotson (1960), British historian
- Mary Tillotson (fl. 1970), American broadcast journalist and media lecturer
- Constance Tillotson (20th century), American actor and film director

== Given name ==
- Tillotson Terrell (1785–1838), American pioneer, one of the first twenty settlers of Ridgeville Township

== Other uses ==
- Huston–Tillotson University, located in Austin, Texas, United States
- Tillotson Manufacturing Company, maker of carburetors and other similar parts
- Tillotson Avenue, a Street located in the Eastchester section of the Bronx.
