= Fanthorpe =

Fanthorpe is a surname. Notable people with the surname include:

- Lionel Fanthorpe (born 1935), British priest and entertainer
- U. A. Fanthorpe (1929–2009), English poet
