= Fantasy (1938 magazine) =

UK pulp science fiction magazine

- Cover of the second issue, by Serge Drigin
- Editor: T. Stanhope Sprigg
- Frequency: Irregular (three issues published)
- Publisher: George Newnes Ltd.
- Country: United Kingdom
- Language: English

Fantasy was a British pulp science fiction magazine which published three issues in London between 1938 and 1939. The editor was T. Stanhope Sprigg; when the war started, he enlisted in the RAF and the magazine was closed down. The publisher, George Newnes Ltd, paid respectable rates, and as a result Sprigg was able to obtain some good quality material, including stories by John Wyndham, Eric Frank Russell, and John Russell Fearn.

== Publication history ==
The first U.S. science fiction (sf) magazine, Amazing Stories, was imported into the U.K. from its launch in 1926, and other magazines from the U.S. market were also available in the U.K. from an early date. However, no British sf magazine was launched until 1934, when Pearson's launched Scoops, a weekly in tabloid format aimed at the juvenile market. Soon Haydn Dimmock, Scoops' editor, began to receive more sophisticated stories, targeted at an adult audience; he tried to change the magazine's focus to include more mature fiction but within twenty issues falling sales led Pearson's to kill the magazine. The failure of Scoops gave British publishers the impression that Britain could not support a science fiction publication.

Despite this failure, only a year later, Newnes., the publisher of The Strand magazine, decided to launch a group of four genre pulp magazines, and to include a science fiction title in the group. The plan was the idea of T. Stanhope Sprigg, a young editor who had joined Newnes in 1934. Sprigg had help from Walter Gillings, a British science fiction reader who had been active in fan circles since the early 1930s, in searching for good submissions, and was able to obtain stories from Eric Frank Russell and John Russell Fearn, but although the other three titles—Air Stories, War Stories, and Western Stories—were launched in 1935 and 1936, the science fiction title was much delayed. Sprigg recalled later that Newnes issued a memo specifying the requirements for the stories; it was "so restricting that it threw would-be contributors into a complete tizzy". The project was placed on hold after fifteen months.

Gillings subsequently persuaded The World's Work, a subsidiary of William Heinemann, to launch a science fiction pulp magazine titled Tales of Wonder in 1937. This was successful enough to convince Newnes to go ahead with the original plan, and Fantasy was launched in July 1938, with an issue dated only with the year. Another issue appeared six months later and a third and final issue in June 1939, again dated only with the year; Sprigg enlisted as a pilot when World War II started, and although a fourth issue had been prepared, it was clear that paper rationing was coming, and Newnes decided to close down the magazine.

== Contents and reception ==
The lead story for the first issue was "Menace of the Metal Men", by A. Prestigiacomo; this was a 1933 reprint from the British edition of Argosy, but the other stories in the issue were all new. Contributors included John Wyndham, Eric Frank Russell, and John Russell Fearn, and a couple of writers who were not known in the science fiction world but who had contributed to Newnes' other magazines: J.E. Gurdon and Francis H. Sibson. There was an article on interplanetary travel by P.E. Cleator, which continued a series of articles he had published in Scoops. Newnes paid competitive rates for fiction, so they were able to attract good quality submissions, many of which were subsequently reprinted in the U.S. These included Wyndham's "Beyond the Screen" (described by sf historian and critic Sam Moskowitz as "an engrossing story"); Halliday Sutherland's "Valley of Doom"; and Eric Frank Russell's "Vampire from the Void", which was reprinted in Fantastic in 1972, having been submitted there by Russell's agent as if it were a new story. When the editor, Ted White, was told that the story was over thirty years old, he initially denied that it was possible, but ultimately accepted that it was a reprint: science fiction historian Mike Ashley comments that this indicated Russell's fiction "stood well the test of time".

The main artist for Fantasy was Serge Drigin, a Russian-born artist who worked for Pearson's and had been responsible for all the covers for Scoops; Drigin did interior artwork and all three covers. Though his work has been described as "crude" and "mediocre", science fiction art historian Robert Weinberg regards the cover for the second issue, illustrating "Winged Terror" by G.R. Malloch, as "highly effective and easily the best thing he ever did".

== Bibliographic details ==
Fantasy was printed in pulp format, 128 pages, and priced at 1/-. All three issues were edited by T. Stanhope Sprigg and published by Newnes. There was no volume numeration; each issue was dated only with the year.

== Sources ==
- Mike Ashley (2000). The Time Machines:The Story of the Science-Fiction Pulp Magazines from the beginning to 1950. Liverpool: Liverpool University Press. ISBN 0-85323-865-0.
- Ashley, Mike (1985a). "Fantasy (1938–1939)". In Tymn, Marshall B.; Ashley, Mike (eds.). Science Fiction, Fantasy, and Weird Fiction Magazines. Westport CT: Greenwood Press. pp. 254–256. ISBN 0-313-21221-X.
- Harbottle, Phil; Holland, Stephen (1992). Vultures of the Void: A History of British Science Fiction Publishing, 1946–1956. San Bernardino CA: Borgo Press. ISBN 0-89370-415-6.
- Weinberg, Robert (1988). "Drigin, Serge R.". In Weinberg, Robert (ed.). A Biographical Dictionary of Science Fiction and Fantasy Artists. Westport CT: Greenwood Press. pp. 97–98. ISBN 0-313-24349-2.
