= Fortean TV =

- Genre: Documentary; Paranormal
- Directed by: Luke Campbell
- Starring: Lionel Fanthorpe
- Country of origin: United Kingdom
- Original language: English
- No. of episodes: 22 (+ Xmas Special)

Production
- Running time: 22 minutes

Original release
- Network: Channel 4
- Release: 29 January 1997 – 19 December 1998

Fortean TV was a British paranormal documentary television series produced by Rapido TV, originally broadcast from 29 January 1997 to 6 March 1998 on Channel 4. The series was about anomalous phenomena and the paranormal, based upon the Fortean Times magazine; it was presented by Reverend Lionel Fanthorpe. Fortean TV ran for 3 series (the third was an adult version renamed Fortean TV Uncut with unseen material from the previous two series as well as new items). The three seasons comprised 22 half-hour episodes (the last of the first season was a compilation "Best Of"), plus a final hour-long family Christmas special.

Series 1 contained 9 unique episodes, broadcast on Wednesday evenings (29 January – 26 March 1997), with a final tenth "Best Of" the following week to round off the season (Wednesday, 2 April 1997).

Series 2 contained 8 unique episodes, beginning again the following January, broadcast now on Friday evenings (16 January – 6 March 1998).

Fortean TV Uncut – a short four-episode adult spin-off series with unseen material from the previous two series as well as new items – immediately followed (beginning less than a week after the second series had finished), now back on Wednesday evenings (11 March – 1 April 1998).

The show concluded with a Christmas Special at the end of that year entitled Xmas Files (Saturday 19 December 1998).

The show's theme tune was Danny's Inferno by The Three Suns.

The entire show was released on DVD in the UK in 2021, and was repeated on TV from April 18th 2026 on Talking Pictures TV.
