= Empire Cinema, Blackpool =

Demolished hall in Lancashire, England

Coordinates: 53°47′45.8″N 3°01′45.9″W

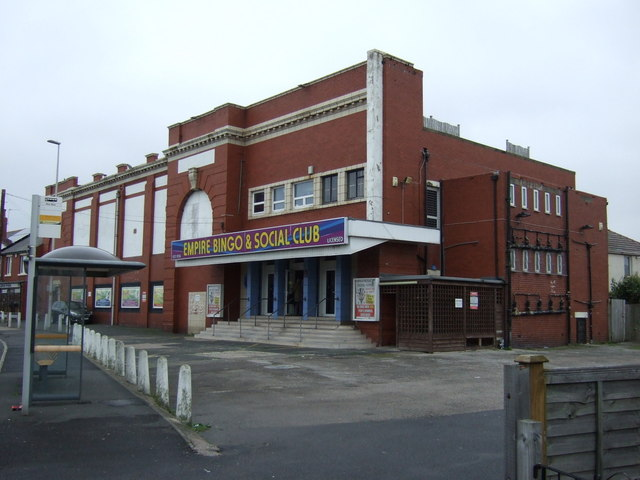
Pictured in 2014

The Empire Cinema was a 1920s structure in Blackpool, Lancashire, in England, United Kingdom. It was built as a cinema and was used as such until 1959 when it became a nightclub, known as Casino. The Casino club hosted concerts by acts including the Beatles and Shirley Bassey. In 1974 it became a bingo hall and operated as such until 2020. The structure was locally listed but was demolished in 2021.

== Cinema ==
The structure was constructed between 1928 and 1929 for Nottingham Cinemas Limited. It was designed by Lancashire architect Halstead Best. The structure, in Hawes Side Lane, had a proscenium width of 24 feet (7.3 m) and between 868 and 929 seats. The cinema served as a meeting hall for Labour Party events in the 1930s.

The theatre was modernised in 1939 which saw its capacity increase to between 1,094 and 1,194 seats. During the early 1940s the science fiction writer John Russell Fearn served as the cinema's chief projectionist. During the Second World War Fearn was the only full-time science fiction writer in Britain. When writers lost their status as a reserved occupation in 1941 Fearn was obliged to undertake essential war work. He served in an aircraft factory but found the work hard ("it damned near killed me") and managed to get approval to accept the offer of a job at the cinema from his friend who was manager there. Fearn enjoyed the work and it gave him enough spare time to write 5,000 words a day. The cinema closed in 1959.

== Later uses ==
The structure was later converted into a nightclub, branded as Casino. The club hosted concerts by many popular musicians such as the Beatles, Shirley Bassey, Tom Jones and Gerry and the Pacemakers. In 1974 the club was purchased by Elaine and John Bottomley and converted into a bingo hall. The couple owned five other bingo halls in the town but after John's death in 1994 Elaine sold the other sites.

== Demolition ==
The bingo hall closed in 2020 with Elaine Bottomley blaming the effects of the COVID pandemic and social distancing measures. She had sought planning permission to convert the structure into 14 flats in 2018 but this had proved unviable due to the age of the building. In April 2021 the structure was demolished to be redeveloped for housing. The structure had been locally listed at the time of its demolition. Since the demolition Blackpool Council passed a direction to require planning permission for the demolition of any locally listed building.
