= John Spencer science fiction magazines =

British science fiction magazines

In the 1950s, British firm John Spencer & Co. published four science fiction magazines in digest format: Futuristic Science Stories, Worlds of Fantasy, Tales of Tomorrow, and Wonders of the Spaceways. All were launched between April 1950 and February 1951. Maurice Nahum and Samuel Assael, who ran John Spencer, co-edited three of the titles; Assael was the sole editor for Tales of Tomorrow except for the second issue, which Nahum again co-edited. The magazines were of very poor quality; Mike Ashley, a historian of science fiction, describes them as "containing the worst science fiction ever published".

Payment rates were low, at ten shillings (£0.50) per 1,000 words; few writers were willing to accept rates that low, and as result the magazines contained a good deal of material from authors used to producing fiction at very high speed, often under multiple pseudonyms. The first few issues were mostly the work of just three authors: Norman Lazenby, John F. Watt, and Sydney J. Bounds.

== Sources ==
- Ashley, Mike (2005). Transformations: The Story of the Science Fiction Magazines from 1950 to 1970. Liverpool: Liverpool University Press. ISBN 0-85323-779-4.
