= The Nicholas Hamond Academy =

Location
- Brandon Road; Swaffham, Norfolk, PE37 7DZ; England; 52°38′21″N 0°41′21″E

Information
- Type: Academy
- Established: 1736; 290 years ago
- Trust: Academy Transformation Trust
- Department for Education URN: 138918 Tables
- Ofsted: Reports
- Principal: Mark Woodhouse
- Gender: Coeducational
- Age: 11 to 16
- Website: tnha.attrust.org.uk

The Nicholas Hamond Academy is a coeducational secondary school academy status, located in Swaffham, Norfolk, England. The present-day school was the product of a merger of the local grammar and secondary modern schools in 1977.

== History ==
=== Beginnings ===
The foundation of Hamond's Grammar School is documented in an inscribed stone plaque on its original location, a building behind St Peter & St Paul CE Church. Nicholas Hamond Esq, Lord of the Manor of Swaffham "Gave by Will in 1724 a thousand pounds". "Five hundred pounds for erecting a school House" and "five hundred pounds for endowing the same for instructing 20 boys in reading, writing and arithmetic"'. The inscription continues by hopefully suggesting that: "BENEFACTORS who promote Knowledge Virtues & Industry Deserve to be Recorded on Earth and Rewarded in Heaven".

Hamond's legacy continued with the setting up of a charity, now known as The Hamond Educational Charity, to manage its endowment. As the school would later become a government-funded school, the charity now endows various bursaries and scholarships for qualified local students. The school building was constructed on a site behind the church frequently utilised for recreational purposes, hence the name "Campinglands". It had accommodation for the schoolmaster and 40 boys, who were nominated by the vicar. By 1834 there were only 20 free boys, and by 1870 all the students paid fees. A National school was built opposite. The Elementary Education Act 1870 (33 & 34 Vict. c. 75) made education compulsory for children aged 5–10. The changing demographics of the local population led to the closure of the secondary school from 1892 to 1895, leaving the town without any secondary schools during that period of time. In 1896, Hamond's School became an Education Board School solely for secondary aged children.

In 1904 it moved to new premises at 20 Market Place, now a Grade II listed building. The vacated building behind the church continued to be used by the parish as a function hall.

Swaffham Secondary Modern School was opened in 1955 with a brand-new purpose-built campus on Brandon Road. The expansion of RAF Marham saw a growing number of school-aged children, necessitating the need to expand secondary education provisions as Marham did not have a secondary school.

=== Merger and later history ===
The two schools were merged in 1977 after the tripartite system was abolished. The newly merged school, named Nicholas Hamond High School was to be located on site of the former secondary modern. The historic Market Place site was vacated and housed the sixth form centre until 2009.

It converted to an academy in 2012 and was renamed accordingly.

The headteacher was dismissed by the trust on 18 October 2016, and replaced by the extant deputy head. This caused disruption in the school which was identified by an Ofsted Inspection in 2017. The schools grade fell from 'Good' to 'Requires Improvement'.

== Curriculum ==
=== Key Stage 3 ===
All students in England are obliged to follow the National Curriculum and assessed against the Progress 8 benchmark.

=== Key Stage 4 ===
In Key Stage 4 students study a core curriculum and one subject from a restricted list of computer science, Geography, History, French, Spanish. They then choose three subjects from the full list of Computer Science, Geography, History, French, Spanish, PE, Business Studies, Travel and Tourism, Health & Social Care, Drama, Music, Art or DT.

=== Key Stage 5 Offer ===
The academy offers four subjects at Key Stage 5 these are:

- A-Level Sociology
- BTEC National Extended Certificate in Business Studies
- OCR Cambridge Technical in Heath & Social Care
- BTECNational Extended Certificate in Child's Play and Development Studies.

Both the Business Studies and the Health and Social Care can be extended to the Diploma (equivalent to 2 A-Levels).

== Notable former pupils ==
- Lionel Fanthorpe, priest, entertainer, television presenter, author and lecturer.
- Andrew Lambert, Laughton Professor of Naval History in the War Studies Department at King's College London.

=== Hamond's Grammar School ===
- Michael Bourke, Bishop of Wolverhampton from 1994 to 2007
- Alwyn Davies, Professor of Chemistry from 1969 to 1991 at University College London
- Frank Dye, long distance dinghy sailor
- John Ellis, RAF chaplain-in-chief
