= The Master Thriller Series =

British pulp magazine series

- Frequency: Quarterly (1933–1938); Monthly (1939)
- Publisher: The World's Work
- First issue: July 1933
- Final issue: December 1939
- Country: United Kingdom
- Language: English

The Master Thriller Series was a series of British pulp magazines that reprinted American pulp fiction in various genres. It was published by The World's Work, starting in July 1933, and lasted till the end of 1939. Authors who appeared in its pages included Somerset Maugham and Algernon Blackwood.

== Publishing history and contents ==
The first issue, titled Tales of the Foreign Legion, appeared in July 1933, and was followed at approximately quarterly intervals by issues each of which were focused on a particular type of story, such as horror, mystery, or sea stories. The publisher, The World's Work, was a subsidiary of the American publisher Doubleday, and initially many of the reprints were from magazines published in the US by Doubleday or Dell. In early 1939, after 24 issues, it switched to monthly publication, and this lasted until the end of the year. The final issue, titled Tales of Ghosts and Haunted Houses, appeared in December 1939.

The quality was high to start with, but declined, with well-known names such as Somerset Maugham, Algernon Blackwood, and P.C. Wren appearing early in the series, and less prestigious authors in the later titles. British reprints also began to appear, and there were a few original stories as well as the reprints. Some of the titles, such as Tales of the Uncanny and Tales of the Jungle, were popular enough for a second issue under the same title to re-appear. The most popular was Tales of the Foreign Legion, which saw five issues.

The World's Work produced several other magazines that were associated with The Master Thriller Series, but not part of it, including Fireside Ghost Stories, Ghosts and Goblins, and Mystery and Detection, a series that followed #4 in The Master Thriller series, Tales of Mystery and Detection. Tales of Wonder, was once thought by bibliographers to be part of The Master Thriller Series but it is now known to have been a separate series from the outset.

Mike Ashley, a magazine historian, describes the quality of the stories as "variable, but the variety of themes makes the overall package of greater value than individual issues".

== Bibliographic details ==
There were 32 issues of The Master Thriller Series. The publisher was The World's Work, and the editor was H. Norman Evans. All issues were in pulp format and priced at 1/-; all were 128 pages except for the final issue, which was 96 pages.

Publication schedule
	Jan	Feb	Mar	Apr	May	Jun	Jul	Aug	Sep	Oct	Nov	Dec
1933							#1		#2			#3
1934			#4			#5			#6			#7
1935			#8				#9			#10		
1936	#11			#12			#13			#14		
1937	#15			#16			#17			#18		
1938	#19			#20			#21			#22		
1939	#23			#24	#25	#26	#27	#28	#29	#30	#31	#32

The titles of the individual issues were as follows.

1. Tales of the Foreign Legion
2. Tales of the North-West Mounted Police
3. Tales of the Seven Seas
4. Tales of Mystery and Detection
5. Tales of the Foreign Legion #2
6. Tales of the Uncanny
7. Tales of African Adventure
8. Tales of the Orient
9. Tales of the Jungle
10. Tales of the Foreign Legion #3
11. Tales of the Sea
12. Tales of Valour
13. Tales of the Levant
14. Tales of the Air
15. Tales of the Foreign Legion #4
16. Tales of Adventure
17. Tales of Terror
18. Tales of East and West
19. Tales of the Underworld
20. Tales of the Uncanny #2
21. Tales of Crime and Punishment
22. Tales of the Grand Express
23. Tales of the North-West Mounted Police #2
24. Tales of Outlawry
25. Tales of the Grand Dominion
26. Tales of the Far Frontier
27. Tales of the Underworld #2
28. The Far-Flung Coasts of Crime
29. Tales of the Foreign Legion #5
30. Tales of the Jungle #2
31. Tales of Gangsters and 'G'-Men
32. Tales of Ghosts and Haunted Houses

== Sources ==
- Ashley, Mike (2006). The Age of the Storytellers. London: British Library & Oak Knoll Press. ISBN 0-7123-0698-6.
