= Tales of Wonder (magazine) =

20th-century British science fiction magazine

- The first issue of Tales of Wonder
- Editor: Walter Gillings
- Publisher: The World's Work
- First issue: June 1937
- Final issue: 1942
- Country: UK
- Language: English

Tales of Wonder was a British science fiction magazine published from 1937 to 1942, with Walter Gillings as editor. It was published by The World's Work, a subsidiary of William Heinemann, as part of a series of genre titles that included Tales of Mystery and Detection and Tales of the Uncanny. Gillings was able to attract some good material, despite the low payment rates he was able to offer; he also included many reprints from U.S. science fiction magazines. The magazine was apparently more successful than the other genre titles issued by The World's Work, since Tales of Wonder was the only one to publish more than a single issue.

Arthur C. Clarke made his first professional sale to Tales of Wonder, with two science articles. Gillings also published William F. Temple's first story, some early material by John Wyndham, and "The Prr-r-eet" by Eric Frank Russell. American writers who appeared in the magazine included Murray Leinster and Jack Williamson; these were both reprints, but some new material from the U.S. did appear, including Lloyd A. Eshbach's "Out of the Past", and S.P. Meek's "The Mentality Machine". With the advent of World War II, paper shortages and Gillings' call up into the army made it increasingly difficult to continue, and the sixteenth issue, dated Spring 1942, was the last. Tales of Wonder was not the first British science fiction magazine, but it was the first one aimed at an adult market, and its success made it apparent that a science fiction magazine could survive in the UK.

== Publication history ==
The first US science fiction (sf) magazine, Amazing Stories, was imported into the UK from its launch in 1926, and other magazines from the U.S. market were also available from an early date. No British sf magazine appeared until 1934, when Pearson's launched Scoops, a weekly in tabloid format aimed at the juvenile market. Soon Haydn Dimmock, Scoops' editor, began to receive more sophisticated stories, targeted at an adult audience; he tried to change the magazine's focus to include more mature fiction, but within twenty issues falling sales led Pearson's to cancel the magazine. The failure of Scoops gave British publishers the impression that Britain could not support a science fiction publication.

Despite this failure, only a year later, George Newnes, Ltd., the publisher of The Strand magazine, decided to launch a group of four genre pulp magazines, and to include a science fiction title. The editor, T. Stanhope Sprigg, had help from Walter Gillings, a British science fiction reader who had been active in fan circles since the early 1930s, in searching for good submissions, but the project was placed on hold after fifteen months. Gillings next approached The World's Work, a subsidiary of William Heinemann, who were already publishing titles such as Tales of Mystery and Detection and Tales of the Uncanny, as part of their Master Thriller series. Gillings had heard that The World's Work were planning a science fiction magazine; as it turned out this was not the case, but Gillings was quickly able to persuade them to add science fiction to their list. He was asked to prepare a single issue of 80,000 words to test the market. The World's Work reprinted a good deal of American fiction and since they were only paying for reprint rights their rates were lower than was usual for new fiction. Gillings was given a budget of 10/6 (ten shillings and sixpence) per thousand words: the low rate discouraged those writers who could sell to the better-paying American magazines. Newer writers were glad of the chance to develop a British market for their work, though most American writers were unimpressed.

The first issue of Tales of Wonder appeared in June 1937. Sales were good enough for The World's Work to continue publication, and from Spring 1938 the magazine appeared on a quarterly schedule, with occasional omissions. None of the other titles in the Master Thriller series ever turned into a separate magazine, so it was evidently selling well. The success of Tales of Wonder led Newnes to believe that they had been wrong to turn down Gillings, and in 1938 they launched Fantasy as a competitor.

The outbreak of the Second World War in 1939 did not immediately lead to paper shortages, but paper began to be rationed in April 1940, and the page count, which had already dropped from 128 to 96, fell to 72 by 1941. Gillings was called up for military service, and for a while he was able to edit the magazine from his army camp, but the magazine eventually ceased publication with the Spring 1942 issue.

== Contents and reception ==
American science fiction magazines had by the mid-1930s begun to publish some more sophisticated stories than the straightforward adventure fiction that was a staple of the earliest years of the genre. Gillings decided that many British science fiction readers would not be familiar with most of the developments in American sf, and so he did not make a point of seeking innovative and original material. The first issue contained "The Perfect Creature", an early story by John Wyndham, under the name "John Beynon", as well as "The Prr-r-eet", by Eric Frank Russell. The second issue included Wyndham's novel Sleepers of Mars, and William F. Temple's "Lunar Lilliput", which was Temple's first science fiction sale. "Stenographer's Hands", a story by David H. Keller, also appeared in the second issue, reprinted from a US magazine; Gillings claimed that this was to introduce British science fiction readers to American developments in sf, but in fact it was because he was having trouble obtaining good quality material from British writers.

Other reprints acquired by Gillings included Murray Leinster's "The Mad Planet" and its sequel, "The Red Dust", and two stories by Jack Williamson: his first sale, "The Metal Man", along with "The Moon Era"; these were both by American writers though Gillings tried to reprint stories from the US markets by British writers when he could. Reprints were not restricted to American and British authors, or the US pulp market: Gillings also ran "The Planet Wrecker" by R. Coutts Armour, an Australian writer who used the pseudonym "Coutts Brisbane"; the story had originally appeared in The Red Magazine in 1914. Some new stories from American writers appeared, including Lloyd A. Eshbach's "Out of the Past", and S.P. Meek's "The Mentality Machine". Gillings ran competitions for reader essays, one of which was won by Ken Bulmer, later a well-known British science fiction writer, and he encouraged fans to contribute, with articles and fillers. The most significant writer introduced by Gillings was undoubtedly Arthur C. Clarke, whose first sales were to Gillings, for the science articles "Man's Empire of Tomorrow" and "We Can Rocket to the Moon—Now!", which were published in the Winter 1938 and Summer 1939 issues.

Science fiction historian Mike Ashley regards Tales of Wonder as "a lively, entertaining and enjoyable magazine". Its success demonstrated that there was a market in Britain for a magazine aimed at adult science fiction readers, despite the earlier failure of Scoops, and in 1938 George Newnes, Ltd. went ahead with their much-delayed plans for an sf magazine, Fantasy, having seen the success of Tales of Wonder.

== Bibliographic details ==
	Winter	Spring	Summer	Autumn	Winter
1937					1
1938		2	3	4	5
1939		6	7	8	9
1940		10	11	12	
1941	13	14		15	
1942		16			
Issues of Tales of Wonder, showing issue number. Walter Gillings was editor throughout.

Tales of Wonder was published in pulp format for all 16 issues. It began at 128 pages; this was cut to 96 pages with the Winter 1939 issue; then to 80 pages with the Autumn 1940 issue; and finally to 72 pages for the last three issues. It was edited throughout by Walter Gillings, and was priced at 1/-. There was no volume numbering; each issue was numbered consecutively.

== Sources ==
- Ashley, Mike (1985a). "Fantasy (1938–1939)". In Tymn, Marshall B.; Ashley, Mike (eds.). Science Fiction, Fantasy, and Weird Fiction Magazines. Westport, Connecticut: Greenwood Press. pp. 254–256. ISBN 978-0-313-21221-5.
- Ashley, Mike (1985b). "Tales of Wonder". In Tymn, Marshall B.; Ashley, Mike (eds.). Science Fiction, Fantasy, and Weird Fiction Magazines. Westport, Connecticut: Greenwood Press. pp. 652–654. ISBN 978-0-313-21221-5.
- Ashley, Mike (2000). The Time Machines:The Story of the Science-Fiction Pulp Magazines from the beginning to 1950. Liverpool: Liverpool University Press. ISBN 978-0-85323-865-2.
- Harbottle, Phil; Holland, Stephen (1992). Vultures of the Void: A History of British Science Fiction Publishing, 1946–1956. San Bernardino, California: Borgo Press. ISBN 978-0-89370-415-5.
- Tuck, Donald H. (1982). Encyclopedia of Science Fiction and Fantasy, Vol. 3. Chicago: Advent: Publishers. ISBN 978-0-911682-26-7.
