= T. Stanhope Sprigg =

British magazine editor

Theodore Stanhope Sprigg
- Born: December 5, 1903; Brighton, Sussex, England, U.K.
- Died: June 8, 1977 (aged 73); Dartmouth, Devon, England, U.K.
- Occupation: Publisher
- Years active: 1924
- Known for: Founding of the magazine publishing house Airways Publications
- Spouse: Vida M.H. Devant (m. 1929)
- Parents: Stanhope W. Sprigg (father); Jessie Mary Caudwell (mother)
- Family: Christopher St John Sprigg (brother)
- Military career
- Allegiance: United Kingdom
- Branch: Royal Air Force
- Rank: Wing Commander
- Unit: Royal Air Force Volunteer Reserve
- Wars: World War II

Wing Commander Theodore Stanhope Sprigg (12 May 1903 - 8 June 1977) was a British magazine editor. His father, Stanhope W. Sprigg, had been the first editor of The Windsor Magazine. Sprigg and his brother started a publishing company, Airways Publications, in 1924, and published Airways, a magazine about air travel. Over the next few years they added other titles, including Aircraft Engineering, Flying, and Who's Who in British Aviation. He earned a pilot's license in 1931.

In 1934 he proposed to publisher Newnes four fiction titles: Air Stories, Fantasy, War Stories, and Western Adventures. The first to appear was Air Stories, in May 1935; War Stories was begun in October 1935, but only lasted five issues. It was replaced by Western Adventures in February 1936, which also failed after only five issues. Fantasy was delayed for several years, perhaps because Scoops, the first attempt at a British science fiction magazine, had proved to be a failure in 1934. It was finally launched in 1938, and produced three issues over the next year. Air Stories was the most successful of the four, lasting five years on a regular monthly schedule. However, Sprigg was in the Royal Air Force Volunteer Reserve, and when World War II began he was called up and both Air Stories and Fantasy ceased publication.

Sprigg left the RAFVR in 1954 with rank of wing commander.

== Works ==
- Marvels Of The Air 1936 Newnes
- Civil Aviation As A Career1939, Newnes
- Bombers of the RAF
- The Royal Air Force 1941, Collins
- Battleships with Wings 1942 Collins - covering RAF Coastal Command
- Wings of the Army 1945 . Collins
- War Story Of The Fighter Command
- The Aeroplane Directory of British Aviation (1966) Temple Press. with W.L. Marsh, C.P. Bracken, W.C.M. Whittle

== Sources ==
- Ashley, Mike (2006). The Age of the Storytellers. London: British Library & Oak Knoll Press. ISBN 0-7123-0698-6.
