= Vargo Statten Science Fiction Magazine =

British science fiction magazine

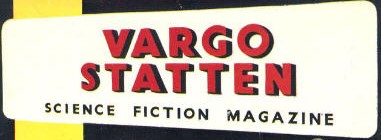
The Vargo Statten Science Fiction Magazine logo as it appeared on the first issue

Vargo Statten Science Fiction Magazine (later Vargo Statten British Science Fiction Magazine, The British Science Fiction Magazine and The British Space Fiction Magazine) was a British science fiction magazine which published nineteen issues between 1954 and 1956. It was initially published by Scion Press, with control passing to a successor company, Scion Distributors, after Scion went bankrupt in early 1954. At the end of 1954, as part payment for a debt, Scion Distributors handed control of the magazine to Dragon Press, who continued it for another twelve issues. E. C. Tubb and John Russell Fearn were regular contributors, and Kenneth Bulmer also published several stories in the magazine. Barrington Bayley's first published story, "Combat's End", appeared in May 1954. The editor was initially Alistair Paterson, but after seven issues Fearn took the helm: "Vargo Statten" was one of Fearn's aliases, and the magazine's title had been chosen because of his popularity. Neither Paterson nor Fearn had enough of a budget to attract good quality submissions, and a printing strike in 1956 brought an end to the magazine's life.

== Publication history and contents ==
In the early 1950s, British publisher Scion published dozens of science fiction (sf) novels by John Russell Fearn under the pseudonym "Vargo Statten". These were very successful, and Scion decided to take advantage of the popularity of the name by issuing a monthly sf magazine. The first issue was dated January 1954 and was edited by Alistair Paterson. The target audience included long-time fans: Scion had notified established science fiction fan groups before the launch, so there was a letter column in the first issue, and a column by Vincent Clarke, a well-known fan, covered fan news. Scion's stated intention was to have at least 10% of the magazine devoted to the sf fan community, and also to publish only stories by British writers. Paterson's editorial policy for the fiction was aimed at younger readers, which led him to return a story by Brian Aldiss with a request for a rewrite to make it more suitable for teenaged readers. Aldiss, then right at the start of his career, refused, and never submitted a story to the magazine again. The stories in the early issues were mostly written by Fearn, E.C. Tubb, and F. Dubrez Fawcett, who also wrote gangster fiction for Scion.

In early 1954, Scion were fined heavily for publishing a pornographic gangster novel. Key Scion staff decided to restart the company under the name Scion Distributors, with Paterson continuing as editor. The magazine format was changed from pulp to digest with the May 1954 issue—the first from the new company. Scion Distributors had also acquired Scion's debts when they restarted the company, and this included a large debt to the printers, Dragon Press. Scion gave Dragon Press control of the magazine with the December 1954 issue as payment for the debt, along with the novels they had rights to and their contract with Fearn. Paterson resigned and Fearn took his place, insisting when he did so that his pseudonym be removed from the magazine's title. It was renamed The British Science Fiction Magazine from the September 1954 issue. In the opinion of sf historians Philip Harbottle and Stephen Holland, the quality of the magazine began to improve significantly, with stories by E.C. Tubb, Kenneth Bulmer, Fearn himself, and Barrington Bayley, whose first story, "Combat's End", had appeared in the May 1954 issue. However, sf historian Mike Ashley suggests that despite Fearn's efforts, only the E.C. Tubb stories, published under the pseudonym "George Holt", were a noticeable improvement in quality. When the circulation began to fall, Dragon Press quickly cut Fearn's budget in half, from 25 shillings to only 12/6 per thousand words. This was half the word rate on offer at other British science fiction magazines of the era, and left Fearn unable to compete for the best stories. Fearn printed material of his own that he had been unable to sell elsewhere, and was also able to save some money by reprinting stories of his that had originally appeared in the U.S. magazines. More money was saved by changing the format to paperback size, and simplifying and standardizing the cover design. The magazine struggled on until early 1956, when a printers' strike caused Dragon Press to fold. The last issue appeared in January 1956.

== Bibliographic details ==
	Jan	Feb	Mar	Apr	May	Jun	Jul	Aug	Sep	Oct	Nov	Dec
1954	1/1	1/2		1/3	1/4		1/5		1/6		1/7	1/8
1955	1/9	1/10	1/11	1/12		2/1	2/2	2/3	2/4	2/5	2/6	
1956	2/7											
Issues of Vargo Statten Science Fiction Magazine from 1954 to 1956, showing volume and issue number, and colour-coded to indicate the editor: Alistair Paterson (blue), and John Russell Fearn (yellow). Note that some of the earlier issues were not dated internally and approximate dates have been assigned based on the contents of the magazines.

The first seven issues were edited by Alistair Paterson, and the remainder by John Russell Fearn. The magazine was priced at 1/6 throughout its run. It was initially pulp-sized and 64 pages long, but changed to digest format at 128 pages with the May 1954 issue, and then to a paperback size, also at 128 pages, from the February 1955 issue onwards.

The title was initially Vargo Statten Science Fiction Magazine; this changed to Vargo Statten British Science Fiction Magazine with the May 1954 issue, then to The British Science Fiction Magazine with the September 1954 issue, and finally to The British Space Fiction Magazine with the June 1955 issue. The publisher was Scion, Ltd. of London for the first three issues, then Scion Distributors, Ltd. of London for the next four issues, and finally Dragon Publications Ltd. of Luton for the remaining issues.

== Sources ==
- Ashley, Mike (1985). "Vargo Statten Science Fiction Magazine". In Tymn, Marshall B.; Ashley, Mike (eds.). Science Fiction, Fantasy, and Weird Fiction Magazines. Westport, Connecticut: Greenwood Press. pp. 703–705. ISBN 0-313-21221-X.
- Ashley, Mike (2005). Transformations:The Story of the Science-Fiction Magazines from 1950 to 1970. Liverpool: Liverpool University Press. ISBN 0-85323-779-4.
- Harbottle, Philip; Holland, Stephen (1992). Vultures of the Void. San Bernardino CA: Borgo Press. ISBN 0-89370-315-X.
- Harbottle, Philip (2001). "Introduction". The Best of John Russell Fearn: Volume Two: Outcasts of Eternity and Other Stories. Gillette NJ: Wildside Press. pp. 6–11. ISBN 1-58715-326-2.
