= Gerald Swan =

British market stall holder and publisher

Gerald Swan was a market stall holder and later publisher of British comics and annuals in the 1940s and 1950s.

== Biography ==
Gerald G. Swan was born in 1902. In 1921 at the age of 19 he setup a market stall selling second hand books and comics. In the 1930s his stall was on Church Street Market in London.

He created his publishing company before the outbreak of the second world war two but instead of distributing books he stockpiled them meaning he ended up with a big supply of paper whilst the country was in the middle of rationing paper, which gave him a good advantage over his competitors.

He started publishing comics in 1940 in the midst of the second world war. After realising the best selling comics on his stall were American ones he released comics in a more American style.

Gerald Swan died in 1980.

== Gerald G. Swan Ltd ==
His comics consisted of 36 page anthologies priced at three pence. His first comic published was New Funnies in early 1940. Followed by Topical Funnies, War Comics, Thrill Comics, Fresh Fun and Extra Fun, all released in the same year. Other comics released by Gerald Swan included Comicolour, Cute Fun and Slick Fun.

As well as comics he also released undated annuals called albums these included the Comicolour Album, Cute Fun, Kiddyfun album, Picture Story Album and Slick Fun Album.

Gerald Swan comics are well known for their amateurishness being described by comics historian Alan Clark as "crude and almost amateurish in appearance and content". But they are also well known for their quirky enthusiasm and the lack of censorship compared to other contemporary publishers.

Artists who worked on Gerald Swan comics included William Ward, an animator who had worked on Bonzo the Dog cartoons. He created characters including Krakos the Egyptian, a resurrected pharaoh who patrolled foggy wartime London and in one episode destroyed the Japanese fleet attempting to invade Australia. William Ward also created Dr Satani - Crime Chemist.

Another artist on the comics was Edward Henry Banger, who had drawn the cover strip Koko the Pup for DC Thomson's short lived The Magic Comic. Banger signed his work Bang. Banger was described as an exceptional artist by Alan Clark. Banger's creations included Skit the Kat, Tornado Tom, Exploring - with Professor Peek and Phuzzy his Pygmy Guide, Slick Sure the Detective, Chubb and Tubb, Stoogie and Superstooge.

Some of the artists who worked on the comics also did work for Amalgamated Press with some of them saying they preferred working on Gerald Swan comics because of the slightly better pay and greater freedom.

His last comics were published in 1957 with the rights of his comics being sold to World International Publishing.

== Publications ==
=== Comics ===
- Comicolour
- Cute Fun
- Slick Fun
- Tropical Funnies
- Dynamic Thrills

=== Annuals/Albums ===
- Comicolour Album
- Cute Fun Album
- Funnies Album
- Slick Fun Album
- Picture Story Album
- Kiddyfun Album
- Fairies Album
- Schoolboys Album
- Schoolgirls Album
- Birthday Fun Album
- Scramble
- Girl's Fun
- Western Fun Comics Album
- Bible Story Album
- Babies Album
- Bunny Annual
