= Thrills Incorporated =

Australian science fiction magazine

Thrills Incorporated was an Australian science fiction magazine.

== Amazing Science Stories ==
Amazing Science Stories was a British science fiction magazine which published two undated issues in 1951. The publisher was Pemberton's, of Manchester; the editor was not identified, but may have been Stafford Pemberton. The contents included reprints from Thrills Incorporated, and also from Super Science Stories, which had had a British edition, published by Pemberton's.
