= Science Fantasy (magazine) =

British science fiction magazine (1950–1964)

Cover for the inaugural issue, which appeared in Summer 1950.

Science Fantasy, which also appeared under the titles Impulse and SF Impulse, was a British fantasy and science fiction magazine, launched in 1950 by Nova Publications as a companion to Nova's New Worlds. Walter Gillings was editor for the first two issues, and was then replaced by John Carnell, the editor of New Worlds, as a cost-saving measure. Carnell edited both magazines until Nova went out of business in early 1964. The titles were acquired by Roberts & Vinter, who hired Kyril Bonfiglioli to edit Science Fantasy; Bonfiglioli changed the title to Impulse in early 1966, but the new title led to confusion with the distributors and sales fell, though the magazine remained profitable. The title was changed again to SF Impulse for the last few issues. Science Fantasy ceased publication the following year, when Roberts & Vinter came under financial pressure after their printer went bankrupt.

Gillings had an inventory of material that he had acquired while editing Fantasy, and he drew on this for Science Fantasy, as well as incorporating his own fanzine, Science Fantasy Review, into the new magazine. Once Carnell took over, Science Fantasy typically ran a long lead novelette along with several shorter stories; prominent contributors in the 1950s included John Brunner, Ken Bulmer, and Brian Aldiss, whose first novel Nonstop appeared (in an early version) in the February 1956 issue. Fantasy stories began to appear more frequently during the latter half of the 1950s, and in the early 1960s Carnell began to publish Thomas Burnett Swann's well-received historical fantasies. Carnell felt that the literary quality of Science Fantasy was always higher than that of New Worlds, and in the early 1960s his efforts were rewarded with three consecutive Hugo nominations for best magazine. Under Bonfiglioli more new writers appeared, including Keith Roberts, Brian Stableford and Josephine Saxton. In the opinion of science fiction historian Mike Ashley, the final year of Impulse, as it was titled by that time, included some of the best material ever published in a British science fiction magazine.

== Publication history ==
=== Gillings and Carnell ===
		Spring			Summer			Autumn			Winter	
	Jan	Feb	Mar	Apr	May	Jun	Jul	Aug	Sep	Oct	Nov	Dec
1950						1/1						1/2
1951												1/3
1952			2/4						2/5			
1953			2/6									
1954			7 (nd)		8		9		10			11
1955		12		13		14			15		16	
1956		17			18			19				20
1957		21		22		23		24		25		26
1958		27		28		29		30		31		32
1959		33		34		35		36			37	38
Issues of Science Fantasy in the 1950s, showing volume/issue number, and color-coded to show who was editor for each issue. Walter Gillings was the editor for the first two issues; John Carnell took over for the remainder of the 1950s. Underlining indicates that the magazine was titled with the season (e.g. "Summer 1950") for that issue. Issue 7 was only dated with the year, 1954.

In early 1946, John Carnell launched a new science fiction magazine titled New Worlds, published by Pendulum Publications. The first issue appeared in July 1946 and failed to sell well. The second issue, that October, sold better, but Pendulum went out of business before the end of 1947 with only one more issue released. A group of sf fans, including Carnell and Frank Cooper, decided to restart the magazine under their own control, and formed Nova Publications Ltd. The fourth issue appeared in April 1949.

At the same time that the first issue of New Worlds appeared, a separate British magazine called Fantasy was launched by Walter Gillings, a science fiction fan and a reporter by profession. Fantasy lasted for only three issues before closing in 1947, but Gillings had accumulated a substantial inventory of stories—enough to fill nine issues. Gillings followed the demise of Fantasy by publishing a fanzine, titled Fantasy Review, beginning in March 1947.

In 1950, with New Worlds on a stable quarterly schedule, Nova Publications decided to launch a companion, Science Fantasy. They chose Gillings as the editor, and his fanzine, which had been retitled Science Fantasy Review in 1949, was incorporated in the new magazine as a department. The first issue was dated Summer 1950, but printing disputes meant that the second issue was delayed until winter. Paper rationing delayed the third issue to Winter 1951, but before it appeared, Nova decided that it could no longer afford to have separate editors for New Worlds and Science Fantasy, and Gillings was let go. According to Carnell, there were also "fundamental differences of opinion" that led to the decision to replace him. (Note: Gillings felt betrayed by the decision, and in combination with a family bereavement this led to him disappearing from the British science fiction world for twenty years.)

After the Spring 1953 issue, Nova Publications decided to switch printers, in order to cut costs and bring the cover price down from 2/- (10 p) to 1/6 (7.5 p). The new printers, The Carlton Press, failed to keep to the agreed printing schedule, and produced poor quality work; there were also printers' strikes, and this disruption caused extended delays in the appearance of the seventh issue. While the dispute with the printers was going on, Carnell and Maurice Goldsmith, a journalist acquaintance of Carnell's, put together a small conference of well-known science fiction authors, including Arthur C. Clarke and John Wyndham. Goldsmith covered the conference for Illustrated, a weekly magazine, and the article caught the attention of Maclaren & Sons Ltd, a technical trade publisher interested in launching a new sf magazine. Carnell turned down the offer because of his loyalty to Nova Publications, but subsequent discussions ultimately led to Maclaren taking control of Nova Publications, with a commitment to produce New Worlds on a monthly basis and Science Fantasy on a bimonthly schedule. Maclaren's legal department was helpful in resolving the dispute with The Carlton Press, and the seventh issue of Science Fantasy finally appeared with a cover date of March 1954.

In 1958, Nova decided to launch a British reprint of the American magazine Science Fiction Adventures, under the same title. The British Science Fiction Adventures lasted until May 1963, when it was felled by declining sales. New Worlds, Nova's flagship title, and Science Fantasy were also suffering from poor sales, with circulation estimated at about 5,000, though a change from bimonthly to a monthly schedule was also considered that year for Science Fantasy. (Note: A plan to switch to a monthly schedule was announced in the editorial of the August 1963 issue; this was surprising in view of the low circulation as normally a monthly schedule would be undertaken only by a successful magazine.) In September Nova decided to close down both remaining titles, and in preparation for the change Carnell signed a contract in December 1963 to edit an original anthology series, New Writings in SF, for publisher Dennis Dobson. Readers' responses to news of the planned demise of the magazines included a letter from Michael Moorcock, published in the April 1964 New Worlds, asking how the British market would now be able to train writers to sell to the higher-paying US magazines.

=== Roberts & Vinter ===
	Jan	Feb	Mar	Apr	May	Jun	Jul	Aug	Sep	Oct	Nov	Dec
1960		39		40		41		42		43		44
1961		45		46		47		48		49		50
1962		51		52		53		54		55		56
1963		57		58		59		60		61		62
1964		63		64		65	66		67			68
1965	69		70	71	72	73	74	75	76	77	78	79
1966	80	81	1/1	1/2	1/3	1/4	1/5	1/6	1/7	1/8	1/9	1/10
1967	1/11	1/12										
Issues of Science Fantasy in the 1960s, showing volume/issue number, and color-coded to show who was editor for each issue. John Carnell was the editor until April 1964, after which Kyril Bonfiglioli took over. The last five issues were edited by Keith Roberts and Harry Harrison. Issues 65 through 69 were titled with the name of two consecutive months—e.g. issue 66 was dated July–August 1964.

In early 1964, David Warburton of Roberts & Vinter, an established publisher, heard from the printer of Science Fantasy and New Worlds that the magazines were going to fold shortly. Warburton decided that having a respectable magazine would help him in getting good distribution for Roberts & Vinter's books: Science Fantasy and New Worlds both had distribution arrangements with the two main British newsagents of the time, John Menzies and W.H. Smith. (Note: Warburton's partner, Godfrey Gold, published pin-up magazines, and was also interested in the magazines for the same reason.) Carnell did not want to continue to edit the magazines in addition to New Writings in SF, and recommended Moorcock to Warburton; Kyril Bonfiglioli, an Oxford art dealer who was a friend of Brian Aldiss, also expressed an interest. Warburton gave Moorcock the choice of which magazine to edit; Moorcock chose New Worlds, and Bonfiglioli became the new editor of Science Fantasy. Roberts & Vinter changed the format from digest to paperback, and the first issue under Bonfiglioli's control was number 65, dated June–July 1964. The schedule was initially somewhat irregular, with each issue dated with two months even when two issues were only a month apart—for example, June–July 1964 was followed by July–August 1964. From March 1965 a regular monthly schedule was begun.

Bonfiglioli often bought material from writers without an established reputation; he did not make any special effort to acquire stories from well-known names. He was known for writing long and helpful rejection letters to newcomers, but he also had a reputation for laziness, and much of the day-to-day editorial work was done by assistants—first James Parkhill-Rathbone, and then Keith Roberts.

Bonfiglioli disliked the title of the magazine, feeling that it "promised the worst of both worlds"; he proposed Caliban as the new title, but the publisher dissuaded him. He settled on Impulse instead, and the magazine appeared under the new title starting with the March 1966 issue. The paperback format was unchanged, but the volume numeration was restarted at volume 1 number 1, to "sever all connections with Science Fantasy", in the words of sf historian Mike Ashley. The name change proved to be disastrous; there was already a magazine called Impulse, and this caused distribution problems. In addition, treating Impulse as a new magazine meant a fresh distribution contract was needed. Bonfiglioli attempted to repair the damage by changing the name to SF Impulse starting in August 1966, but the result was a dramatic drop in circulation.

By late 1966 Bonfiglioli had made enough money from his antiques dealing to be able to retire to Jersey. J. G. Ballard was briefly involved with the magazine in an editorial role, but his aims for the magazine were too far from the publisher's goals and he was quickly replaced by Harry Harrison. Harrison almost immediately had to leave England and handed over much of the day-to-day management of the magazine to Keith Roberts. Despite the setback from Bonfiglioli's title change, the magazine was still profitable, but in July 1966 Roberts & Vinter's distributor, Thorpe & Porter, went bankrupt while owing Roberts & Vinter a substantial sum. The resulting financial pressure led Roberts & Vinter to decide to focus on their more profitable magazines, and the February 1967 issue of SF Impulse was the last, though New Worlds, the sister magazine, survived via an Arts Council grant obtained by Brian Aldiss's efforts. The title was merged with New Worlds with effect from the March 1967 issue, but nothing of SF Impulse's content was retained.

== Contents and reception ==
=== 1950s ===
R.M. Bull's cover for the third issue is "strikingly reminiscent of the work of Margaret Brundage for Weird Tales in the thirties", according to sf historian David Kyle.

In the first issue, Gillings declared that he was interested in science fantasy "in all its forms: with its significant ideas, its surprising prophecies, its sheer fictions, its evolution as a fascinating literature". Stories in the first issue, drawn from Gillings' inventory of material acquired for Fantasy, included "The Belt", by J.M. Walsh; "Time's Arrow", by Arthur C. Clarke; and "Monster", by John Christopher, writing as Christopher Youd. Gillings also included several non-fiction features, such as his fanzine, Science Fantasy Review, incorporated into Science Fantasy as a department, and condensed to a few pages. In the first issue Gillings reviewed an article about science fiction by Jacob Bronowski which had appeared in the Continental Daily Mail. There were also three book review columns: two by Gillings, writing under pseudonyms, and one by John Aiken, the son of poet Conrad Aiken.

When Carnell took over, he planned to distinguish Science Fantasy from its sister magazine, New Worlds, by adding more fantasy, while printing nothing but sf in New Worlds, though it took some time for the two magazines to develop separate personalities. Carnell dropped the non-fiction features and instead published a series of guest editorials, starting with Gillings in the third issue and H.J. Campbell in the fourth issue. The acquisition of Nova Publications by Maclaren gave Carnell access to the publishing facilities of a well-established company, and to established distribution channels, which freed him to focus on his editorial duties. Carnell tended to put longer stories in Science Fantasy than in New Worlds, and Science Fantasy typically ran a long lead novelette with several short stories. Stories that would not have suited New Worlds began to appear, such as William F. Temple's "Eternity" (February 1955), in which aliens mysteriously provide haloes to thousands of people, and Dal Stiven's "Free Will", which featured robot ghosts. Stories in the whimsical fantasy tradition that had been started by Unknown did not often appear in Science Fantasy.

Many of the lead novelettes in the 1950s were provided by John Brunner and Ken Bulmer. Brunner's first appearance was in September 1955 with "The Talisman"; over the next few years he wrote both science fiction and fantasy for Science Fantasy, including "A Time to Read" (December 1956), an alternate-world fantasy, and "Lungfish" (December 1957), a generation starship story. Bulmer's first appearance in Science Fantasy was in June 1955, with "Psi No More"; he contributed regularly thereafter. A short version of Brian Aldiss's first novel, Nonstop, appeared in the February 1956 issue, and Aldiss subsequently contributed some experimental stories. From 1956 onwards the magazine contained substantially more fantasy than sf.

In Carnell's opinion, the literary quality of Science Fantasy was "far higher" than that of New Worlds, but New Worlds was always the better-selling of the two magazines. Carnell's determination to keep the quality high led him to delay publishing issue 20 for two months because of a "lack of suitable material". His efforts were rewarded by frequent appearances of stories from Science Fantasy in the annual Year's Greatest SF anthology series edited by Judith Merril. Carnell occasionally used reprints, often selecting stories in line with the magazine's focus on offbeat fantasy, such as Fritz Leiber's "Space-Time for Springers", and Theodore Sturgeon's "The Graveyard Reader". Towards the end of the 1950s Carnell began to reintroduce non-fiction, and starting in 1959 he printed a series of articles by Sam Moskowitz on key figures in the early history of science fiction, such as Edgar Allan Poe; these articles, which had first appeared in American magazines such as Satellite Science Fiction, were later collected as Explorers of the Infinite. The artwork was of variable quality, in the opinion of critic Brian Stableford; among the better covers Stableford cites the work of Brian Lewis, who supplied almost all Science Fantasy's cover art from 1958 through 1961. Historian David Kyle commented on the "remarkable" cover by R.M. Bull for the third issue, which he regarded as "strikingly reminiscent of the work of Margaret Brundage for Weird Tales in the thirties."

=== 1960s ===
In the early 1960s, Thomas Burnett Swann became strongly associated with Science Fantasy. He had published a couple of genre short stories before beginning to sell to Carnell with "The Dryad-Tree" in the August 1960 issue. Swann's speciality was historical fantasy, and Where Is the Bird of Fire?, his retelling of the Romulus and Remus myth, which was serialised in Science Fantasy in 1962, "received more praise than any other [novelette] in recent years", according to Carnell. Swann was one of the three mainstays of Science Fantasy in the early 1960s: the others were Michael Moorcock and J.G. Ballard. Ballard's first story in Science Fantasy was "Prima Belladona", which appeared in the December 1956 issue; his work over the next few years was ideally suited to Science Fantasy and he became a regular contributor. He published some conventional stories in the British magazines, but over the next few years Ballard's more traditional science fiction material appeared mostly in the American market, with Science Fantasy and New Worlds reserved for more experimental material that was a harbinger of New Wave science fiction. Moorcock's Elric of Melniboné series, about a sword and sorcery anti-hero, began with "The Dreaming City" in the June 1961 Science Fantasy, and Moorcock appeared frequently thereafter: he had either a story or an essay (and sometimes both) in all but four of the remaining issues edited by Carnell. Terry Pratchett's first story, "The Hades Business", appeared in the August 1963 issue. Ashley regards the early 1960s as one of the high points of the magazine; it was nominated for the Hugo Award for each of the last three years in which Carnell edited it, from 1962 to 1964, but it never won.

When Kyril Bonfiglioli took over in 1964, he complained in his first editorial that he had "just read through a quarter of a million words of ms [manuscript] and half of it was so bad it made me blush". He asked Brian Aldiss to help; the only unsold stories Aldiss had were from his early days, "written before I got the hang of things", but Bonfiglioli told Aldiss, "They can't possibly be worse than the rubbish that's being submitted". (Note: Quoted by Mike Ashley from private correspondence with Aldiss.) Aldiss provided four stories for the first two issues, under his own name and two pseudonyms, "Jael Cracken" and "John Runciman". Bonfiglioli's third issue included Keith Roberts' first two stories: "Escapism", a time travel tale, and "Anita", the first in a series about a witch; Roberts became a frequent contributor both under his own name and as "Alistair Bevan", and also provided the artwork for several covers. (Note: In fact Carnell had been the first editor to buy from Roberts, but the stories he acquired for New Writings in SF did not appear until after Roberts appeared in Science Fantasy.) The Day of the Minotaur, another historical fantasy by Thomas Burnett Swann, began serialisation in the same issue under the title The Blue Monkeys. Swann's novel The Weirwoods was also serialised in the magazine, with no change of title. Other new writers who began to appear under Bonfiglioli's editorship included Josephine Saxton and Brian Stableford. Bonfiglioli's focus on stories that he liked personally, rather than on a specific editorial policy, led author Christopher Priest to describe Science Fantasy under Bonfiglioli's editorship as "a literate and charmingly eccentric magazine, with an atmosphere all its own".

At the World Science Fiction Convention in 1965, held in London, Bonfiglioli persuaded several well-known writers to appear in an "all-star issue ... with specially written stories round the theme of 'sacrifice'". The issue in question was the first one under the new title of Impulse, in March 1966; it included fiction by James Blish, Brian Aldiss, Harry Harrison, J.G. Ballard, Poul Anderson, Jack Vance, and Keith Roberts, who contributed "The Signaller", the first story in his Pavane sequence. The second issue was also high quality, with another Pavane story and a short story by John Brunner from his "Traveller in Black" series. Subsequent issues did not sustain this high level, but overall, in Ashley's opinion, the twelve issues of Impulse contained "some of the best SF and fantasy ever published in British magazines". Christopher Priest's first story, "The Run", appeared in the May 1966 issue, and Chris Boyce's second story, "George", was published in June 1966. Two novels were serialised in Impulse, both well-received: Harry Harrison's Make Room! Make Room! (later made into the movie Soylent Green), and Moorcock's The Ice Schooner. Other stories listed by Ashley include Thomas Disch's "The Roaches" and "The Number You Have Just Reached", and Aldiss's "The Eyes of the Blind King". Stableford also praises the covers for the last few issues, which were mostly done by Keith Roberts in a semi-abstract style unlike conventional genre art.

== Bibliographic details ==
The editorial succession at Science Fantasy was as follows:

- Walter Gillings: Summer 1950 – Winter 1950.
- John Carnell: Winter 1951–1952 – April 1964.
- Kyril Bonfiglioli: June–July 1964 – September 1966.
- Harry Harrison and Keith Roberts: October 1966 – February 1967.

The publisher was Nova Publications until April 1964, and Roberts & Vinter Ltd thereafter.

Science Fantasy was digest-sized for its first two issues. The size increased to a large digest for the next four issues, but with issue seven it returned to a small digest again, and remained in that format until the June–July 1964 issue, which was issued in paperback format. The remaining issues, including all those under the Impulse title, were published as paperbacks. It initially was priced at 2/-; the price was cut to 1/6 for the third issue, but returned to 2/- with the seventh issue. With issue 11 (December 1954) the price returned to 2/-, and it rose to 2/6 with issue 46 and to 3/- with issue 61. When the format changed to paperback with issue 65 the price dropped again to 2/6, and remained there until the title change to Impulse. All the twelve Impulse issues were priced at 3/6. The page count began at 96, and rose to 128 with issue 7. Issues 36 through 63 were 112 pages, and the final digest-sized issue was 124 pages. The paperback issues were 128 pages under the Science Fantasy title, and 160 pages for the Impulse issues. Volume numbering began with two volumes of three issues, but the second volume began with volume 2, number 4 instead of restarting the issue number at 1 as would usually be done. From issue 7 the volume number was dropped completely.

The schedule was initially quite irregular, with the first two issues, in Summer and Winter 1950, followed almost a year later by a Winter 1951–52 issue. Spring and Autumn 1952 were followed by Spring 1953 and then another long delay to the seventh issue which was dated 1954, without a month or season given. The schedule became more regular thereafter, with May 1954 inaugurating a bimonthly schedule that lasted till November 1955, except that September 1954 was followed by a December issue, and June 1955 was followed by September. After February, May and August 1955, the December 1956 issue began a regular bimonthly sequence that was marred only by the appearance of a November 1959 issue between the August and December issues. After the switch to paperback, the sequence ran as follows: June–July 1964, July–August 1964, September–October 1964, December 1964 – January 1965, January–February 1965, and then monthly from March 1965 to the end.

There have been no anthologies drawn solely from the pages of Science Fantasy, but Weird Shadows From Beyond, edited by John Carnell, and published by Corgi Books in 1965, drew eight of its ten stories from the magazine.

In 2013, a 371-page volume written by John Boston and curated by Damien Broderick, titled Strange Highways: Reading Science Fantasy, 1950–1967 was published by Borgo/Wildside in the US. It discusses, sometimes in detail, every issue, story, writer, cover, and even advertisement of the magazine.
