= John Glasby =

John Stephen Glasby (23 September 1928 – 5 June 2011) was a British author born in East Retford in Nottinghamshire whose work spanned a range of popular genres. A professional research chemist and mathematician, he produced more than 300 novels and short stories during the 1950s and 1960s, most of which were published under pen names by the Badger Books imprint.

== Works ==
Glasby's output includes:

- A small number of publications, such as the novel Project Jove, published as by John Glasby.
- Approximately 25 speculative fiction novels, using pseudonyms such as "A. J. Merak" or "J. L. Powers" and the Badger house names "John E. Muller", "Karl Zeigfreid" and "Victor La Salle". (Using the La Salle pseudonym, Glasby wrote Twilight Zone (1954), which, whilst unconnected to the American TV series of that name, preceded it in title use by five years.)
- More than 30 western novels using the house name "Chuck Adams", and ten as "Tex Bradley".
- 34 hospital romance novels published using the pseudonym "D.K. Jennings".
- Two crime novels and six desert adventure novels, all using the pseudonym "A.J. Merak".
- Six James Bond-style spy novels published using the pseudonym "Manning K. Robertson".
- An unknown number (possibly as many as a hundred) War stories set during World War II and published using many different pseudonyms.
- A large number of supernatural short stories and a few novels, many in the "Cthulhu Mythos".
- Encyclopedia of the Alkaloids. Volume 1-4 (non-fiction).
