= Scoops (magazine) =

Weekly British science fiction magazine

- The first issue, 10 February 1934; cover art by Serge Drigin
- Editor: Haydn Dimmock
- Frequency: Weekly
- Circulation: 100,000
- Publisher: C. Arthur Pearson
- First issue: 10 February 1934
- Final issue Number: 23 June 1934; 20
- Country: UK
- Language: English

Scoops was a weekly British science fiction magazine published by Pearson's in tabloid format in 1934, edited by Haydn Dimmock. Scoops was launched as a boy's paper, and it was not until several issues had appeared that Dimmock discovered there was an adult audience for science fiction. Circulation was poor, and Dimmock attempted to change the magazine's focus to more mature material. He reprinted Arthur Conan Doyle's The Poison Belt, improved the cover art, and obtained fiction from British science fiction writers such as John Russell Fearn and Maurice Hugi, but to no avail. Pearson's cancelled the magazine because of poor sales; the twentieth issue, dated 23 June 1934, was the last. The failure of the magazine contributed to the belief that Britain could not support a science fiction magazine, and it was not until 1937, with Tales of Wonder, that another attempt was made.

== Publication history and contents ==
In the early twentieth century, British boys' story papers such as The Magnet and Boy's Magazine ranged over many different genres, including school fiction, adventure, sports, and occasionally science fiction; the magazines were popular but the quality of the fiction was low. Science fiction also sometimes appeared in magazines aimed at the adult market, such as Pearson's Magazine, launched in 1896 by the British publishing firm of C. Arthur Pearson, which intermittently carried science fiction by writers such as H.G. Wells, Arthur Conan Doyle, and George Griffith. In 1933, Odhams, a British publisher, began serializing Edgar Rice Burroughs' novels of adventure on Venus in their weekly magazine, The Passing Show. Odhams and Pearson's were rivals, and Pearson's decided to try a weekly science fiction magazine of their own, launching a boys' paper devoted to the genre the following year. W. Speaight & Sons (known as "Speaights"), a printing firm, agreed to accept lower rates for printing Scoops, in order to keep their presses running.

Cover of the 5 May 1934 issue showing the new cover design. The artist is not known.

The editor responsible for the new magazine was Haydn Dimmock, the editor of The Scout, and later the originator of "Bob-a-Job Week". Dimmock (who probably did not select the fiction himself) assumed that Scoops' readership would be young, and that no adults would be interested in reading it. His editorial in the first issue declared that Scoops would publish stories that "look ahead with the vision of Jules Verne and H.G. Wells, whose fiction stories of wonder and science, declared impossibilities at the time of publication, are now fact. Scoops ... will transport its readers from the everyday happenings into the future, with all its exceptions of development and discovery. ... Scoops will endeavour to anticipate the marvels of the age in which we live." It is possible that Dimmock and his staff were aware of American science fiction magazines, which were available in Britain as remainders, sold at stores such as Woolworth's, but if so they did not understand the new genre, instead relying on boys' fiction writers to fill the magazine. Bernard Buley, who worked as the managing editor for Scoops, was one of these, contributing Master of the Moon, which was serialized over the first eleven issues; Buley had been the editor of Boys' Magazine, which had ceased publication in January 1934. Other contributors included George E. Rochester, Stuart Martin, J.H. Stein, and Reginald Thomas, whose The Striding Terror, about a child who grew to fifty feet tall, was serialized in the first eight issues. The stories were initially anonymous, but later research by W.O.G. Lofts has identified most of the authors. The term "science fiction" was not used initially; "science stories" was how Scoops described its contents, which included stories about scientific inventions and aviation among other subgenres. Dimmock and Buley asserted that Scoops provided educational scientific content, a claim also made for the genre by Hugo Gernsback, who had launched the first science fiction magazine in the US, though in the case of Scoops there was very little justification. Filler material was included with information about inventions and technology, but there was little coverage of scientific topics.

Dimmock made an exception to the rule that authors were anonymous for A.M. Low, a well-known scientist and inventor who contributed a novel, Space, serialized in ten instalments starting with the second issue. (Note: Space received book publication in 1937 as Adrift in the Stratosphere.) The science fiction historian Mike Ashley suggests that Low's novel, which describes three boys who accidentally travel to Mars, "must have evoked considerable interest amongst the youth of 1934", but adds that "the other stories were not of that quality". British science fiction writers and fans such as John Russell Fearn, Walter Gillings, and P. E. Cleator, one of the founders of the British Interplanetary Society, contacted Pearson's and made Dimmock aware that the market for the genre was broader than he had realized, and that there were specialist writers who might submit stories to Scoops. Cleator had already supplied an article to Dimmock on interplanetary travel, and he began a column on the same topic. Pearson's knew that Scoops' circulation was falling, and made the attempt to change course. Dimmock began to include the names of the authors on the stories, the cover was redesigned for the thirteenth issue (dated 5 May), and fiction was obtained from Fearn, Maurice Hugi, and W.P. Cockcroft. Cockcroft's "Cataclysm", in the 28 April issue, proved popular, and a sequel, "City of Mars", appeared in the 19 June issue. Conan Doyle's The Poison Belt, which began in the 5 May issue, was "unquestionably the finest story to appear in Scoops" according to the science fiction historian Everett Bleiler; it had originally appeared in The Strand Magazine in 1913. However, most of the fiction was little improved. The cover art was mostly unsigned, but Serge Drigin contributed the first two covers, and E.P. Kinsella was responsible for one. The cover art improved after the change in policy, with rotogravured covers and more realistic depictions.

The changes Dimmock made did not reverse the trend. Dimmock later told Gillings that "demand was not sufficient to give us confidence for the future", and Pearson's closed the magazine down. The last issue was dated 23 June 1934. Bleiler records that Speaights also found more profitable work for their presses, and this contributed to Pearson's decision. Although it had never been targeted at adult readers, the failure of Scoops made it appear that Britain was not a viable market for a science fiction magazine. There was apparently enough British interest in American science fiction for Hugo Gernsback to devote the letter column of the August 1935 issue of Wonder Stories to letters from British readers, but when one of those letters, from James Dudley, suggested that the time was right for a British publisher to start a science fiction title, the editor, Charles Hornig, replied that Scoops' failure "proved to us and other British publishers that [the UK] is not yet prepared to support a professional science-fiction magazine enough to make it pay for itself". Gillings later described Scoops as "the biggest blunder that British science fiction ever made", but, in Bleiler's opinion, the British market was not economically capable of supporting a science fiction magazine at the time. Despite the setback, another publisher, Newnes, considered launching a science fiction magazine in 1935, though their plans were delayed until 1938. Gillings himself was the editor of the next British science fiction title, Tales of Wonder, which published its first issue in 1937, while Newnes' magazine, Fantasy, appeared the following year.

== Bibliographic details ==
Scoops was published by C. Arthur Pearson of London. The schedule was weekly; the first issue was dated 10 February 1934, and the run ended on 23 June 1934 with the twentieth issue. Haydn Dimmock was the editor for all of Pearson's juvenile papers, including Scoops, though he was not credited in the magazine. Bernard Buley was on the editorial staff, taking on the role of the managing editor. Scoops was printed in tabloid format; each issue was 28 pages and was priced at 2d. The print run was 100,000 copies weekly. Distribution was weak, and the magazine is now rare and commands high prices.

Five stories from Scoops, along with eight other new stories, appeared in a 1937 collection from Pearson's titled The Boys' World of Adventure; the illustrations from Scoops, by Serge Drigin, were included. The new stories might have been bought for Scoops prior to its demise.

== Sources ==
- Ashley, Mike (1985). "Scoops". In Tymn, Marshall B.; Ashley, Mike (eds.). Science Fiction, Fantasy, and Weird Fiction Magazines. Westport, Connecticut: Greenwood Press. pp. 562–565. ISBN 978-0-313-21221-5.
- Ashley, Mike (2000). The Time Machines: The Story of the Science-Fiction Pulp Magazines from the beginning to 1950. Liverpool: Liverpool University Press. ISBN 978-0-85323-865-2.
- Ashley, Mike (2004). "The Gernsback Days". In Ashley, Mike; Lowndes, Robert A.W. (eds.). The Gernsback Days: A Study of the Evolution of Modern Science Fiction From 1911 to 1936. Holicong, Pennsylvania: Wildside Press. pp. 16–254. ISBN 978-0-8095-1055-9.
- Bleiler, Everett F. (1998). Science-Fiction: The Gernsback Years. Westport, Connecticut: Kent State University Press. ISBN 978-0-87338-604-3.
- Reed, David (1997). The Popular Magazine in Britain and the United States: 1880–1960. Toronto: University of Toronto Press. ISBN 978-0-8020-4214-9.
