= Lionel Fanthorpe =

British writer

The Reverend Lionel Fanthorpe
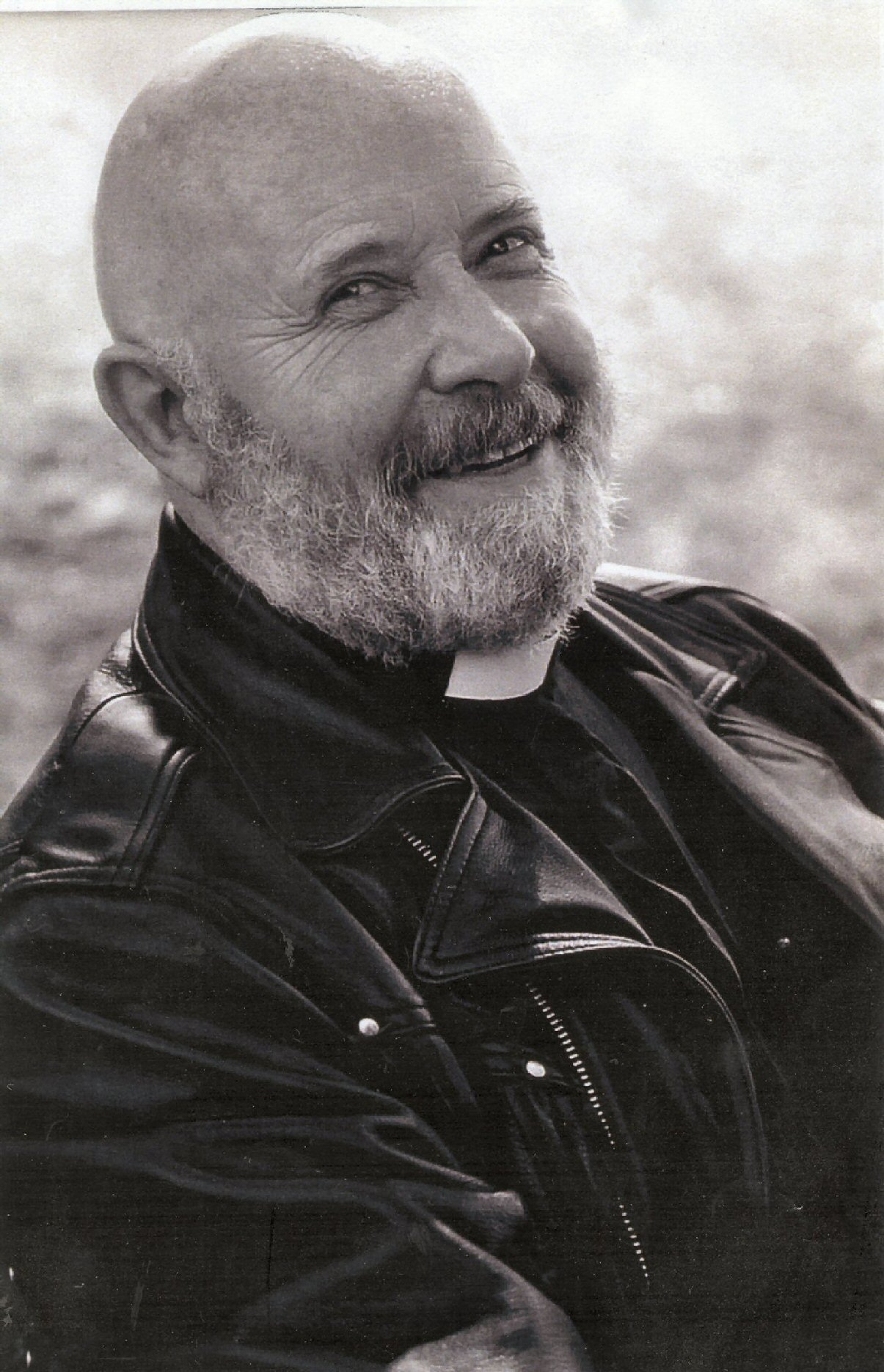
- Fanthorpe in 2013
- Born: 9 February 1935 (age 91)
- Education: Barnard Castle School; Hamond's Grammar School; Open University
- Occupations: teacher; author; priest; presenter
- Spouse: Patricia
- Children: 2

Robert Lionel Fanthorpe (born 9 February 1935) is a retired British priest and entertainer. Fanthorpe also worked as a dental technician, journalist, teacher, television presenter, author and lecturer. Born in Dereham in Norfolk, he lives in Cardiff in South Wales, where he served as Director of Media Studies and tutor/lecturer in Religious Studies at the Cardiff Academy sixth form college.

== Biography ==
Lionel Fanthorpe was educated at Barnard Castle School and Hamond's Grammar School in Swaffham. He left school aged 15 and married Patricia Alice Tooke (born 1938) in 1957. For a period he worked as a journalist on the Norfolk Chronicle and then as a van driver and warehouseman at Hamerton's Stores in Dereham, taking his A-levels by private study at home and by correspondence courses. He attended the teacher-training course at Keswick Hall College in Norwich between 1961 and 1963, where he achieved Distinctions in Educational Theory and Practice and in Advanced Main Theology as part of his Certificate in Education.

Fanthorpe was a schoolmaster at Dereham Secondary Modern School from 1958 to 1961 and again from 1963 to 1967, and a Further Education Tutor based at Gamlingay Village College from 1967 to 1969. He was Industrial Training Manager for the Phoenix Timber Group of Companies in Rainham from 1969 to 1972, Head of English and then Deputy Headteacher at Hellesdon High School near Norwich from 1972 to 1979, and Headmaster of Glyn Derw High School in Cardiff from 1979 to 1989. He has a BA in Arts & Social Sciences from the Open University. He was ordained as a non-stipendiary Anglican priest in the Church in Wales in 1987, is also a minister of the Universal Life Church, and was also at one time a Freemason in Bowers Lodge in Norwich.

He is the author or co-author of more than 250 books. He has been president of the British UFO Research Association and is the president of the Association for the Scientific Study of Anomalous Phenomena. He presented Channel 4's Fortean TV and has made many appearances at Fortean Times magazine's UnCon, most recently in October 2004 when he gave a talk on "The Knights Templar and their Ancient Secrets". He is a Fellow of the College of Preceptors and the Chartered Management Institute.

He is a member of the high IQ society Mensa and the paranormal research society the Ghost Club. In addition, Fanthorpe is a Dan Grade martial arts instructor and a weight-training instructor. He has been a frequent guest of the late night American radio talk show Coast to Coast AM.

Fanthorpe was Director of Media Studies and teacher of Religious Studies at the sixth form college the Cardiff Academy in Cardiff in South Wales. In 2013 he appeared in the Yesterday series Forbidden History presented by Jamie Theakston.

== Family life ==
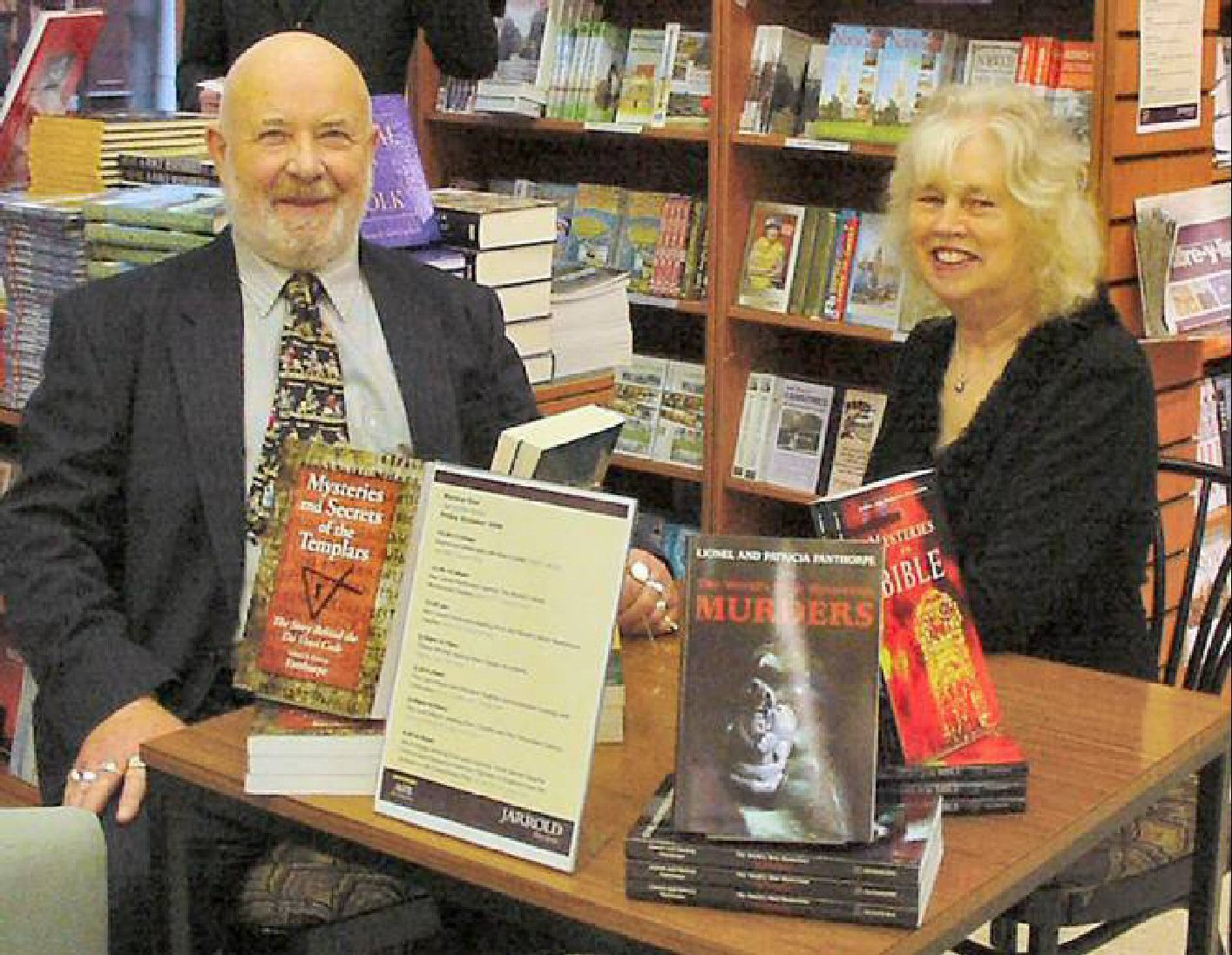
Lionel and Patricia Fanthorpe

Fanthorpe's wife Patricia is also his agent, manager and business partner. Moreover, they co-authored a number of books, including Rennes-le-Chateau: Its Mysteries and Secrets (1991), The Oak Island Mystery: The Secret of the World's Greatest Treasure Hunt (1995), The World's Most Mysterious People (Mysteries and Secrets) (1998), Mysteries of Templar Treasure and the Holy Grail: The Secrets of Rennes Le Chateau (2004), Mysteries and Secrets of the Templars: The Story Behind the Da Vinci Code (2005), Mysteries and Secrets of the Masons: The Story Behind the Masonic Order (2006), Satanism & Demonology: Mysteries and Secrets (2011), The Joan of Arc Mysteries (2019), Garan of the Veneti (2019), Parables of the Pond (2019), Earth, Sky and Sea (2019) and Thoughts and Prayers for Stressful Times (2019).

Today, the couple live in Roath in Cardiff. They have two daughters, Stephanie Dawn Patricia Fanthorpe (born 1964), and Fiona Mary Patricia Alcibiadette Fanthorpe (born 1966).

== Television, radio and film appearances ==
=== Television ===
Year	Title	Role
1997	Fortean TV	Presenter
1999	The Real Nostradamus	Presenter
1999	I'll See You When I Get There	Presenter
1999	St Nectan's Glen	Presenter
2000	Castles of Horror	Presenter
2000	Stations of the Cross	Presenter
2000	Lamarr's Attacks	Himself
2000	Encounters with the Unexplained	Himself
2001	Holy Quiz	Presenter
2002	The Marvellous Handshake	Himself
2003	Talking Stones	Presenter
2004	This Morning	Himself
2005	The Heaven and Earth Show	Himself
2006	Comedy Lab	Himself
2006	The Omen: Prophecy Fulfilled, documentary	Himself
2008	Bloodline	Himself
2008	Unexplained with George Noory	Himself
2013	Forbidden History, Season One	Himself
2014	Forbidden History, Season Two	Himself
2014	Secrets of the Bible	Himself
2014	Ancient Aliens	Himself
2016	Forbidden History, Season Three	Himself

=== Radio ===
Lionel Fanthorpe wrote and narrated several episodes of The Fanthorpe Investigations for BBC Radio (Sounds).

== Writing ==
Fanthorpe's output can be grouped under three broad headings, as follows:

- Approximately 180 paperback novels and short-story collections, in the science fiction and supernatural genres, produced for the UK publisher Badger Books during the 1950s and 1960s.
- Numerous books on Christian themes, including the "Thoughts and Prayers" series.
- Compilations of Forteana (generally with the word "mystery", "mysteries" or "mysterious" in the title), co-written with his wife Patricia.

=== Badger Books ===
Fanthorpe began working for Badger Books in the early 1950s, and over the period of the next 15 years produced many books under different pseudonyms, some of which were pen-names shared with other of Badger Books' writers. These included: Victor La Salle, John E. Muller, and Karl Zeigfreid. Pseudonyms exclusive to Fanthorpe's short story output include Neil Balfort, Othello Baron, Noel Bertram, Oben Leterth, Elton T. Neef, Peter O'Flinn, René Rolant, Robin Tate, and Deutero Spartacus. Names he used for novels include Erle Barton, Lee Barton, Thornton Bell, Leo Brett, Bron Fane, L.P. Kenton, Phil Nobel, Lionel Roberts, Neil Thanet, Trebor Thorpe, Pel Torro, and Olaf Trent. Using several of these pen names, he would often even write the entire contents of a pulp magazine such as "Supernatural Stories".

The exact number of books and stories Fanthorpe wrote for Badger Books is not known, but is estimated to be in excess of 180, 89 of which were written in a three-year period – an average of a 158-page book every 12 days.

During his time at Badger Books, Fanthorpe was essentially a small cog in a large publishing machine. The way the company worked was to acquire the cover art before the book was written, and send it to the author who then had to write a story about the cover. In some cases, Badger Books re-used cover art that had been produced to illustrate completely different novels. For example, Fanthorpe's 1960 novel Hand of Doom was written to suit a cover that had been produced to illustrate John Brunner's Slavers of Space, which formed one-half of Ace double D-421.

Although generally based on situations and plots familiar from pulp fiction, the novels and stories also used academic and pseudo-academic facts to fill out their background, including the mythology of Ancient Egypt (The Eye of Karnak), Babylon (Unknown Destiny), India (Vengeance of Siva) and Greece (Negative Minus).

The stories also demonstrate the author's interest in Fortean subjects, such as vimanas (The Negative Ones), Chase Vault and the Devil's Footprints (U.F.O. 517), the disappearances of Benjamin Bathurst (Time Echo) and the crew of the Mary Celeste (Barrier 346), as well as the career of Charles Fort himself (The X-Machine). Another novel that discusses Charles Fort explicitly (both in the text and in the back-cover blurb) is Forbidden Planet. This latter novel has no connection with the famous film of the same title, but instead describes a vast interstellar chess game played by superhuman entities using human beings as pawns.

Other novels are pastiches of accepted works of the Western Canon – Beyond the Void is a loose rewrite of Shakespeare's play The Tempest, and in Negative Minus the characters Suessydo and Epolenep re-enact Homeric tales.

=== Wordcatcher Publishing ===
As of 2019, Lionel and his wife began writing for Wordcatcher Publishing, a publishing house based in Cardiff, Wales. So far, under this partnership, they have released the historical fiction titles The Joan of Arc Mysteries and Garan of the Veneti, in addition to multiple books in the 'Thoughts and Prayers' series. Alongside these are a collection of poems, Earth, Sea and Sky, plus a children's book called Parables of the Pond, the latter of which was published under the Auxillium Press imprint.
