= Joseph Wirt Tillotson =

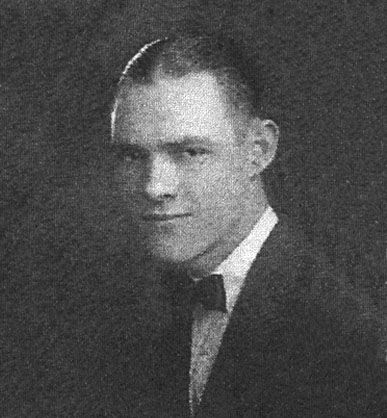
- Born: January 30, 1905; Greenville, Mississippi, U.S.
- Died: September 1, 1959 (aged 54)
- Resting place: Greenville, Mississippi, U.S.
- Other names: Robert Fuqua
- Occupation: Pulp artist/illustrator
- Spouse: Marian Tillotson

Joseph Wirt Tillotson (January 30, 1905 – September 1, 1959) was an American pulp painter and illustrator who used the name Robert Fuqua in his works.

== Biography ==
Joseph Wirt Tillotson was born January 30, 1905, in Greenville, Mississippi, to parents William Wirt Tillotson and Belle Fuqua Oursler. Between 1938 and 1951, Tillotson painted an estimated 80 covers for the pulp magazine Amazing Stories. Between 1949 and the late 1950s, he illustrated stories for Our Bible in Pictures published by David C. Cook.

He married Marian Tillotson, a sociology professor at the University of Chicago. They had no children. Tillotson died of liver cancer on September 1, 1959.
