= Badger Books =

British publisher (1960–1967)

Badger Books was an imprint used by the British publisher John Spencer & Co. between 1960 and 1967. Badger Books were published in a number of genres, predominantly war, westerns, romance, supernatural and science fiction. The best-known author of Badger Books is Lionel Fanthorpe, who wrote a large proportion of the supernatural and science fiction titles.

== History ==
Badger Books SF-58 and SF-61, both dating from 1961 and bearing the byline "John E. Muller" -- but "The Mind Makers" is by Lionel Fanthorpe and "Alien" is by John Glasby.

Samuel Assael (born 1920) set up his London-based publishing company, John Spencer & Co., in 1947. Initially Spencer's output consisted of pulp magazines, mainly in the science fiction genre (with titles like Futuristic Science Stories, Tales of Tomorrow *and Wonders of the Spaceways). However, with the decline of the pulp magazine and rise of the paperback, Spencer switched to paperback publishing in the mid-1950s. He used a number of imprints, including "John Spencer", "Cobra" and "Badger", but the last of these has become the best known. The Badger Books imprint was discontinued in 1967 although Spencer continued to produce a small number of books (often reprints) until the late 1970s.

In common with other "pulp" or mass-market publishers of the time, Badger Books focused on quantity rather than quality. A new title in each of the major genres appeared each month, generally written to tight deadlines by low-paid authors. One of the most remarkable facts about Badger Books is that much of its outputs was produced by just two authors (using a range of house names and other pseudonyms): John Glasby (over 300 novels and short stories) and Lionel Fanthorpe (over 200 novels and stories).

The company was based in Shepherd’s Bush in West London. It ran on a shoestring with Mr Assael overseeing everything. The accounts were overseen by Assaels partner Maurice Nahum. Employees numbered only three, all young men. One worked in the office with Nahum and the other two packed books. David Andersen (the source of this information) worked for this company between 1961 and 1963 mostly in the office with Maurice Nahum.

== Genres ==
The bulk of Badger Books' output fell into five genres as follows:

- Westerns, published as "Lariat Westerns" (LW-1 to LW-77) and "Blazing Westerns" (BW-1 to B-60). Many of these novels appeared under the house name "Chuck Adams", which was used by John Glasby and others. At least two of the Chuck Adams books, and several of the other western titles, were written by E. C. Tubb, who later became better known as a science fiction author.
- War stories (WW-1 to WW-163). Generally set during the Second World War, most of these novels were written by John Glasby using a wide range of pseudonyms.
- Romance novels (RS-1 to RS-40). The bulk of these were written by John Glasby under the pseudonym of D. K. Jennings.
- Supernatural Stories (SN-1 to SN-109). Many of these were written by Lionel Fanthorpe under a variety of pseudonyms. Unlike the other series (which are mostly novels), the SN books started out as a paperback format magazine containing short stories and sometimes novelettes. Issues containing just one novella or a short novel started to appear as "Supernatural Specials" with issues 29, 32 and 35, and then all the even-numbered issues from SN-40 onwards.
- Science Fiction (SF-1 to SF-118). Like the SN series, many of the SF books were written by Lionel Fanthorpe and also by John S. Glasby, the works of both often being published under pseudonyms. Many of these books appeared under house names, such as "John E. Muller", which was used by both Fanthorpe and Glasby.

In addition to these five main genres, there were several other short-lived series such as Crime stories (CS-1 to CS-13) and Spy stories (SP-1 to SP-6). The latter books, dating from 1965 to 1967, were intended to "cash-in" on the then-current James Bond craze. All six of the Spy books were written by John Glasby under the pseudonym of Manning K. Robertson.
