= Haydn Dimmock =

British magazine editor

Frederick Haydn Dimmock
- Born: 15 December 1895; Luton
- Died: 26 April 1955 (aged 59); Welwyn Garden City
- Occupations: Magazine editor children's author
- Known for: Supporter of the Boy Scouts Association

Frederick Haydn Dimmock MBE (15 December 1895 – 26 April 1955) was a British Scouting and science fiction magazine editor, writer of children's literature and supporter of the Boy Scouts Association.

== Early life ==
Haydn Dimmock was born in Luton in Bedfordshire and began his education at Enfield, which was then in Middlesex. Dimmock's first encounter with Scouting came in 1909, when a schoolmaster gave him a copy of an early edition of The Scout, which he was told was better than "the trash which I so very often have to confiscate". Dimmock was immediately enthralled, and finding that there was no local Scout troop, started his own patrol. Shortly afterwards, his parents moved to Musselburgh where there was a Scout troop, but later they returned to Enfield. There, Dimmock joined the 5th Enfield Scouts in 1911; he edited the troop's magazine which was so successful that it led to an introduction to Percy Everett, later the Deputy Chief Scout and the editor-in-chief at C. Arthur Pearson, Ltd., the publisher of The Scout. Dimmock was taken on at Pearson's in the post of "office boy".

== The Scout ==
Dimmock served with the British Army during the First World War and was wounded. On his return from military service he became the editor of the magazine The Scout, a position he would hold for 35 years. During his time with the magazine, Dimmock initiated a number of ventures to promote both the magazine and Scouting in general like running a daily Scout newspaper at the 3rd World Scout Jamboree, persuading Ralph Reader to produce his Gang Shows in a West End theatre, organising Scout "Train Cruises" around the United Kingdom, introducing the soap box derby from America, and devising "Bob-a-Job Week", an annual fundraising campaign in which Scouts did small jobs in the community in return for a donation of a shilling or "bob" (equal to 5 new pence). In 1940, publication of The Scout was taken over by the Boy Scouts Association and Dimmock became a member of the Imperial Headquarters staff. In the following year, he was appointed to the additional role of Acting Publicity Secretary.

== Science fiction ==
The first British science fiction magazine was launched in 1934, when Pearson's launched Scoops, a weekly in tabloid format aimed at the juvenile market. Soon Dimmock, Scoops' editor, began to receive more sophisticated stories, targeted at an adult audience; he tried to change the magazine's focus to include more mature fiction but within twenty issues falling sales led Pearson's to kill the magazine. The failure of Scoops gave British publishers the impression that Britain could not support a science fiction publication.

== Other work ==
Dimmock penned a total of sixteen popular junior Scout novels, including 'Hazard Hike' and 'Scout Family Robinson', three adventure novels about the Mounties, together with a number of Scout instructional handbooks and an autobiography. He wrote and directed a documentary film about the Scout Movement, Knights of Freedom, which was released in 1947.

Dimmock was made a Member of the Order of the British Empire "for services to the Boy Scouts Association" in the 1951 New Year Honours. He died on 26 April 1955, only a year after his retirement. His obituary in the May 1955 edition of The Scouter was written by Lord Rowallan, the Chief Scout, who paid tribute to Dimmock's skill as an orator, artist and innovator, and concluded: "...thank God for that life, short by modern standards but so rich in achievement. Goodbye, Dim, and thank you".

== Published books ==
- Peewits of Pinhoe (1915)
- The Clue of the Ivory Claw (1919)
- Scouts' Book of Heroes (1919)
- The Lost Trooper (1928)
- The Man from Freezing Point (1923)
- The Scout's Book (1924)
- Just a Line. Letters to a Scout (1925)
- The Caravan Scouts (1926)
- Pat of the Pony Express (1927)
- The Camp-Fire Book (1927)
- Lone Scouts of Crusoe Island (1928)
- Everyday Things You Want to Know (1930)
- Lefty-Lone Scout (1935)
- The Secret of Gaunt House (with Michael Poole, 1935)
- Omnibus of Dog Stories (1937)
- Carry on, Hilbury! (1939)
- Ghost Husky (1939)
- Hazard Hike (1939)
- Dupree in Alaska (1939)
- Bare Knee Days (autobiography, 1939)
- Rivals of Parham (1939)
- Always a Scout (1940)
- Bruce the Troop Dog (1940)
- Bruce-Detective (1941)
- Jamboree Journey (1948)
- Stories for Boys (1948)
- Dupree's Tenderfoot (1949)
- Always a Scout (1950)
- The Troop with a Bad Name (1950)
- The Scout's How-to-do-it Book (1953)
- Camping Tips and Gadgets (1953)
- Things a Scout Can Do (1953)
- Scouting Dodges (1953)
- Scout Family Robinson (1954)
- Bruce Again: Further Adventures Of Bruce The Troop Dog (1955)
