= John Russell Fearn =

British writer

- c. 1948
- Born: 1908
- Died: 1960 (aged 51–52)
- Occupation: Writer (novelist)
- Writing career
- Pen name: Vargo Statten, Thornton Ayre, Polton Cross, Geoffrey Armstrong, John Cotton, Dennis Clive, Ephriam Winiki, Astron Del Martia
- Period: 20th century
- Genres: Science fiction, western, crime

John Russell Fearn (5 June 1908 — 18 September 1960) was a British writer, one of the first to appear in American pulp science fiction magazines. A prolific author, he published his novels also as Vargo Statten and with various pseudonyms including Thornton Ayre, Polton Cross, Geoffrey Armstrong, John Cotton, Dennis Clive, Ephriam Winiki, Astron Del Martia.

== Career ==
Fearn was a prolific writer who wrote Westerns and crime fiction as well as science fiction. His writing appeared under numerous pseudonyms. He wrote series such as Adam Quirke, Clayton Drew, Golden Amazon, and Herbert. At times these drew on the pulp traditions of Edgar Rice Burroughs. His work received praise for its vividness, but criticism, being deemed "unpolished", with Arthur C. Clarke commenting in 1939 that "we must admire the magnificent, if undisciplined, fertility of his mind".

== Personal life ==
Child of a cotton salesman and a secretary, Fearn worked initially for his father's firm, followed by work as a solicitor's clerk, fairground assistant, at a munitions factory, and as a cinema projectionist. He married writer Camilla Fegan in 1957. As well as writing he was involved in writing/acting in local plays and active in writers' groups. In 1938, he told Amazing Stories that he "likes broiling sunlight and heated rooms [and] smokes incessantly while he writes". During the Second World War, Fearn was chief projectionist at the Empire Cinema in Blackpool.

== Bibliography ==
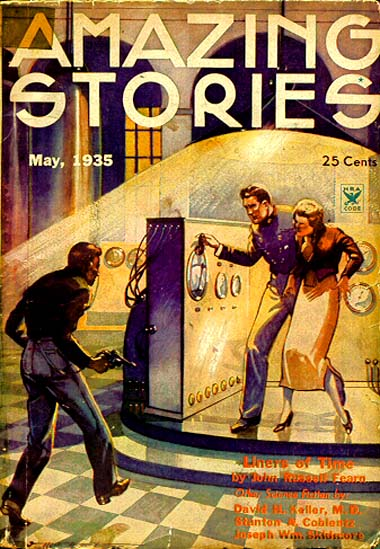
The first instalment of Fearn's novel Liners of Time took the cover of the May 1935 issue of Amazing Stories, illustrated by Leo Morey.

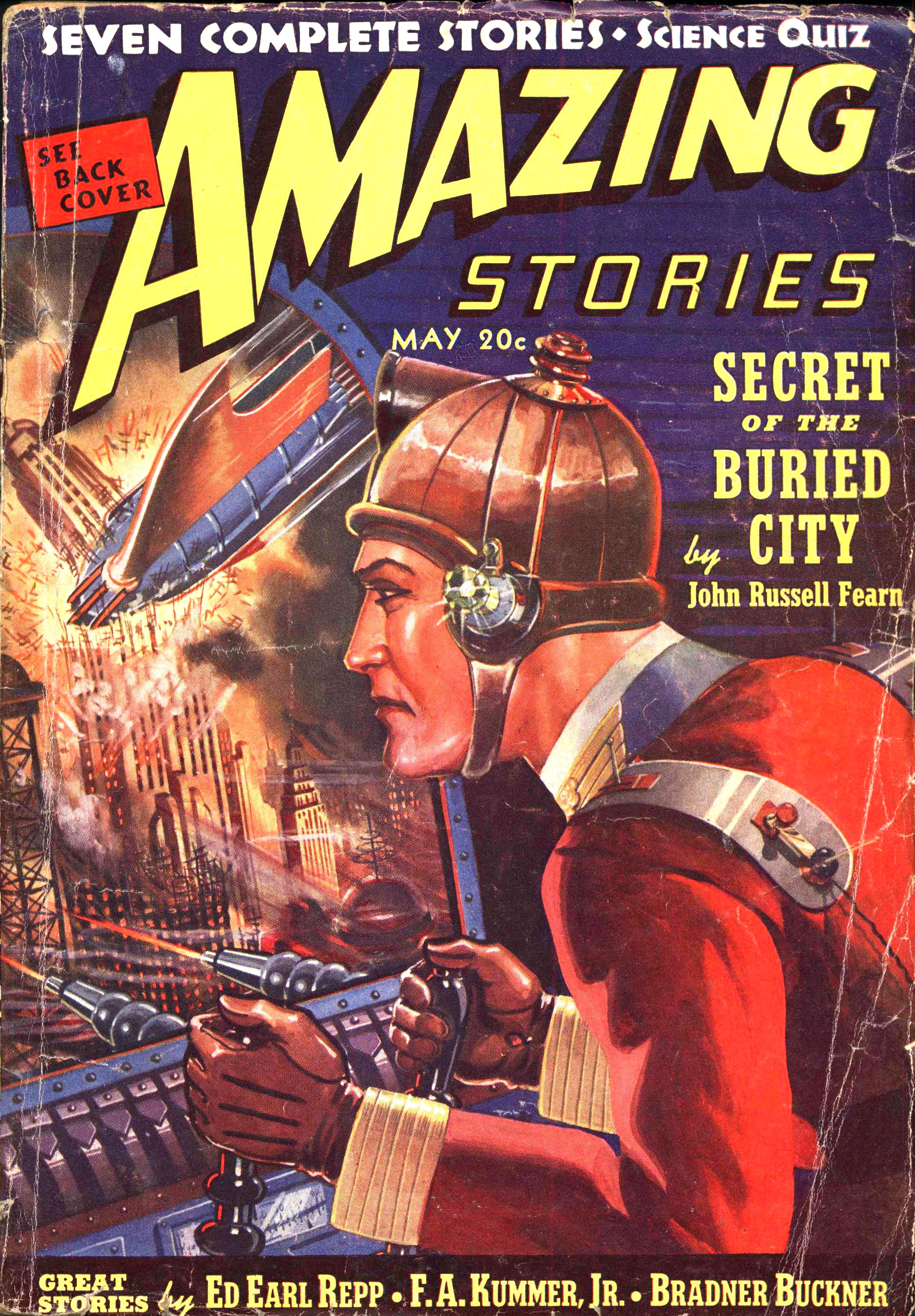
Fearn's novel Secret of the Buried City was the cover story of the May 1939 issue of Amazing Stories, illustrated by Robert Fuqua (real name Joseph Wirt Tillotson).

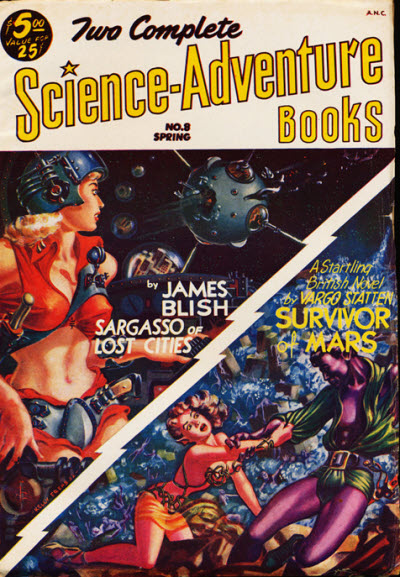
Vargo Statten's novella Survivor of Mars was originally published in Two Complete Science-Adventure Books in 1953.

=== As himself ===
- The Intelligence Gigantic (1933 Amazing Stories; 1943)
- Liners of Time (1935 Amazing Stories; 1947) and its sequel
- Zagribud (1937 Amazing Stories; cut variant title Science Metropolis as by Vargo Statten 1952)
- He Never Slept (1934 Astounding Stories; 1934)
- Nebula X (1946 as "The Multillionth Chance"; revised 1950)
- The Sun Makers (1937 as "Metamorphosis"; revised 1950)
- The Avenging Martian (1938 as "Red Heritage"; revised 1950)
- The Renegade Star (1938 as "The Blue Infinity"; revised 1951)
- The Inner Cosmos (1937 as "Worlds Within"; revised 1952)
- To the Ultimate (1936 as "Mathematica"; revised 1952)
- The Dust Destroyer (1934 as "The Man who Stopped the Dust"; revised 1953)
- The Arbiter (1947)
- The Gold of Akada (1951)
- Anjani the Mighty (1951)
- The Creature from the Black Lagoon (1954 as by Vargo Statten) novelisation of 1954 film
- Slaves of Ijax (1947 chap)
- From Afar (1982 chap)
- No Grave Need I (1984 chap)
- The Slitherers (1984 chap)

==== Golden Amazon ====
1. The Golden Amazon (1939)
2. The Amazon Fights Again (1940)
3. The Golden Amazon Returns (1945; 1949 variant title The Deathless Amazon 1953 Canada)
4. The Golden Amazon's Triumph (1946; 1953)
5. The Amazon's Diamond Quest (1947 as "Diamond Quest"; 1953)
6. Twin of the Amazon (1948; 1954)
7. The Amazon Strikes Again (1948; 1954)
8. Conquest of the Amazon (1949; 1973 chap)
9. Lord of Atlantis (1949; 1991)
10. Triangle of Power (1950)
11. Amethyst City (1951)
12. Daughter of Golden Amazon (1952)
13. Quorne Returns (1952)
14. The Central Intelligence (1953)
15. The Cosmic Crusaders (1955)
16. Parasite Planet (1955)
17. World Out of Step (1956)
18. The Shadow People (1957)
19. Kingpin Planet (1957)
20. World in Reverse (1958)
21. Dwellers in Darkness (1958)
22. World in Duplicate (1959)
23. Lord of Creation
24. Duel with Colossus
25. Standstill Planet (1960)
26. Ghost World (1961)
27. Earth Divided (1961)
28. Chameleon Planet (with Philip Harbottle)

==== Mars Quartet (Clayton Drew) ====
- Emperor of Mars (1950)
- Warrior of Mars (1950)
- Red Men of Mars (1950)
- Goddess of Mars (1950)

=== Works written under pseudonyms ===
- Whispering Satellite (1938) as by Thornton Ayre (in Astounding Stories, Jan 1938)
- What Happened to Hammond? (1951) as by Hugo Blayn
- Valley of Pretenders (circa 1942 chap US) as by Dennis Clive
- The Voice Commands (circa 1942 chap US) as by Dennis Clive
- Other Eyes Watching (1946) as by Polton Cross
- The Trembling World (1949) as by Astron Del Martia. There is another novel One Against Time as by Astron Del Martia stated to have been written by JRF. This is incorrect. It was in fact written by Stephen D. Frances.
- Don't Touch Me (1953) as by Spike Gordon
- The Dyno-Depressent (1953) as by Volsted Gridban
- Magnetic Brain (1953) as by Volsted Gridban
- Moons for Sale (1953) as by Volsted Gridban
- Scourge of the Atom (1953 as "After the Atom" by JRF; revised 1953) as by Volsted Gridban
- A Thing of the Past (1953) as by Volsted Gridban
- The Genial Dinosaur (1954)
- Exit Life (1941 as "The World in Wilderness" as by Thornton Ayre; revised 1953) as by Volsted Gridban
- The Master Must Die (1953) as by Volsted Gridban
- The Lonely Astronomer (partly based on "Death at the Observatory" as by JRF; 1954) as by Volsted Gridban
- The Purple Wizard (1953) as by Volsted Gridban
- The Frozen Limit (1954) as by Volsted Gridban
- I Came - I Saw - I Wondered (1954) as by Volsted Gridban
- Liquid Death (1954) as by "Griff"
- Cosmic Exodus (1953 chap) as by Conrad G. Holt
- Dark Boundaries (1953) as by Paul Lorraine
- The Hell-Fruit (1953 chap) as by Lawrence F. Rose
- Account Settled (1949) as by John Russell
- Z-Formations (1953) as by Brian Shaw

=== Work written under the name Vargo Statten ===
- Operation Venus (1950)
- Annihilation (1950)
- The Micro-Men (1950)
- Wanderer of Space (1950)
- 2000 Years On (1950)
- Inferno! (1950)
- The Cosmic Flame (1950)
- Cataclysm (Statten)|Cataclysm (1944 as "The Devouring Tide" as by Polton Cross; revised 1951)
- The Red Insects (1951)
- The New Satellite (1951)
- Deadline to Pluto (1951)
- The Petrified Planet (1951)
- Born of Luna (1951)
- The Devouring Fire (1951)
- The Catalyst (1951)
- The Space Warp (1952)
- The Eclipse Express (1952)
- The Time Bridge (1942 as "Prisoner of Time" by Polton Cross; revised 1952)
- The Man from Tomorrow (1950 as "Stranger in our Midst" by JRF; revised 1952)
- The G-Bomb (1941 as "The Last Secret Weapon" by Polton Cross; revised 1952)
- Laughter in Space (1939 as "Laughter out of Space" by Dennis Clive; revised 1952)
- Across the Ages (1952 as "Glimpse" by JRF; 1952 chap)
- The Last Martian (1952 chap)
- Worlds to Conquer (1952 chap)
- De-Creation (1952 chap)
- The Time Trap (1952 chap)
- Ultra Spectrum (1953)
- Black-Wing of Mars (1953 as "Winged Pestilence" by JRF; 1953)
- Man in Duplicate (1953)
- Zero Hour (1952 as "Deadline" by JRF; 1953)
- The Black Avengers (1953)
- Odyssey of Nine (1953)
- Pioneer 1990 (1940 as "He Conquered Venus" by JRF; revised 1953)
- The Interloper (1953)
- Man of Two Worlds (1953)
- The Lie Destroyer (1953)
- Black Bargain (1953)
- The Grand Illusion (1953)
- Wealth of the Void (1954)
- A Time Appointed (1954)
- I Spy (1954)
- The Multi-Man (1954)
- 1,000 Year Voyage (1954)
- Earth 2 (1955)

== Writing about Fearn ==
- The Multi-Man (1968 chap) by Philip Harbottle
- Science Fiction and Fantasy Literature, Volume 2 by R. Reginald

== See also ==
- Ron Turner – an illustrator closely associated with the Vargo Statten pseudonym
- Vargo Statten Science Fiction Magazine
