= The Road to Science Fiction =

Series of science fiction anthologies edited by James Gunn

The Road to Science Fiction is a series of science fiction anthologies edited by American science fiction author, scholar and editor James Gunn. Composed as a textbook set to teach the evolution of science fiction literature, the series is now available as mass market publications. The six-volume set collects many of the most influential works of the genre. It was published originally by Signet and then by White Wolf Games Studio. Volumes 1 through 4 are currently being reprinted in paperback format by the company Scarecrow Press.

== Reception ==
Everett Franklin Bleiler described the first two volumes as follow: "A historical anthology... A good selection, with good headnotes".

Volume 1 and 2 was also reviewed by:

- David Mogen (1979) in Science Fiction & Fantasy Book Review, July 1979
- Joseph Nicholas (1980) in Vector 99

Volume 3 was reviewed by:

- Thomas A. Easton [as Tom Easton] (1980) in Analog Science Fiction/Science Fact, July 1980
- Joseph Nicholas (1980) in Vector 99

Volume 4 was reviewed by:

- Neil Barron (1983) in Science Fiction & Fantasy Book Review, #11, January-February 1983
- Frank Borsch (1994) in Blizz, #29 (in German)
- Clinton Lawrence (1997) in Science Fiction Weekly, 5 May 1997
- Thomas A. Easton [as Tom Easton] (1997) in Analog Science Fiction and Fact, September 1997

Volume 5 was reviewed by:

- Clinton Lawrence (1998) in Science Fiction Weekly, 18 May 1998
- Steven H Silver (1998) in SF Site, Mid-May 1998, (1998)
- Damien Broderick (1999) in The New York Review of Science Fiction, April 1999

== Contents ==
=== Volume 1: From Gilgamesh to Wells ===
- A True Story by Lucian of Samosata
- The Voyages and Travels of Sir John Mandeville (excerpt) by an unknown author
- Utopia (excerpt) by Thomas More
- The City of the Sun (excerpt) by Tommaso Campanella
- New Atlantis (excerpt) by Francis Bacon
- Somnium by Johannes Kepler
- A Voyage to the Moon (excerpt from Comical History of the States and Empires of the Moon) by Cyrano de Bergerac
- A Voyage to Laputa (an excerpt from Gulliver's Travels) by Jonathan Swift
- The Journey to the World Underground (excerpt) by Ludvig Holberg
- "Micromégas" by Voltaire (not included in the Signet edition)
- Frankenstein (excerpt) by Mary Shelley
- "Rappaccini's Daughter" by Nathaniel Hawthorne
- "Mellonta Tauta" by Edgar Allan Poe
- "The Diamond Lens" by Fitz-James O'Brien
- Twenty Thousand Leagues Under the Seas (excerpt) by Jules Verne
- Around the Moon (excerpt) by Jules Verne
- She (excerpt) by H. Rider Haggard
- Looking Backward (excerpt) by Edward Bellamy
- "The Damned Thing" by Ambrose Bierce
- "With the Night Mail" by Rudyard Kipling
- "The Star" by H. G. Wells

The anthology was published Signet in 1979 and reprinted by Scarecrow Press in December 2002.

=== Volume 2: From Wells to Heinlein ===
- "The New Accelerator," by H. G. Wells
- "The Machine Stops, by E. M. Forster
- The Chessmen of Mars (excerpt) (Signet edition) or Under the Moons of Mars (excerpt) by Edgar Rice Burroughs
- "The People of the Pit," by A. Merritt, replaced by Merritt's "The Moon Pool" in the Scarecrow Press edition (2002)
- "The Red One," by Jack London
- "Dagon" by H. P. Lovecraft
- "The Tissue-Culture King" by Julian Huxley
- "The Revolt of the Pedestrians" by David H. Keller, M.D.
- Last and First Men (excerpt) by Olaf Stapledon
- Brave New World (excerpt) by Aldous Huxley
- "A Martian Odyssey" by Stanley G. Weinbaum
- "Twilight," by John W. Campbell
- "Proxima Centauri" by Murray Leinster
- "What's It Like Out There?," by Edmond Hamilton
- "With Folded Hands" by Jack Williamson
- "Hyperpilosity" by L. Sprague de Camp
- "The Faithful" by Lester del Rey
- "Black Destroyer," by A. E. van Vogt
- "Nightfall" by Isaac Asimov
- "Requiem" by Robert A. Heinlein

Published by Signet, 1979, reprinted by Scarecrow Press, September, 2002.

=== Volume 3: From Heinlein to Here ===
Contained work published between 1940 and 1977.

- "All You Zombies" by Robert A. Heinlein
- "Reason" by Isaac Asimov
- "Desertion"' by Clifford D. Simak
- "Mimsy Were the Borogoves" by Lewis Padgett (Henry Kuttner and C. L. Moore)
- "The Million-Year Picnic" by Ray Bradbury
- "Thunder and Roses" by Theodore Sturgeon
- "That Only a Mother" by Judith Merril
- "Brooklyn Project," by William Tenn (Philip Klass)
- "Coming Attraction" by Fritz Leiber
- "The Sentinel" by Arthur C. Clarke
- "Sail On! Sail On!" by Philip José Farmer
- "Critical Factor" by Hal Clement
- "Fondly Fahrenheit" by Alfred Bester
- "The Cold Equations" by Tom Godwin
- "The Game of Rat and Dragon," by Cordwainer Smith
- "Pilgrimage to Earth" by Robert Sheckley
- "Who Can Replace a Man?" by Brian W. Aldiss
- "Harrison Bergeron" by Kurt Vonnegut, Jr.
- "The Streets of Ashkelon" by Harry Harrison
- "The Terminal Beach" by J. G. Ballard
- "Dolphin's Way," by Gordon R. Dickson
- "Slow Tuesday Night" by R. A. Lafferty
- "Day Million," by Frederik Pohl
- "We Can Remember It for You Wholesale," by Philip K. Dick
- "I Have No Mouth, and I Must Scream," by Harlan Ellison
- "Aye, and Gomorrah," by Samuel R. Delany
- "The Jigsaw Man," by Larry Niven
- "Kyrie," by Poul Anderson
- "Masks," by Damon Knight
- Stand on Zanzibar (excerpt) by John Brunner
- "The Big Flash" by Norman Spinrad
- "Sundance," by Robert Silverberg
- The Left Hand of Darkness (excrpt) by Ursula K. Le Guin
- "When It Changed," by Joanna Russ
- "The Engine at Heartspring's Center," by Roger Zelazny
- "Tricentennial" by Joe Haldeman

First published by Signet in 1979, reprinted by Scarecrow Press, May 2002.

=== Volume 4: From Here to Forever ===
- "Born of Man and Woman," by Richard Matheson
- "The Luckiest Man in Denv," by C. M. Kornbluth (not included in the Signet edition)
- "Common Time," by James Blish (not included in the Signet edition)
- "My Boy Friend's Name is Jello," by Avram Davidson
- "The First Canticle," by Walter M. Miller, Jr.
- "Nobody Bothers Gus," by Algis Budrys
- "Flowers for Algernon," by Daniel Keyes
- "The Moon Moth" by Jack Vance
- "The Library of Babel" by Jorge Luis Borges
- Dune (excerpt) by Frank Herbert
- "Light of Other Days," by Bob Shaw
- "The First Sally (A), or Trurl's Electronic Bard" by Stanisław Lem
- "The Heat Death of the Universe," by Pamela Zoline
- "The Planners" by Kate Wilhelm
- "The Dance of the Changer and the Three" by Terry Carr
- "The Last Flight of Dr. Ain," by James Tiptree, Jr. (Alice Sheldon)
- "Where No Sun Shines" by Gardner Dozois
- "The Island of Doctor Death and Other Stories" by Gene Wolfe
- "Angouleme" by Thomas M. Disch
- "Gather Blue Roses," by Pamela Sargent
- "With a Finger in My I," by David Gerrold
- "The Ghost Writer," by George Alec Effinger (Signet edition)
- "Of Mist, and Grass, and Sand," by Vonda N. McIntyre
- "Air Raid," by John Varley
- "Uncoupling," by Barry N. Malzberg
- "Rogue Tomato," by Michael Bishop
- "This Tower of Ashes," by George R. R. Martin
- "Particle Theory," by Edward Bryant
- "View from a Height," by Joan D. Vinge
- "The Word Sweep" by George Zebrowski
- "The World Science Fiction Convention of 2080" by Ian Watson
- "Abominable" by Carol Emshwiller
- "Exposures" by Gregory Benford
- "Schrödinger's Kitten," by George Alec Effinger (not included in the Signet edition)

First published by Signet, 1982, reprinted by White Wolf, January 1997 and Scarecrow Press, 2003)

=== Volume 5: The British Way ===
(White Wolf, March 1998)

Influential British SF published prior to 1986'

- The Battle of Dorking: Reminiscences of a Volunteer (excerpt) by Lieutenant-Colonel Sir George Tomkyns Chesney
- Flatland (excerpt) by Edwin A. Abbott
- After London; or, Wild England (excerpt) by Richard Jefferies
- "The Doom of London," by Robert Barr
- "A Corner in Lightning," by George Griffith
- "The Country of the Blind" by H. G. Wells
- "As Easy as A.B.C." by Rudyard Kipling
- "A Negligible Experiment" by John D. Beresford
- "The Horror of the Heights" by Sir Arthur Conan Doyle
- "The Rat" by S. Fowler Wright
- Star Maker (excerpt) by Olaf Stapledon
- "The Great Fog," by H. F. Heard
- "Hobbyist" by Eric Frank Russell
- "Dreams Are Sacred, by Peter Phillips
- "Made in U.S.A." by J. T. McIntosh
- "The Star" by Arthur C. Clarke
- "The Emptiness of Space," by John Wyndham
- "The Voices of Time," by J. G. Ballard
- "The Drowned Giant," by J. G. Ballard
- "The Totally Rich," by John Brunner
- "Mouth of Hell," by David I. Masson
- "The Discontinuous," by D. G. Compton
- "It's Smart to Have an English Address" by D. G. Compton
- "The Muse" by Anthony Burgess
- "The Nature of the Catastrophe," by Michael Moorcock
- "The Power of Time" by Josephine Saxton
- "Mason's Life" by Kingsley Amis
- "Settling the World" by M. John Harrison
- "Working in the Spaceship Yards," by Brian W. Aldiss
- "Appearance of Life" by Brian W. Aldiss
- "An Infinite Summer" by Christopher Priest
- "Custom Fitting" by James White
- "Written in Water" by Tanith Lee
- "The Great Atlantic Swimming Race" by Ian Watson
- "And He Not Busy Being Born" by Brian M. Stableford

=== Volume 6: Around the World ===
(White Wolf, July 1998)

==== France ====
- Journey to the Center of the Earth (excerpt) by Jules Verne
- "The War of the Twentieth Century," by Albert Robida
- "Another World" by J.-H. Rosny-Aîné
- "The Dead Fish," by Boris Vian
- "Heavier Than Sleep," by Philippe Curval
- "The Valley of Echoes," by Gérard Klein
- "The Knot," by Élisabeth Vonarburg

==== Germany ====
- "The Sandman," by E. T. A. Hoffmann
- "The Universal Library," by Kurd Lasswitz
- "The Hunter Gracchus," by Franz Kafka
- "The Building," by Herbert W. Franke
- "Loitering at Death's Door," by Wolfgang Jeschke
- "Ikaros," by Erik Simon

==== Scandinavia and Finland ====
- "Mnemosyne's Children," by Svend Åge Madsen
- "Time Everlasting," by Sam J. Lundwall

==== Eastern Europe ====
- Epilogue from R.U.R. by Karel Čapek
- "The Hunt," by Stanisław Lem (from Tales of Pirx the Pilot)
- "The Divided Carla," by Josef Nesvadba
- "That Invincible Human Spirit, or, The Golden Ships," by Alexandr Kramer
- "The Neuhof Treaty," by Ovid S. Crohmalniceanu

==== Russia ====
- "The Strangers," by Arkady and Boris Strugatsky
- "Share It With Me," by Kirill Bulychev

==== Italy ====
- "The Time Machine," by Dino Buzzati
- "Cancerqueen," by Tommaso Landolfi
- "The Spiral," by Italo Calvino

==== Spain and Latin America ====
- "The Alabaster Garden," by Teresa Inglés
- "The Babylon Lottery," by Jorge Luis Borges
- "Blacamán the Good, Vendor of Miracles," by Gabriel García Márquez
- "Chac-Mool," by Carlos Fuentes

==== India ====
- "Einstein the Second," by Laxman Londhe

==== China ====
- "The Mirror Image of the Earth," by Zheng Wenguang
- "Corrosion," by Ye Yonglie

==== Japan ====
- "Beyond the Curve," by Kōbō Abe
- "Take Your Choice," by Sakyo Komatsu
- "The Legend of the Paper Spaceship," by Tetsu Yano
