= 1999 in science fiction =

The year 1999 was marked, in science fiction, by the following:

== Events ==
- The 57th annual Worldcon, Aussiecon Three, was held in Melbourne, Australia

== Births and deaths ==
=== Deaths ===
- Ricardo Barreiro
- Marion Zimmer Bradley
- Stanley Kubrick
- Peter Kuczka

== Literary releases ==
=== Novels ===
- All Tomorrow's Parties, by William Gibson
- Battle Royale, by Koshun Takami
- Cryptonomicon, by Neal Stephenson
- Timeline, by Michael Crichton

=== Comics ===
- Planetes, by Makoto Yukimura, begins serialization in Morning magazine

== Movies ==
- Existenz, dir. by David Cronenberg
- The Iron Giant, dir. by Brad Bird
- The Matrix, dir. by The Wachowskis
- Star Wars: Episode I – The Phantom Menace, dir. by George Lucas

== Television ==
- The Big O
- Futurama

== Video games ==
- Sid Meier's Alpha Centauri

== Awards ==
=== Hugos ===
- Best novel: To Say Nothing of the Dog, by Connie Willis
- Best novella: Oceanic, by Greg Egan
- Best novelette: "Taklamakan" by Bruce Sterling
- Best short story: "The Very Pulse of the Machine" by Michael Swanwick
- Best related work: The Dreams Our Stuff Is Made Of, by Thomas M. Disch
- Best dramatic presentation: The Truman Show, dir. by Peter Weir; screenplay by Andrew Niccol
- Best professional editor: Gardner Dozois
- Best professional artist: Bob Eggleton
- Best Semiprozine: Locus, ed. by Charles N. Brown
- Best fanzine: Ansible, ed. by Dave Langford
- Best fan writer: Dave Langford
- Best fan artist: Ian Gunn

=== Nebulas ===
- Best novel: Parable of the Talents, by Octavia E. Butler
- Best novella: Story of Your Life, by Ted Chiang
- Best novelette: "Mars is No Place for Children", by Mary A. Turzillo
- Best short story: "The Cost of Doing Business", by Leslie What
- Best script: The Sixth Sense, by M. Night Shyamalan

=== Other awards ===
- BSFA Award for Best Novel: The Sky Road, by Ken Macleod
- Locus Award for Best Science Fiction Novel: To Say Nothing of the Dog, by Connie Willis
- Saturn Award for Best Science Fiction Film: The Matrix
