= Camp Concentration =

1968 novel by Thomas M. Disch

- Cover of first edition (hardcover)
- Author: Thomas M. Disch
- Language: English
- Genre: Science fiction
- Publisher: Rupert Hart-Davis
- Publication date: 1968
- Publication place: United Kingdom
- Media type: Print (hardcover)
- Pages: 177
- ISBN: 0-246-97352-8
- OCLC: 464091

Camp Concentration is a science fiction novel by American writer Thomas M. Disch. It was first serialized in four parts in New Worlds from July to October 1967 and was published in book form in the United Kingdom in 1968, followed by a first U.S. edition in 1969.

Presented as the journal of the conscientious objector Louis Sacchetti, the novel is set in a secret research prison where a compound derived from syphilis sharply increases intelligence while destroying the body. Critics have associated the novel with the New Wave, and discussion of it has emphasized its Faustian and alchemical motifs, dense literary allusiveness, and inward, experimental narrative style.

The novel received a restrained but positive contemporary notice from Kirkus Reviews. Later critics including John Clute and Carl Freedman treated it as one of Disch's major works; David Pringle included it in Science Fiction: The 100 Best Novels, and Rob Latham later grouped it among Disch's books that had come to be celebrated as classics. The novel also received Australia's Ditmar Award.

== Background and publication ==
Camp Concentration was first published as a four-part serial in the British magazine New Worlds from July to October 1967, during the period in which it was edited by Michael Moorcock. It then appeared in book form in the United Kingdom in 1968, when Rupert Hart-Davis issued the first edition in London. The first U.S. edition followed in 1969 from Doubleday, published in Garden City, New York.

The novel appeared during Disch's association with the British New Wave centered on New Worlds. In The Encyclopedia of Science Fiction, Clute described Camp Concentration as the high-water mark of Disch's involvement with British rather than American science fiction in the late 1960s. Later scholarship has likewise situated the novel within the New Wave's emphasis on formal experiment, inwardness, and literary ambition.

== Plot ==
Camp Concentration is presented as the journal of Louis Sacchetti, a poet, Catholic intellectual, and conscientious objector imprisoned during a near-future American war. After serving time in an ordinary prison for draft resistance, he is transferred to a secret military installation called Camp Archimedes, where the Army is conducting experiments in "intelligence maximization." Sacchetti is unusual among the inmates because he is a civilian rather than a soldier, and the camp authorities use him both as a test subject and as an observer who records camp life from within. On arrival he is processed by General Haast, the camp commandant, and interviewed by Dr. Aimee Busk, the resident psychiatrist.

The experiment centers on Pallidine, an intelligence-enhancing treatment derived from the syphilis spirochete. The drug produces sharp increases in memory, verbal power, analytical ability, and creative imagination, but it also guarantees physical collapse and death within months. Sacchetti gradually realizes that Camp Archimedes is both laboratory and death row, as the prisoners are being turned into geniuses even as their bodies are destroyed. At first he tries to keep an ironic distance from the program and from the other inmates, but his own infection draws him further into the camp's culture. As his intelligence expands, his journal entries become more elaborate, allusive, and unstable.

Much of the camp's daily life consists of intense intellectual production. The inmates read, debate theology, philosophy, literature, and science, translate texts, compose verse, and stage Christopher Marlowe's Doctor Faustus. The more brilliantly they think, the more fully they understand their condition. Sacchetti records these exchanges with fascination and dread. The most formidable inmate is Mordecai Washington, a charismatic and elusive prisoner whose intelligence and force of personality set him apart even among the infected men. Washington becomes the focus of Sacchetti's admiration, suspicion, and dependence.

As the months pass, Washington's ambitions extend beyond survival. He becomes associated with escape plans, revolutionary talk, and increasingly strange experiments that combine scientific ingenuity with occult and theatrical symbolism. The camp's production of Doctor Faustus reinforces the novel's atmosphere of bargain and forbidden knowledge. Sacchetti, meanwhile, is drawn into shifting relationships involving Washington, Busk, and the authorities, who appear less and less able to control what they have created. Washington is also linked to Busk in ways that matter both personally and medically. She is eventually infected, and her later disappearance suggests that the disease may no longer be confined to Camp Archimedes. Sacchetti begins to suspect that the experiment is escaping its original bounds and may be spreading into the outside world.

Near the end of the novel, Sacchetti's journal grows increasingly fragmented as his health collapses. He goes blind, suffers severe physical decline, and experiences hallucinations and lapses in coherence, even as flashes of heightened insight remain. News items and rumors suggest that the outside world is already changing. Outbreaks of unusual crimes, sudden scientific breakthroughs, and signs of contagion imply that super-intelligence is spreading into the general population. Inside the camp, tensions sharpen around Dr. Skilliman and the camp leadership, while Sacchetti's own position becomes more precarious. What had seemed to be a contained experiment now appears to threaten society beyond the camp.

The climax follows a séance-like episode connected to the camp's theatrical activities and to a strange machine initially treated as a prop. Washington appears to die, but the full meaning of the scene is revealed only later. After Sacchetti suffers a stroke and is left nearly helpless, Skilliman attempts to arrange his death under the pretense of an escape. Instead, Haast intervenes, and it is disclosed that Washington had used the machine to transfer identities, exchanging minds with Haast during the earlier performance. In the final movement, Sacchetti's own consciousness is likewise transferred into the body of a guard he has nicknamed "Assiduous." The novel closes with Sacchetti alive but displaced into another body, while the intelligence plague continues to spread beyond the camp and the possibility of a cure remains uncertain.

== Themes and analysis ==
=== Faust, alchemy, and genius ===
A recurring line of criticism treats Camp Concentration as a reworking of the Faust story. In The Encyclopedia of Science Fiction, Clute links the novel to Thomas Mann's Doctor Faustus and describes it as Disch's most sustained science-fictional invention. Samuel R. Delany also reads the book through a Faustian lens, emphasizing the way it binds intellectual ambition to corruption and decline. John Sladek makes the connection even more directly, calling it a Faust story modeled openly on Mann's novel.

Within that framework, critics have paid particular attention to the novel's treatment of genius. Ian Stuart Garlington argues that Disch organizes the idea of heightened intelligence through alchemical imagery, so that brilliance appears less as a pure mental achievement than as a transformative process marked by contamination, bodily damage, and loss. In his reading, the camp's experiment turns knowledge into something purchased at an extreme physical cost, joining scientific research to older motifs of forbidden power and dangerous exchange. Sladek similarly connects the novel's interest in genius, disease, and metamorphosis to a broader symbolic pattern in Disch's fiction.

Critics have also used this Faustian framework to explain the novel's ending. Clute notes that the climax has been sharply criticized, while Delany's discussion distinguishes between the force of the novel's central intellectual conceit and the difficulties posed by its final movement.

=== Inner space, form, and literary ambition ===
Later scholarship has situated Camp Concentration within the New Wave emphasis on inwardness, formal experiment, and literary ambition. Janez Steble places the novel within the New Wave turn toward "inner space", arguing that its subject matter is conveyed not only through plot but through techniques that register the breakdown and expansion of Louis Sacchetti's consciousness. In Steble's account, the journal form and stream-of-consciousness narration shift attention away from external action and toward the changing state of the narrator's mind.

Steble also emphasizes the novel's dense literary allusiveness, arguing that its references to writers and thinkers such as Mann, Marlowe, and Thomas Aquinas mark its distance from pulp-adventure conventions and align it with the higher-literary ambitions often associated with New Wave fiction. Delany likewise treats Disch as working in a symbolist and highly self-conscious literary mode, while Sladek reads the novel as part of a broader pattern in Disch's fiction in which recurring images of bodily confinement and escape are given increasingly elaborate formal treatment.

=== Institutions, mendacity, and the body ===
Garlington reads Camp Concentration not only as a Faust story but also as a novel shaped by the cultural context of the 1960s. He argues that it can be read as an allegory of the social significance of LSD and other hallucinogens, especially where those experiences are mediated by state institutions. In this account, Camp Archimedes is both laboratory and prison, and the novel's treatment of genius is inseparable from military control, coercion, and experimentation on captive bodies.

Freedman, writing more broadly about Disch, places the novel within what he calls a "culture of mendacity". In that framework, the book's institutional setting, official evasions, and unstable relation between truth and deception become central to its critical force. Garlington reaches a related conclusion from another direction, arguing that the novel revises the Faust story by locating the decisive bargain not in the prisoners themselves but in the researchers and authorities who create the experiment and accept its consequences for others.

== Reception ==
=== Contemporary ===
Camp Concentration received a restrained but favorable notice from Kirkus Reviews. The review emphasized the novel's journal form and its central premise, in which a treatment that produces extraordinary intelligence also destroys the body, and it described the ending as "a real shock treatment". It concluded by calling the book "a good concentrated effort".

=== Retrospective ===
Later criticism has generally treated Camp Concentration as one of Disch's major works. In a 1991 survey of modern science fiction, Clute singled out Camp Concentration and 334 as works in which Disch "shone", and wrote that Disch and Delany had written "at the highest pitch the genre could possibly demand". Freedman later argued that Camp Concentration and 334 alone would be enough to establish Disch as one of the indispensable science-fiction writers of the modern era.

The novel was also included in Pringle's Science Fiction: The 100 Best Novels. In a retrospective essay on Disch, David Auerbach foregrounded Camp Concentration among the author's key science-fiction novels and described Disch as a writer who had been "ahead of his time". In The Encyclopedia of Science Fiction, Clute described the novel as Disch's most sustained science-fictional invention, while also noting that its climax had been sharply criticized.

The novel also received Australia's Ditmar Award.

== Legacy ==
In a memorial note published in Science Fiction Studies after Disch's death, Latham grouped Camp Concentration with several of the author's other books that had come to be celebrated as classics of science fiction. In a later retrospective essay, John O'Neill described the novel as one of Disch's most acclaimed works and suggested it as a strong starting point for readers new to his fiction.

The novel has also been associated with an unusual response from Philip K. Dick. In a 2018 essay, O'Neill reproduced part of a 1972 letter that Dick sent to the Federal Bureau of Investigation, in which Dick identified Camp Concentration as a work he believed contained coded anti-American messages.
