= The Cinema of David Cronenberg =

2008 book by Ernest Mathijs

The Cinema of David Cronenberg: From Baron of Blood to Cultural Hero
- Author: Ernest Mathijs
- Language: English
- Subject: Film criticism
- Published: 2008 (Wallflower Press)
- Publication place: United Kingdom
- Media type: Print (Hardback)
- Pages: 312
- ISBN: 978-1-905674-66-4

The Cinema of David Cronenberg: From Baron of Blood to Cultural Hero is a 2008 book by Ernest Mathijs about the films of director David Cronenberg. This book focuses on director David Cronenberg’s filmography, analyzing the alternative methods Cronenberg used to create and execute his films. This book focuses on the contemporary reception of Cronenberg’s works and dives into the personal experiences that have shaped Cronenberg’s film ideologies. It discusses Cronenberg’s films at length, diving into specific films to discuss technique, content, and impact. Mathijs had previously done his Ph.D. thesis on the reception of Cronenberg's films, and this book was based on that research. Mathijs had previously done his PhD thesis on the reception of Cronenberg's films, and this book was based on that research.

== Author ==
Ernest Mathijs is a professor at the University of British Columbia, where he teaches film. According to CTV British Columbia, Ernest Mathijs’ research specialties include movie audiences, the reception of alternative cinema and cult film.

== Subject: David Cronenberg ==
David Cronenberg (born March 15, 1943) is a Canadian film director and screenwriter. According to Variety Magazine, he is credited with being one of the inventors of “body horror” — with concepts that are hypnotic, frightening, erotic, disturbing, prescient and generally provocative. In contemporary times, Cronenberg's films have attracted attention along these lines from a range of outstanding scholars, including feminist/psychoanalytic commentators, Marxist cultural critics, cultural-studies theorists, and analysts of postmodern or proto-postmodern film art.

== Book Content ==
According to Mathijs, this book provides an overview of Cronenberg's films in the light of their international reception, placing them firmly in the cultures they influenced. It showcases how Cronenberg developed a consistent cult following for his chronicles of humankind's struggle with its ever-changing environment, influenced by technology and changing social roles.

== Filmography ==
Various reviews have analyzed Cronenberg's filmography over the years. According to the book "The Artist as Monster: The Cinema of David Cronenberg," authored by William Beard, Cronenberg is more interested in neuroses and anxieties, repression and derepression, the adaptability or un-adaptability of people to strange circumstances, than he is in any social analysis, and particularly any socio-political analysis. In a New Yorker article, Adam Nayman comments that Cronenberg's œuvre encompasses a gun made of gristle that fires teeth (“eXistenZ”); a typewriter with an anus (“Naked Lunch”); weaponized armpits (“Rabid”); a chest cavity reconfigured as a VCR (“Videodrome”); and, in “The Fly,” perhaps his best-known film, a human-insect mutant played by Jeff Goldblum.

== Reception ==
Martin Fradley of Film Quarterly wrote, "Mathijs is especially successful when he looks beyond the major career landmarks" and "admirably situates the films in wider context". However, Fradley says that Mathijs focuses too much on "excessively detailed plot summaries". Dejan Ognjanovic of Beyond Hollywood wrote that it is "a study whose main value lies in exploring the reception (and misconceptions) of Cronenberg’s films, but has very little to add to clarifying them and enabling a better understanding of their essence." Science fiction critic Rob Latham wrote that the book "makes a decent stab" at a comprehensive study of Cronenberg.
