= New Wave (science fiction) =

Movement in science fiction

- Years active: 1964 (disputed) to late 1970s
- Location: Global, mainly the United States and the United Kingdom
- Major figures: Michael Moorcock, Brian W. Aldiss, J. G. Ballard, John Brunner, Philip K. Dick, Ursula K. Le Guin, Harlan Ellison, Robert Silverberg, Thomas M. Disch, Roger Zelazny, Samuel R. Delany, James Tiptree Jr., Norman Spinrad, Kurt Vonnegut, Philip José Farmer, R. A. Lafferty
- Influences: Nouvelle vague, avant garde, counterculture of the 1960s, antiwar movement, drug subculture, sexual revolution, environmentalism, surrealism, postmodernism, psychoanalysis, existentialism, Beat Generation
- Influenced: Cyberpunk, New weird, Slipstream, Feminist science fiction, Afrofuturism

The New Wave was a science fiction movement of the 1960s and 1970s, characterized by a great degree of experimentation with the form and content of stories, often influenced by the styles of non-science fiction literature, and an emphasis on the psychological and social sciences as opposed to the physical sciences. New Wave authors often considered themselves as part of the modernist tradition of fiction, and the New Wave was conceived as a deliberate change from the traditions of the science fiction characteristic of pulp magazines, which peaked during the Golden Age. Many New Wave writers considered the sci-fi of such as irrelevant or unambitious.

The most prominent source of New Wave science fiction was the British magazine New Worlds, edited by Michael Moorcock, who became editor during 1964. In the United States, Judith Merril's anthologies and Harlan Ellison's 1967 anthology Dangerous Visions are often considered as the best early representations of the movement. Worldwide, Ursula K. Le Guin, Stanisław Lem, J. G. Ballard, Samuel R. Delany, Roger Zelazny, Joanna Russ, James Tiptree Jr. (a pseudonym of Alice Bradley Sheldon), Thomas M. Disch, and Brian Aldiss were also major writers associated with the movement. Moorcock wanted writers to borrow from the genre's techniques but encouraged writers to develop their own styles. Apart from Moorcock and Ballard, authors included Hilary Bailey, Barrington Bayley, M. John Harrison, Pamela Zoline, Rachel Pollack, and Christopher Priest.

The New Wave was influenced by postmodernism, surrealism, the politics of the 1960s, such as the controversy concerning the Vietnam War, and by social trends such as the drug subculture, sexual liberation, and environmentalism. Although the New Wave was critiqued for the self-absorption of some of its writers, it was influential in the development of subsequent movements, including cyberpunk and slipstream. Authors like Michael Chabon and Hari Kunzru are also considered among later authors of New Wave fiction.

== Origins and use of the term ==
=== Origins ===
The phrase "New Wave" was used generally for new artistic fashions during the 1960s, imitating the term nouvelle vague used for certain French cinematic styles. P. Schuyler Miller, the regular book reviewer of Analog Science Fiction and Fact, first used it in the November 1961 issue to describe a new generation of British authors: "It's a moot question whether Carnell discovered the ‘big names’ of British science fiction—Wyndham, Clarke, Russell, Christopher—or whether they discovered him. Whatever the answer, there is no question at all about the ‘new wave’: Tubb, Aldiss, and to get to my point, Kenneth Bulmer and John Brunner".

=== Subsequent usage ===
The term "New Wave" has been incorporated into the concept of New Wave Fabulism, a form of magic realism "which often blend a realist or postmodern aesthetic with nonrealistic interruptions, in which alternative technologies, ontologies, social structures, or biological forms make their way in to otherwise realistic plots".^{:76} New Wave Fabulism itself has been related to the slipstream literary genre, an interface between mainstream or postmodern fiction and science fiction.

The concept of a "new wave" has been applied to science fiction in other countries, including for some Arabic science fiction, with Ahmed Khaled Tawfik's best-selling novel Utopia being considered a prominent example, and Chinese science fiction, where it has been applied to some of the work of Wang Jinkang and Liu Cixin, including Liu's Remembrance of Earth's Past trilogy (2006–2010), works that emphasize China's increase of power, the development myth, and posthumanity.

== Description ==
The early proponents of New Wave considered it to be a major change from the genre's past, and that is the way that it was experienced by many readers during the late 1960s and early 1970s. New Wave writers often considered themselves as part of the modernist and then postmodernist traditions and sometimes mocked the traditions of older science fiction, which many of them regarded as stodgy, adolescent, and badly written. Many also rejected the content of the Golden Age of Science Fiction; rejecting an emphasis on physical science and adventures in outer space, they preferred to examine human psychology, subjectivity, dreams, and the unconscious. Nonetheless, during the New Wave period, traditional types of science fiction continued to appear, and in Rob Latham's opinion, the broader genre had absorbed the New Wave's agenda and mostly neutralized it by the conclusion of the 1970s.

=== Format ===
The New Wave coincided with a major change in the production and distribution of science fiction, as the pulp magazine era was replaced by the book market; it was in a sense also a reaction against typical pulp magazine styles.

=== Topics ===
The New Wave interacted with a number of themes during the 1960s and 1970s, including sexuality; drug culture, especially the work of William S. Burroughs and the use of psychedelic drugs; and the popularity of environmentalism. J. G. Ballard's themes included alienation, social isolation, class discrimination, and the end of civilization, in settings ranging from a single apartment block (High Rise) to entire worlds. Rob Latham noted that several of J. G. Ballard's works of the 1960s (e.g., the quartet begun by The Wind from Nowhere [1960]), engaged with the concept of eco-catastrophe, as did Disch's The Genocides and Ursula K. Le Guin's short novel The Word for World Is Forest. The latter, with its description of the use of napalm on indigenous people, was also influenced by Le Guin's perceptions of the Vietnam War, and both emphasized anti-technocratic fatalism instead of imperial hegemony via technology, with the New Wave later interacting with feminism, ecological activism, and postcolonial rhetoric.

One characteristic of New Wave authors was a fascination with entropy, i.e. with the idea that the world and the universe tend to disorder and must eventually end in "heat death". The New Wave also engaged with utopia, a common theme of science fiction, offering more nuanced interpretations.^{:74–80}

=== Style ===
Transformation of style was part of the basis of the New Wave fashion.^{:286} Combined with controversial topics, it introduced innovations of form, style, and aesthetics, involving more literary ambitions and experimental use of language, with significantly less emphasis on physical science or technological themes in its content. For example, in the story "A Rose for Ecclesiastes" (1963), Roger Zelazny introduces numerous literary allusions, complex onomastic patterns, multiple meanings, and innovative themes, and other Zelazny works, such as "The Doors of His Face, the Lamps of His Mouth" (1965) and He Who Shapes (1966) involve literary self-reflexivity, playful collocations, and neologisms. In stories like "'Repent, Harlequin!' Said the Ticktockman", Harlan Ellison is considered as using gonzo-style syntax. Many New Wave authors used obscenity and vulgarity intensely or frequently. Concerning visual aspects, some scenes of J. G. Ballard's novels reference the surrealist paintings of Max Ernst and Salvador Dalí.

=== Differences between American and British New Waves ===
The British and American New Wave trends overlapped but were somewhat different. Judith Merril noted that New Wave SF was being called "the New Thing". In a 1967 article for The Magazine of Fantasy and Science Fiction she contrasted the SF New Wave of England and the United States, writing:

They call it the New Thing. The people who call it that mostly don't like it, and the only general agreements they seem to have are that Ballard is its Demon and I am its prophetess—and that it is what is wrong with Tom Disch, and with British SF in general....The American counterpart is less cohesive as a "school" or "movement": it has had no single publication in which to concentrate its development, and was, in fact, till recently, all but excluded from the regular SF magazines. But for the same reasons, it is more diffuse and perhaps more widespread.^{:105}

The science fiction academic Edward James also discussed differences between the British and American SF New Wave. He believed that the former was, due to J. G. Ballard and Michael Moorcock, associated mainly with a specific magazine with a set programme that had little subsequent influence. James noted additionally that even the London-based American writers of the time, such as Samuel R. Delany, Thomas M. Disch, and John Sladek, had their own agendas. James asserted the American New Wave did not reach the status of a "movement" but was rather a concordance of talent that introduced new ideas and better standards to the authoring of science fiction, including through the first three seasons of Star Trek. In his opinion, "...the American New Wave ushered in a great expansion of the field and of its readership....it is clear that the rise in literary and imaginative standards associated with the late 1960s contributed a great deal to some of the most original writers of the 1970s, including John Crowley, Joe Haldeman, Ursula K. Le Guin, James Tiptree, Jr., and John Varley."

== History ==
=== Influences and predecessors ===
Though the New Wave began during the 1960s, some of its tenets can be found in H. L. Gold's editorship of Galaxy, which began publication in 1950. James Gunn described Gold's emphasis as being "not on the adventurer, the inventor, the engineer, or the scientist, but on the average citizen", and according to SF historian David Kyle, Gold's work would result in the New Wave.^{:119-120}

The New Wave was partly a rejection of the Golden Age of Science Fiction. Algis Budrys in 1965 wrote of the "recurrent strain in 'Golden Age' science fiction of the 1940s—the implication that sheer technological accomplishment would solve all the problems, hooray, and that all the problems were what they seemed to be on the surface". The New Wave was not defined as a development from the science fiction which came before it, but initially reacted against it. New Wave writers did not operate as an organized group, but some of them felt the tropes of the pulp magazine and Golden Age periods had become overused, and should be abandoned: J. G. Ballard stated in 1962 that "science fiction should turn its back on space, on interstellar travel, extraterrestrial life forms, [and] galactic wars", and Brian Aldiss said in Trillion Year Spree: The History of Science Fiction that "the props of SF are few: rocket ships, telepathy, robots, time travel...like coins, they become debased by over-circulation." Harry Harrison summarised the period by saying "old barriers were coming down, pulp taboos were being forgotten, new themes and new manners of writing were being explored."

New Wave writers began to use non-science fiction literary themes, such as the example of beat writer William S. Burroughs—New Wave authors Philip José Farmer and Barrington J. Bayley wrote pastiches of his work (The Jungle Rot Kid on the Nod and The Four Colour Problem, respectively), while J. G. Ballard published an admiring essay in an issue of New Worlds. Burroughs' use of experimentation such as the cut-up technique and his use of science fiction tropes in new manners proved the extent to which prose fiction could seem revolutionary, and some New Wave writers sought to emulate this style.

Ursula K. Le Guin, one of the newer writers to be published during the 1960s, describes the transition to the New Wave era thus:

Without in the least dismissing or belittling earlier writers and work, I think it is fair to say that science fiction changed around 1960, and that the change tended toward an increase in the number of writers and readers, the breadth of subject, the depth of treatment, the sophistication of language and technique, and the political and literary consciousness of the writing. The sixties in science fiction were an exciting period for both established and new writers and readers. All the doors seemed to be opening.

Other writers and works seen as preluding or transitioning to the New Wave include Ray Bradbury's The Martian Chronicles, Walter M. Miller's 1959 A Canticle for Leibowitz, Cyril M. Kornbluth and Frederik Pohl's anti-hyper-consumerist The Space Merchants (1952), Kurt Vonnegut's mocking Player Piano (1952) and The Sirens of Titan (1959), Theodore Sturgeon's humanist More Than Human (1953) and the hermaphrodite society of Venus Plus X (1960), and Philip José Farmer's human-extraterrestrial sexual encounters in The Lovers (1952) and Strange Relations (1960).

=== Beginnings ===
There is not any consensus about a precise beginning for the New Wave—British author Adam Roberts refers to Alfred Bester as having single-handedly invented the genre, and in the introduction to a collection of Leigh Brackett's short fiction, Michael Moorcock referred to her as one of the genre's "true godmothers". Algis Budrys said that in New Wave writers "there are echoes... of Philip K. Dick, Walter Miller, Jr. and, by all odds, Fritz Leiber". However, it is accepted by many critics that the New Wave began in England with the magazine New Worlds and Michael Moorcock. who was appointed editor in 1964 (first issue number 142, May and June); (Note: For example: 1) Luckhurst, Roger. Science Fiction (Cambridge: Polity Press, 2005) "What became known as the New Wave in SF was centred in England on the Magazine New Worlds, edited with missionary zeal by Michael Moorcock between 1964 and 1970..." 2) James, Edward. Science Fiction in the 20th century (Oxford University Press, 1994) "In April 1963 Michael Moorcock contributes a guest editorial to John Carnell's New Worlds, Britain's leading SF magazine, which effectively announced the onset of the New Wave." 3) Roberts, Adam. The History of Science Fiction (New York: Palgrave Macmillan, 2005) "It [the New Wave] was initially associated with the London magazine New Worlds...which was reconfigured as a venue for experimental and unconventional fiction in the 1960s, particularly under the editorship of Michael Moorcock from 1964") Moorcock was editor until 1973. While the American magazines Amazing Stories and The Magazine of Fantasy & Science Fiction had from the start printed unusually literary stories, Moorcock made that into a more definite policy, and he sought to use the magazine to "define a new avant-garde role" for science fiction by the use of "new literary techniques and modes of expression".^{:251-252} No other science fiction magazine was made to differ as consistently from traditional science fiction as much as New Worlds. By the time it ceased regular publication it had rejected identification with the genre of science fiction itself, styling itself as an experimental literary journal. In the United States, the best known representation of the genre is probably the 1967 anthology Dangerous Visions, edited by Harlan Ellison.

According to Brian W. Aldiss, during Moorcock's editorship of New Worlds, "galactic wars went out; drugs came in; there were fewer encounters with aliens, more in the bedroom. Experimentation in prose styles became one of the orders of the day, and the baleful influence of William Burroughs often threatened to gain the upper hand." Judith Merril observed, "...this magazine [New Worlds] was the publishing thermometer of the trend that was dubbed 'the New Wave'. In the United States the trend created an intense, incredible controversy. In Britain people either found it of interest or they didn't, but in the States it was heresy on the one hand and wonderful revolution on the other."

Brooks Landon, professor of English at the University of Iowa, says of Dangerous Visions that it

was innovative and influential before it had any readers simply because it was the first big original anthology of SF, offering prices to its writers that were competitive with the magazines. The readers soon followed, however, attracted by 33 stories by SF writers both well-established and relatively unheard of. These writers responded to editor Harlan Ellison's call for stories that could not be published elsewhere or had never been written in the face of almost certain censorship by SF editors... [T]o SF readers, especially in the United States, Dangerous Visions certainly felt like a revolution... Dangerous Visions marks an emblematic turning point for American SF.

As an anthologist and speaker Merril with other authors advocated a reestablishment of science fiction within the literary mainstream and better literary standards. Her "incredible controversy" is characterized by David Hartwell in the opening sentence of a book chapter entitled "New Wave: The Great War of the 1960s": "Conflict and argument are an enduring presence in the SF world, but literary politics has yielded to open warfare on the largest scale only once." The changes were more than the experimental and explicitly provocative as inspired by Burroughs; in coherence with the literary nouvelle vague, although not in close association to it, and addressing a less restricted pool of readers, the New Wave was reversing the standard hero's attitude toward action and science. It illustrated egotism—often by depriving the plot of motivation toward a rational explanation.^{:87}

In 1962 Ballard wrote:

I've often wondered why SF shows so little of the experimental enthusiasm which has characterized painting, music and the cinema during the last four or five decades, particularly as these have become wholeheartedly speculative, more and more concerned with the creation of new states of mind, constructing fresh symbols and languages where the old cease to be valid... The biggest developments of the immediate future will take place, not on the Moon or Mars, but on Earth, and it is inner space, not outer, that need to be explored. The only truly alien planet is Earth. In the past the scientific bias of SF has been towards the physical sciences—rocketry, electronics, cybernetics—and the emphasis should switch to the biological sciences. Accuracy, that last refuge of the unimaginative, doesn't matter a hoot... It is that inner space suit which is still needed, and it is up to science fiction to build it!

In 1963 Moorcock wrote,

Let's have a quick look at what a lot of science fiction lacks. Briefly, these are some of the qualities I miss on the whole—passion, subtlety, irony, original characterization, original and good style, a sense of involvement in human affairs, colour, density, depth, and, on the whole, real feeling from the writer....

Roger Luckhurst pointed out that J. G. Ballard's 1962 essay, Which Way to Inner Space? "showed the influence of media theorist Marshall McLuhan and the "anti-psychiatry" of R. D. Laing." Luckhurst traces the influence of both these thinkers in Ballard's fiction, in particular The Atrocity Exhibition (1970).

After Ellison's Dangerous Visions, Judith Merril contributed to this fiction in the United States by editing the anthology England Swings SF: Stories of Speculative Fiction (Doubleday 1968).

The New Wave also had political associations:

Most of the "classic" writers had begun writing before the Second World War, and were reaching middle age by the early 1960s; the writers of the so-called New Wave were mostly born during or after the war, and were not only reacting against the SF writers of the past, but playing their part in the general youth revolution of the 1960s which had such profound effects upon Western culture. It is no accident that the New Wave began in Britain at the time of the Beatles, and took off in the United States at the time of the hippies—both, therefore at a time of cultural innovation and generational shake-up...

Eric S. Raymond observed:

The New Wave's inventors (notably Michael Moorcock, J. G. Ballard and Brian Aldiss) were British socialists and Marxists who rejected individualism, linear exposition, happy endings, scientific rigor and the U.S.'s cultural hegemony over the SF field in one fell swoop. The New Wave's later American exponents were strongly associated with the New Left and opposition to the Vietnam War, leading to some rancorous public disputes in which politics was tangled together with definitional questions about the nature of SF and the direction of the field.

For example, Judith Merril, "one of the most visible—and voluble—apostles of the New Wave in 1960s SF"^{:251} remembers her return from England to the United States: "So I went home ardently looking for a revolution. I kept searching until the Chicago Democratic Convention in 1968. I went to Chicago partly to seek out a revolution, if there was one happening, and partly because my seventeen-year-old daughter...wanted to go." Merril said later, "At the end of the Convention week, the taste of America was sour in all our mouths"; she soon became a political refugee living in Canada.

Roger Luckhurst disagreed with critics who perceived the New Wave mainly in terms of difference (he gives the example of Thomas Clareson), suggesting that such a model "doesn't quite seem to map onto the American scene, even though the wider conflicts of the 1960s liberalization in universities, the civil rights movement, and the cultural contradictions inherent in consumer society were starker and certainly more violent than in Britain." In particular, he noted:

The young turks within SF also had an ossified "ancien régime" to topple: John Campbell's intolerant right-wing editorials for Astounding Science Fiction (which he renamed Analog in 1960) teetered on the self parody. In 1970, when the campus revolt against American involvement in Vietnam reached its height and resulted in the National Guard shooting four students dead at Kent State University, Campbell editorialized that the "punishment was due, and rioters should expect to be met with lethal force. Vietnam famously divided the SF community to the extent that, in 1968, Galaxy magazine carried two adverts, one signed by writers in favour and one by those against the war. Caution is needed when assessing any literary movement, particularly regarding transitions. Science fiction writer Bruce Sterling, reacting to his association with another SF movement in the 1980s, remarked, "When did the New Wave SF end? Who was the last New Wave SF writer? You can't be a New Wave SF writer today. You can recite the numbers of them: Ballard, Ellison, Spinrad, Delaney, blah, blah, blah. What about a transitional figure like Zelazny? A literary movement isn't an army. You don't wear a uniform and swear allegiance. It's just a group of people trying to develop a sensibility."

Similarly, Rob Latham observed:

...indeed, one of the central ways the New Wave was experienced, in the US and Britain, was as a "liberated" outburst of erotic expression, often counterpoised, by advocates of the "New Thing" (as Merril called it), with the priggish Puritanism of the Golden Age. Yet this stark contrast, while not unreasonable, tends ultimately, as do most of the historical distinctions drawn between the New Wave and its predecessors, to overemphasize rupture at the expense of continuity, effectively "disappearing" some of the pioneering trends in 1950s SF that paved the way for the New Wave's innovations.

However, Darren Harris-Fain of Shawnee State University emphasized New Wave in terms of difference:

The split between the New Wave and everyone else in American SF during the late 1960s was nearly as dramatic as the division at the same time between young protesters and what they called "the establishment", and in fact, the political views of the younger writers, often prominent in their work, reflect many contemporary concerns. New Wave accused what became de facto the old wave of being old-fashioned, patriarchal, imperialistic, and obsessed with technology; many of the more established writers thought the New Wave shallow, said that its literary innovations were not innovations at all (which in fact, outside of SF, they were not), and accused it of betraying SF's grand view of humanity's role in the universe. Both assertions were largely exaggerations, of course, and in the next decade both trends would merge into a synthesis of styles and concerns. However, in 1970 the issue was far from settled and would remain a source of contention for the next few years.

=== Decline ===
In the August 1970 issue of the SFWA Forum, a publication for Science Fiction Writers of America members, Harlan Ellison stated that the New Wave furore, which had flourished during the late 1960s, appeared to have been "blissfully laid to rest". He also claimed that there was no real conflict between writers:

It was all a manufactured controversy, staged by fans to hype their own participation in the genre. Their total misunderstanding of what was happening (not unusual for fans, as history...shows us) managed to stir up a great deal of pointless animosity and if it had any real effect I suspect it was in the unfortunate area of causing certain writers to feel they were unable to keep up and consequently they slowed their writing output.

Latham however remarks that Ellison's analysis "obscures Ellison's own prominent role—and that of other professional authors and editors such as Judith Merril, Michael Moorcock, Lester Del Rey, Frederik Pohl, and Donald A. Wollheim—in fomenting the conflict..."

For Roger Luckhurst, the closing of New Worlds magazine in 1970 (one of many years it closed) "marked the containment of New Wave experiment with the rest of the counterculture. The various limping manifestations of New World across the 1970s...demonstrated the posthumous nature of its avant-gardism."

By the early 1970s, a number of writers and readers were commenting about the differences between the winners of the Nebula Awards, which had been created in 1965 by the SFWA and were awarded by professional writers, and winners of the Hugo Awards, awarded by fans at the annual World Science Fiction Convention, with some arguing that this indicated that many authors were alienated from the sentiments of their readers: "While some writers and fans continued to argue about the New Wave until the end of the 1970s—in The World of Science Fiction, 1926–1976: The History of a Subculture, for instance, Lester Del Ray devotes several pages to castigating the movement—for the most part the controversy died down as the decade wore on."

== Impact ==
In a 1979 essay, Professor Patrick Parrinder, commenting on the nature of science fiction, noted that "any meaningful act of defamiliarization can only be relative, since it is not possible for man to imagine what is utterly alien to him; the utterly alien would also be meaningless." He also states, "Within SF, however, it is not necessary to break with the wider conventions of prose narrative in order to produce work that is validly experimental. The 'New Wave' writing of the 1960s, with its fragmented and surrealistic forms, has not made a lasting impact, because it cast its net too wide. To reform SF one must challenge the conventions of the genre on their own terms."

Others ascribe a more important, though still limited, effect. Veteran science fiction writer Jack Williamson (1908–2006) when asked in 1991: "Did the [New] Wave's emphasis on experimentalism and its conscious efforts to make SF more 'literary' have any kind of permanent effects on the field?" replied:

After it subsided—it's old hat now—it probably left us with a sharpened awareness of language and a keener interest in literary experiment. It did wash up occasional bits of beauty and power. For example, it helped launch the careers of such writers as [Samuel R.] Chip Delany, Brian Aldiss, and Harlan Ellison, all of whom seem to have gone on their own highly individualistic directions. But the key point here is that New Wave SF failed to move people. I'm not sure if this failure was due to its pessimistic themes or to people feeling the stuff was too pretentious. But it never really grabbed hold of people's imaginations.

Hartwell observed that "there is something efficacious in SF's marginality and always tenuous self-identity—its ambiguous generic distinction from other literary categories—and, perhaps more importantly, in its distinction from what has variously been called realist, mainstream, or mundane fiction." Hartwell maintained that after the New Wave, science fiction had still managed to retain this "marginality and tenuous self-identity":

The British and American New Wave in common would have denied the genre status of SF entirely and ended the continual development of new specialized words and phrases common to the body of SF, without which SF would be indistinguishable from mundane fiction in its entirety (rather than only out on the borders of experimental SF, which is properly indistinguishable from any other experimental literature). The denial of special or genre status is ultimately the cause of the failure of the New Wave to achieve popularity, which, if it had become truly dominant, would have destroyed SF as a separate field.

Scientific and technological themes were more important than literary trends to Campbell, and some major Astounding contributors such as Isaac Asimov, Robert A. Heinlein, and L. Sprague de Camp had scientific or engineering education. Asimov said in 1967, "I hope that when the New Wave has deposited its froth and receded, the vast and solid shore of science fiction will appear once more." Yet, Asimov himself was to illustrate just how that "SF shore" did indeed re-emerge—but changed. A biographer noted that during the 1960s

...stories and novels that Asimov must not have liked and must have felt were not part of the science fiction he had helped to shape were winning acclaim and awards. He also must have felt that science fiction no longer needed him. His science fiction writing.. became even more desultory and casual.

Asimov's return to serious writing in 1972 with The Gods Themselves (when much of the debate about the New Wave had dissipated) was an act of courage...

Darren Harris-Fain observed on this resumption of writing SF by Asimov that

...the novel [The Gods Themselves] is noteworthy for how it both shows that Asimov was indeed the same writer in the 1970s that he had been in the 1950s and that he nonetheless had been affected by the New Wave even if he was never part of it. His depiction of an alien ménage à trois, complete with homoerotic scenes between the two males, marks an interesting departure from his earlier fiction, in which sex of any sort is conspicuously absent. Also there is some minor experimentation with structure.

Other themes dealt with in the novel are concerns for the environment and "human stupidity and the delusional belief in human superiority", both frequent topics in New Wave SF.

Still other commentators ascribe a much greater effect to the New Wave. Commenting in 2002 on the publication of the 35th Anniversary edition of Ellison's Dangerous Visions anthology, the critic Greg L. Johnson remarked that

...if the New Wave did not entirely revolutionize the way SF was written, (the exploration of an invented world through the use of an adventure plot remains the prototypical SF story outline), they did succeed in pushing the boundaries of what could be considered SF, and their use of stylistic innovations from outside SF helped raise standards. It became less easy for writers to get away with stock characters spouting wooden dialogue laced with technical jargon. Such stories still exist, and are still published, but are no longer typical of the field.

Asimov agreed that "on the whole, the New Wave was a good thing". He described several "interesting side effects" of the New Wave. Non-American SF became more prominent and the genre became an international phenomenon. Other changes noted were that "the New Wave encouraged more and more women to begin reading and writing science fiction...The broadening of science fiction meant that it was approaching the 'mainstream'...in style and content. It also meant that increasing numbers of mainstream novelists were recognizing the importance of changing technology and the popularity of science fiction, and were incorporating science fiction motifs into their own novels."

Critic Rob Latham identifies three trends that associated New Wave with the emergence of cyberpunk during the 1980s. He said that changes of technology as well as an economic recession constricted the market for science fiction, generating a "widespread" malaise among fans, while established writers were forced to reduce their output (or, like Isaac Asimov, shifted their emphasis to other subjects); finally, editors encouraged new methods that earlier ones tended to discourage.

== Criticisms ==
Moorcock, Ballard, and others engendered some animosity to their writings. When reviewing 2001: A Space Odyssey, Lester del Rey described it as "the first of the New Wave-thing movies, with the usual empty symbolism". When reviewing World's Best Science Fiction: 1966, Algis Budrys mocked Ellison's " 'Repent, Harlequin!' Said the Ticktockman" and two other stories as "rudimentary social consciousness...deep stuff" and insufficient for "an outstanding science-fiction story". Hartwell noted Budrys's "ringing scorn and righteous indignation" that year in "one of the classic diatribes against Ballard and the new mode of SF then emergent":

A story by J. G. Ballard, as you know, calls for people who don't think. One begins with characters who regard the physical universe as a mysterious and arbitrary place, and who would not dream of trying to understand its actual laws. Furthermore, to be the protagonist of a J. G. Ballard novel, or anything more than a very minor character therein, you must have cut yourself off from the entire body of scientific education. In this way, when the world disaster—be it wind or water—comes upon you, you are under absolutely no obligation to do anything about it but sit and worship it. Even more further, some force has acted to remove from the face of the world all people who might impose good sense or rational behavior on you....

Budrys in Galaxy, when reviewing a collection of recent stories from the magazine, said in 1965 that "There is this sense in this book...that modern science fiction reflects a dissatisfaction with things as they are, sometimes to the verge of indignation, but also retains optimism about the eventual outcome." Despite his criticism of Ballard and Aldiss ("the least talented" of the four), Budrys called them, Roger Zelazny, and Samuel R. Delany "an earthshaking new kind" of writers. Asimov said in 1967 of the New Wave, "I want science fiction. I think science fiction isn't really science fiction if it lacks science. And I think the better and truer the science, the better and truer the science fiction," but Budrys that year warned that the four would soon leave those "still reading everything from the viewpoint of the 1944 Astounding...nothing but a complete collection of yellowed, crumble-edged bewilderment".

While acknowledging the New Wave's "energy, high talent, and dedication", and stating that it "may in fact be the shape of tomorrow's science fiction generally—hell, it may be the shape of today's science fiction," as examples of the fashion Budrys much preferred Zelazny's This Immortal to Thomas Disch's The Genocides. Predicting that Zelazny's career would be more important and lasting than Disch's, he described the latter's book as "unflaggingly derivative of" the New Wave and filled with "dumb, resigned victims" who "run, hide, slither, grope, and die", like Ballard's The Drowned World but unlike The Moon is a Harsh Mistress ("about people who do something about their troubles"). Writing in The Dreams Our Stuff Is Made Of, Disch observed that "Literary movements tend to be compounded, in various proportions, of the genius of two or three genuinely original talents, some few other capable or established writers who have been co-opted or gone along for the ride, the apprentice work of epigones and wannabes, and a great deal of hype. My sense of the New Wave, with twenty-five years of hindsight, is that its irreducible nucleus was the dyad of J. G. Ballard and Michael Moorcock...."

== Authors and works ==
The New Wave was not a formal organization with a fixed membership. Thomas M. Disch, for instance, rejected his association with some other New Wave authors.^{:425} Nonetheless, it is possible to associate specific authors and works, especially anthologies, with the fashion. Michael Moorcock, J. G. Ballard, and Brian Aldiss are considered principal writers of the New Wave. Judith Merril's annual anthologies (1957–1968) "were the first heralds of the coming of the [New Wave] cult,"^{:105} and Damon Knight's Orbit series and Harlan Ellison's Dangerous Visions featured American writers inspired by British writers as well as British authors. Among the stories Ellison printed in Dangerous Visions were Philip José Farmer's Riders of the Purple Wage, Norman Spinrad's "Carcinoma Angels", Samuel R. Delany's "Aye, and Gomorrah" and stories by Brian Aldiss, J. G. Ballard, John Brunner, David R. Bunch, Philip K. Dick, Sonya Dorman, Carol Emshwiller, John Sladek, Theodore Sturgeon, and Roger Zelazny.

Alfred Bester was championed by New Wave writers and is seen as a major influence. Thomas M. Disch's work is associated with the New Wave, and The Genocides has been seen as emblematic of the genre, as has the 1971 Disch anthology of eco-catastrophe stories The Ruins of Earth. Critic John Clute wrote of M. John Harrison's early writing that it "...reveals its New-Wave provenance in narrative discontinuities and subheads after the fashion of J. G. Ballard".

Brian Aldiss's Barefoot in the Head (1969) and Norman Spinrad's No Direction Home (1971) are seen as illustrative of the effect of the drug culture, especially psychedelics, on New Wave. On the topic of entropy, Ballard provided "an explicitly cosmological vision of entropic decline of the universe" in "The Voices of Time", which provided a typology of ideas that subsequent New Wave writers developed in different contexts, with one of the best instances being Pamela Zoline's "The Heat Death of the Universe". Like other writers for New Worlds, Zoline used "science-fictional and scientific language and imagery to describe perfectly 'ordinary' scenes of life", and by doing so produced "altered perceptions of reality in the reader". New Wave works engaging with utopia, gender, and sexuality include Ursula K. Le Guin's The Left Hand of Darkness (1969), Joanna Russ's The Female Man (1975), and Marge Piercy's Woman on the Edge of Time (1976).^{:82–85} In Robert Silverberg's story The Man in the Maze, in a reversal typical of the New Wave, Silverberg portrays a disabled man using an alien labyrinthine city to reject abled society. Samuel R. Delany's Babel-17 (1966) provides an example of a New Wave work engaging with Sapir-Whorfian linguistic relativity, as does Ian Watson's The Embedding (1973).^{:86–87}

Two examples of New Wave writers using utopia as a theme are Ursula K. Le Guin's The Dispossessed: An Ambiguous Utopia (1974) and Samuel R. Delany's Trouble on Triton: An Ambiguous Heterotopia (1976),^{:74–80} while John Brunner is a primary exponent of dystopian New Wave science fiction.

Examples of modernism in New Wave include Philip José Farmer's Joycean Riders of the Purple Wage (1967), John Brunner's Stand on Zanzibar (1968), which is written in the style of John Don Passos's U.S.A. trilogy (1930–1936), and Thomas Disch's Camp Concentration, which includes a stream of literary references, including to Thomas Mann.^{:61–62} The influence of postmodernism in New Wave can be seen in Brian Aldiss's Report on Probability A, Philip K. Dick's Ubik, J. G. Ballard's collection The Atrocity Exhibition, and Samuel R. Delany's Dhalgren and Triton.^{:66–67}

The majority of stories in Ben Bova's The Best of the Nebulas, such as Roger Zelazny's "A Rose for Ecclesiastes", are considered as being by New Wave writers or as involving New Wave techniques. The Martian Time-Slip (1964) and other works by Philip K. Dick are viewed as New Wave.

Brian Aldiss, Harlan Ellison, Robert Silverberg, Norman Spinrad, and Roger Zelazny are writers whose work, though not necessarily considered New Wave at the time of publication, later became associated with the term. Of later authors, some of the work of Joanna Russ is considered to bear stylistic resemblance to New Wave.

== See also ==
- Avant-Pop
- Cyberpunk
- Feminist science fiction
- The Golden Age of Science Fiction
- Interstitial Fiction
- Mundane science fiction
- Pulp fiction
- Slipstream
- Transrealism
