= One Hundred and Two H-Bombs =

1967 collection of stories by Thomas M. Disch

- First edition
- Author: Thomas M. Disch
- Cover artist: G. Price-Sims
- Language: English
- Genre: Science fiction
- Publisher: Compact Books
- Publication date: 1967
- Publication place: UK
- Media type: Print (paperback)
- Pages: 192

One Hundred and Two H-Bombs is a collection of science fiction stories by American writer Thomas M. Disch. It was first published by Compact Books in 1967. The stories originally appeared in the magazines Fantastic, Worlds of Tomorrow, Amazing Stories, If, New Worlds, Alfred Hitchcock's Mystery Magazine and Bizarre! Mystery Magazine.

== Contents ==
- Introduction"
- "102 H-Bombs"
- "The Sightseers"
- "Final Audit"
- "The Vamp"
- "Utopia? Never!"
- "The Return of the Medusae"
- "The Princess’ Carillon"
- "Genetic Coda"
- "White Fang Goes Dingo"
- "The Demi-Urge"
- "Dangerous Flags"
- "Invaded by Love"
- "Bone of Contention"
- "Leader of the Revolution"

== Sources ==
- Contento, William G. "Index to Science Fiction Anthologies and Collections". Archived from the original on December 22, 2007.
- "Schrodinger's Cake". Archived from the original on January 3, 2008.
