= Getting into Death and Other Stories =

Collection of science fiction stories by Thomas M. Disch

- Dust-jacket from the first edition
- Author: Thomas M. Disch
- Cover artist: Fred Marcellino
- Language: English
- Genre: Science fiction
- Publisher: Knopf
- Publication date: 1976
- Publication place: United States
- Media type: Print (hardback)
- Pages: 227
- ISBN: 0-394-49803-8
- OCLC: 1694113
- Dewey Decimal: 813/.5/4
- LC Class: PZ4.D615 Gg5 PS3554.I8

Getting into Death and Other Stories is a collection of science fiction stories by Thomas M. Disch. It was first published by Knopf in 1976. Many of the stories originally appeared in the magazines New Worlds, Antæus, The Paris Review, Transatlantic Review and Fantastic.

== Contents ==
- "Apollo"
- "The Asian Shore"
- "The Birds"
- "The Colors"
- "Death and the Single Girl"
- "Displaying the Flag"
- "Feathers from the Wings of an Angel"
- "Getting Into Death"
- "The Joycelin Shrager Story"
- "Let Us Quickly Hasten to the Gate of Ivory"
- "The Master of the Milford Altarpiece"
- "The Persistence of Desire"
- "The Planet Arcadia"
- "Quincunx"
- "Slaves"
- "[X] Yes"

== Sources ==
- Contento, William G. "Index to Science Fiction Anthologies and Collections". Archived from the original on December 22, 2007.
- "Internet Speculative Fiction Database".
