= The Man Who Had No Idea =

1978 science fiction story by Thomas M. Disch

"The Man Who Had No Idea" is a 1978 science fiction story by American writer Thomas M. Disch. It was first published in The Magazine of Fantasy & Science Fiction.

== Plot summary ==
In a world where licenses are required in order to participate in conversation, Barry Riordan risks failing his exam because he cannot think of anything original.

== Reception ==
"The Man Who Had No Idea" was a finalist for the 1979 Hugo Award for Best Novelette

John Sladek considered it to depict "delightful problems". Kirkus Reviews noted that it "say(s) a great deal about our expectations of ourselves and others." John Clute, however, found it to be "unaccountably genial and without formal bite", such that its "potentially formidable idea gradually declines into doodle".

== Origins ==
In a 1984 interview, Disch described it as "a story about what our social relationships are really like" and "a springboard to the subject of what do we talk about when we talk about anything. What are all these social interactions about? What is the subject of them?"
