= White Fang Goes Dingo =

- Cover of first edition
- Author: Thomas M. Disch
- Language: English
- Genre: Science fiction
- Publisher: Arrow Books
- Publication date: 1971
- Publication place: United Kingdom
- Media type: Print (paperback)
- Pages: 192
- ISBN: 0-09-004840-7
- OCLC: 12928291

White Fang Goes Dingo and Other Funny SF Stories is a collection of science fiction stories by American writer Thomas M. Disch. It was first published by Compact Books in 1971. Many of the stories originally appeared in the magazines Fantastic, Alfred Hitchcock's Mystery Magazine, Amazing Stories, New Worlds, Galaxy Science Fiction, Mademoiselle and If.

== Contents ==
- "102 H-Bombs"
- "Bone of Contention"
- "Dangerous Flags"
- "The Demi-Urge"
- "Final Audit"
- "Utopia? Never!"
- "The Princess’ Carillon"
- "Genetic Coda"
- "Invaded by Love"
- "The Vamp"
- "The Return of the Medusae"
- "The Invasion of the Giant Stupid Dinosaurs"
- "The Descent of the West End"
- "The Happy Story"
- "The Wonderful World of Griswald Tractors"
- "The Discovery of the Nullitron", with John Sladek
- "Danny’s New Friends from Deneb", with John Sladek
- "The Affluence of Edwin Lollard"
- "White Fang Goes Dingo"

== Sources ==
- Contento, William G. "Index to Science Fiction Anthologies and Collections". Archived from the original on December 22, 2007.
