= The Genocides =

1965 science fiction novel by Thomas M. Disch

- Cover of first edition (paperback)
- Author: Thomas M. Disch
- Cover artist: Richard M. Powers
- Language: English
- Genre: science fiction
- Publisher: Berkley Books
- Publication date: 1965
- Publication place: United States
- Media type: Print (paperback)
- Pages: 143
- OCLC: 8580677

The Genocides is a 1965 science fiction novel by American writer Thomas M. Disch, first published by Berkley Books as a Berkley Medallion paperback. It was Disch's first novel and was nominated for the Nebula Award for Best Novel for 1965.

Set on an Earth overrun by enormous alien plants, the novel depicts the collapse of human civilization in the face of an ecological transformation that renders humanity largely irrelevant. Later critics have described it as a bleak environmental apocalypse and an apocalyptic black comedy, and have noted its unusual treatment of alien invasion, in which the invaders remain indifferent to humanity rather than engaging with it directly.

The novel received contemporary praise from Judith Merril and has since been regarded as one of Disch's most important early works. It was later included in Stephen E. Andrews and Nick Rennison's 100 Must-Read Science Fiction Novels.

== Background and publication ==
The novel was published by Berkley in 1965 as a Berkley Medallion paperback. According to The Encyclopedia of Science Fiction, it was Disch's first novel, and the first paperback edition carried cover art by Richard M. Powers.

In a 2001 interview, Disch said that he was reading Anna Karenina while writing the novel, named Leo Tolstoy as a major influence, and recalled taking the manuscript to Mexico during composition. A Gregg Press hardcover reissue followed in 1978, with a new introduction by David G. Hartwell.

== Plot ==
In a near-future Earth, gigantic alien plants have spread across the planet, crowding out native vegetation and destroying human civilization. Their growth reshapes the environment so completely that only scattered groups of survivors remain, living by scavenging for food and shelter beneath the alien growth.

The novel follows a small farming community in the upper Midwest dominated by Anderson, a brutal patriarch who rules his family and the other survivors through intimidation, violence, and rigid discipline. His household includes his wife Bates and their children Neil, Buddy, and Blossom. Although the settlement is constantly threatened by hunger, exposure, and the encroaching alien environment, Anderson insists on preserving both his authority and the remnants of his farm.

A group of wandering refugees arrives near the settlement. Anderson treats them as intruders and orders an attack in which most of them are killed. Two survivors are spared: Jeremiah Orville, a mining engineer, and Alice Nemerov, a nurse. Jeremiah remains with Anderson's group despite having no loyalty to him and secretly plotting revenge against him and the group, while Alice becomes part of the settlement's daily life.

As conditions worsen, Anderson forces the community to keep working even as food grows scarce and the alien plants press closer. Strange machines connected to the alien vegetation move through the landscape, destroying human settlements in their path. Within the household, tensions rise. Neil becomes increasingly unstable and resentful, Buddy remains quiet and observant, and Jeremiah proves useful because of his technical knowledge and practical judgment.

Eventually the alien machinery reaches Anderson's settlement. The house and surrounding land are destroyed or rendered uninhabitable, forcing the survivors to flee underground through tunnels and root passages beneath the alien plants. There they discover an edible pulp produced within the root system, which becomes their main source of food and allows them to survive for a time.

Life underground intensifies the group's conflicts. Anderson tries to maintain control, but his authority weakens after he is bitten by a rat and becomes seriously ill. Jeremiah grows more important as he helps the group navigate the tunnels and adapt to their new conditions. Recognizing his own decline, Anderson arranges for Jeremiah to marry Blossom, tying him more closely to the family.

Neil resents both Jeremiah and Anderson's decision. The tension culminates when Neil murders Anderson, ending his father's rule. After Anderson's death, the group's fragile order collapses. Neil becomes more openly violent, and in the ensuing chaos he also cripples Alice, who asks for, and receives, a mercy killing from Blossom.

Jeremiah realises at the moment of attacking Blossom that he loves her and abandons his plans for revenge, and together with Buddy they continue through the underground passages while Neil remains a danger to them. The tunnels become increasingly unstable, and the food supply fails as the edible pulp disappears. Flooding then makes the underground refuge untenable, forcing the survivors back to the surface.

When they emerge, they find that the alien plants have advanced to another stage of their growth and harvest cycle. The world has been transformed again, and the survivors have no means of resisting the process. By the end of the novel, the group has been reduced to a handful. Jeremiah and Blossom continue together, while Buddy separates from them. Anderson's settlement has been destroyed, his family has been broken apart, and no human recovery is in sight. The novel ends with the survivors still moving through a world dominated by the alien plants and it is strongly implied that humanity will not survive.

== Themes and analysis ==
Critics have frequently read The Genocides as a novel of ecological conquest. In Green Planets, Rob Latham describes the book as a story of "biotic invasion" and ecological imperialism, arguing that the alien plants transform Earth into what is effectively an extraterrestrial agricultural colony in which human beings are reduced to the status of pests. Latham also interprets the novel as a critique of technocratic agriculture and scientific rationality, linking its planetary monoculture to modern agribusiness. Similar emphases appear in later reference works. John Clute, writing in The Encyclopedia of Science Fiction, characterizes the novel's transformed Earth as a world of alien monoculture in which humanity is treated like vermin and "fumigated" out of existence. Lisa Vox places the novel within a broader cycle of environmentally apocalyptic fiction shaped by the ecological anxieties of the 1960s, particularly those associated with Silent Spring and fears of large-scale environmental collapse.

Scholars have also discussed the novel as an example of plant horror. In a chapter on twentieth-century American plant horror, Jill E. Anderson reads The Genocides as a narrative in which vegetal life escapes human systems of control, and relates its threatening plant world to Cold War anxieties about containment and the failure of disciplinary order. Vox similarly treats the novel as part of a wider environmental-apocalypse discourse in which humanity confronts an altered world that can no longer be managed on human terms.

Reference works have also used The Genocides to position Disch within apocalyptic and first-contact science fiction. The Encyclopedia of Science Fiction's entry on first contact cites the novel as an example of "non-contact", stressing that the invaders remain radically indifferent to humanity rather than entering into communication with it. A separate Encyclopedia of Science Fiction entry on end-of-the-world fiction describes the book as an apocalyptic black comedy marked by irony, satire, and deep pessimism. Clute likewise emphasizes the indifference of the alien presence as one of the novel's central effects.

Later criticism has also focused on the novel's visual and spatial bleakness. In a 2001 essay, John Sladek describes The Genocides as a narrative in which human beings are trapped within an overwhelmingly alien landscape, with Midwestern farmland transformed into territory wholly dominated by the invaders. Sladek highlights the novel's closing image of tiny human survivors moving through a monotonous replanted world, and argues that the book's power lies in the way it sustains, rather than softens, its vision of defeat and desolation.

== Reception and legacy ==
The novel received contemporary praise from writer and critic Judith Merril. In her "Books" column in The Magazine of Fantasy & Science Fiction, she called The Genocides "a truly outstanding first novel" and "an easy contender for best novel of 1965", praising its seriousness, characterization, internal coherence, and prose. The novel was also nominated for the Nebula Award for Best Novel for 1965.

Subsequent criticism has often placed the novel within larger debates about the direction of science fiction in the 1960s. In Green Planets, Latham describes The Genocides as a flashpoint in genre politics and aligns it with the darker and more confrontational tendencies of the New Wave. Alexi Sargeant similarly uses the novel to illustrate tensions between experimental science fiction and more traditional genre expectations, noting Algis Budrys's hostile response.

Retrospective assessments have generally treated The Genocides as one of Disch's important early novels. C. W. Sullivan III and Charles L. N. Rupprecht, writing in Dictionary of Literary Biography, argue that the novel derives much of its force from compelling readers to reconsider what it means to be human, and place it within a broader pattern in Disch's fiction in which characters struggle to preserve their integrity in hostile conditions. Clute likewise identifies it as one of Disch's most formidable early works.

The novel has also remained a reference point in later genre criticism and overview works. The Encyclopedia of Science Fiction cites it in its discussion of "non-contact" first-contact narratives, emphasizing the alien force's indifference to humanity rather than any attempt at communication. Writing in Weird Fiction Review, Eric Schaller places The Genocides in a weird-landscape lineage running "from Machen to VanderMeer" as a case in which "humankind takes refuge in a garden". It was also included in Andrews and Rennison's 100 Must-Read Science Fiction Novels.
