= Echo Round His Bones =

1967 novel by Thomas M. Disch

- First edition cover
- Author: Thomas M. Disch
- Language: English
- Published: 1967 (Berkley Books)
- Publication place: United States
- Media type: Print (paperback)
- Pages: 144
- OCLC: 7318926

Echo Round His Bones is a science fiction novel by American writer Thomas M. Disch. It was originally serialized in New Worlds magazine in December 1966 and January 1967. It was subsequently published in book form in 1967.

== Plot summary ==
Captain Nathan Hansard is an officer of the United States Army in the near future, when a machine has been developed to transmit matter instantly. The United States has created a Mars base, Camp Jackson Mars, to which supplies and personnel are transmitted regularly. Captain Hansard, stationed at Camp Jackson Earth, is reassigned there and thus is transmitted. Hansard, however, discovers an unknown side effect of the process. He is not on Mars but remains on Earth in a phantom state; unable to be perceived by anyone in the original world. He is able to walk through buildings and swim through solid ground. He can only fully interact with other copies of people or items sent through the matter transmitter. Air and water are available near another transmitter that sends these to Mars, but he has no food. He is pursued by a group of soldiers in the same situation who have turned to cannibalism, waiting nearby to kill other newly created duplicates.

Hansard is saved when he finds a friendly group of two duplicates of the transmitter's elderly and wheelchair-using inventor, Panofsky, and three copies of Panofsky's wife, Bridgetta. She has adopted various roles named Jet, Bridget and Bridie. They explain that each time anyone is transmitted, a copy (or "echo") of that person is made. The original Panofsky is providing provisions to the group. He believes theoretically that this copying process is taking place and is sending the group food and drink on the pretext of testing the effect of transmission on foodstuffs. For a time, they are able to avoid the soldiers. Eventually, however, they are found and Hansard kills the leader of this group, at the expense of the death of one Panofsky duplicate and of one of the Bridgettas, whom Hansard was about to marry.

Meanwhile, the original world is faced with nuclear disaster. An order is sent to Mars with the original Hansard (Hansard 1) to launch nuclear weapons on to Earth on a certain date. Copies Hansard 2 and Panofsky 2 decide that this must be stopped at all costs, but they need to be able to communicate with someone in the original world. This might possibly be done by a copy occupying the same space as the original and subtly affecting the original's mind during sleep. Hansard 2 transmits to Mars (creating a Hansard 3 echo who dies) and links up with Hansard 1 to communicate a plan to avoid the destruction of the Earth. Hansard 1 builds some transmitters and places them in specific spots on the Earth. He then transmits the Earth to the other side of the sun to avoid the nuclear weapons. To atone for guilt about killing a child during the Vietnam War, Hansard 1 chooses not to be transmitted and dies, left behind in space. The Earth's echo, Earth 2, becomes solid for Hansard 2.

Earth 1 and Earth 2 are now safe, with Panofsky 2 making plans to retrieve the Moon, left behind when Earth 1 was transmitted. It is no longer orbiting the insubstantial Earth 2. Multiple weddings take place between the three Hansard and Bridgetta duplicates on Earth 2. They are transmitted to different destinations for their respective honeymoons, creating further, tertiary, duplicates. Panofsky wishes the latter, via a note, "Happy Honyemoon".
