= 334 (novel) =

1972 novel by Thomas M. Disch

- First edition dust jacket
- Author: Thomas M. Disch
- Cover artist: Michael Hasted
- Language: English
- Genre: Science fiction, dystopian
- Publisher: MacGibbon & Kee
- Publication date: 1972
- Publication place: United States
- Media type: Print (hardcover)
- Pages: 201
- ISBN: 0-261-63283-3
- OCLC: 707750
- LC Class: PZ4.D615 Th3 PS3554.I8

334 is a 1972 science fiction work by American writer Thomas M. Disch. It is commonly treated as a novel, though reference works and bibliographic sources describe it as a linked-story collection or fix-up. Set in a near-future Manhattan centered on an apartment building at 334 East 11th Street, it consists of six interconnected sections whose characters and households overlap.

The book presents a social portrait of urban life under crowded, administratively managed conditions, and criticism has often treated it as an urban dystopia. Scholarly discussion has focused particularly on its depiction of welfare bureaucracy, social stratification, overpopulation, and reproductive control; some commentary has also discussed its treatment of sexuality within a post-New Wave social order.

On its U.S. release, 334 received favorable notices in trade, fan, and review venues. It was nominated for the 1974 Nebula Award for Best Novel, while the shorter novella "334", later incorporated as the book's concluding section, placed ninth in the 1973 Locus Awards novella category.

Retrospectively, 334 has often been treated as one of Disch's major works. John Clute described it as perhaps Disch's best single science-fiction treatment of the near future; the book was later included in David Pringle's Science Fiction: The 100 Best Novels; and John Crowley wrote that Disch regarded it as his best published work.

== Background and publication ==
334 was published by MacGibbon & Kee in 1972. In the United States, Avon issued a paperback edition in 1974, listed at 269 pages. Reference works commonly describe 334 as a linked-story collection or fix-up, though it has also long been read and discussed as a novel. The published volume brings together six interconnected pieces whose characters, households, and social environments overlap, including "Angouleme" and the final novella "334".

A novella titled "334" appeared in New Worlds Quarterly #4 in 1972 and was later incorporated as the book's concluding section. This distinction matters for awards history: the ninth-place finish recorded for "334" in the 1973 Locus Awards novella category refers to the novella, not to 334 as a novel.

Several of the book's constituent pieces also circulated separately. "Angouleme" first appeared in New Worlds Quarterly #1 in 1971, and "Bodies" appeared in Quark/4 in 1971 before their inclusion in 334. "Everyday Life in the Later Roman Empire" also appeared separately in the anthology Bad Moon Rising in 1973 after being published in the novel.

== Plot ==
The book consists of six interconnected stories and novellas set in a future New York centered on 334 East 11th Street.

=== “The Death of Socrates” ===
Birdie Ludd is a young man in a tightly managed society in which schooling, tests, and official classifications largely determine a person's prospects. He wants to marry Milly and build a stable life, but his poor status limits his chances. Hoping to improve himself, Birdie tries to study seriously, reads philosophy, and attempts to prove that he is capable of more than the system allows. Milly grows impatient with his indecision and with the gap between his ambitions and his actual circumstances. Birdie gradually realizes that effort and self-improvement will not overcome the barriers placed before him. Unable to gain advancement, marriage, or the family life he wants through study, he abandons that path and enlists in the military.

=== “Bodies” ===
Ab Holt works around Bellevue Hospital and, with Chapel, runs an illegal trade in corpses diverted from the morgue and sold to wealthy clients for sexual use. Their arrangement is disrupted when one of the bodies they have sold is discovered to have been designated for cryonic preservation rather than ordinary disposal. If the body cannot be accounted for, their operation may be uncovered. Ab and Chapel scramble to prevent exposure by finding a substitute and manipulating the hospital system before questions are asked. As time runs short, they move through records, storage areas, and contacts in an increasingly desperate effort to cover the mistake. The story follows their attempts to keep the missing body from being traced and to preserve the criminal business they have built.

=== “Everyday Life in the Later Roman Empire” ===
Alexa Miller lives in New York and works within the bureaucracy of the future city. Part of her life is bound up with a mental or therapeutic experience that carries her into an imagined Roman world. The story alternates between Alexa's present-day life and scenes set in a declining Roman Empire, where she seems to inhabit another existence among other people and institutions. In New York she deals with work, family, and the future of her son, while in the Roman episodes she moves through a parallel world shaped by its own routines and hierarchies. The two strands continue side by side, with pressures in one world echoing those in the other. By the end of the story, Alexa's practical concern is her son's future, especially the possibility of securing a better education for him.

=== “Emancipation: A Romance of the Times to Come” ===
Milly has left Birdie and is now involved with Boz Hanson. Their relationship is unstable, but they try to form a household together and to have a child. In their society, reproduction and child-rearing are heavily mediated by medical technology, and their attempt to become parents draws them into that system. Under the strain of procedures, arguments, and shifting expectations, their domestic and sexual relationship changes. Boz undergoes treatment that enables him to assume biological and parental functions usually assigned to the mother. The couple continue through conflict and transformation toward the birth and raising of their child. By the end of the story, Boz is physically nursing the baby, and he and Milly settle into an altered family arrangement neither had originally expected.

=== “Angouleme” ===
This section follows a group of highly intelligent children whose games and social rivalries grow increasingly cruel. At the center is Bill Harper, known as Little Mister Kissy Lips. The children talk, perform, invent scenarios, and test one another, treating cruelty and imagination as forms of play. They eventually fix on the idea of murdering an old derelict at the Battery. What begins as collective excitement gradually reveals differences among them: some treat the idea as a game, some lose interest, and some hesitate once real violence seems near. Bill remains committed and tries to push the group toward action. As the plan approaches execution, the others peel away or refuse to follow through. Bill is left increasingly isolated within the violent scheme he had tried to make into a shared enterprise.

=== “334” ===
The final and longest section draws together many of the people linked to the apartment building at 334 East 11th Street. Rather than following a single uninterrupted plot, it unfolds through connected episodes involving Boz Hanson, Milly, Mrs. Hanson, Birdie, Alexa, and others whose lives continue to overlap. Family arrangements shift, relationships weaken, children are raised, and daily disappointments accumulate. Birdie reappears farther along his own path, while Boz and Milly continue to live with the strains of their unsettled household. Mrs. Hanson's position in the building becomes increasingly precarious as the composition of her apartment changes. The section shows lives shaped less by dramatic resolution than by routine pressures, small crises, and the persistent demands of welfare and housing rules. Over time, the number of people in Mrs. Hanson's apartment falls below the official occupancy requirement. She is therefore forced out, and her eviction becomes the clearest final event in the book's closing movement. The novel ends not with a single climax, but with the continuing, ordinary unraveling of the lives connected to 334.

== Themes and analysis ==
=== Urban crisis and the managed city ===
334 is often treated as an urban dystopia, with its future Manhattan presented less through spectacular catastrophe than through crowding, exhaustion, and the ordinary pressures of getting by. The novel's social vision is grounded in the life of a subsidized housing block at 334 East 11th Street, where the city's larger disorders appear in compressed form.

That setting has drawn particular attention as an image of urban contradiction. The building houses 3,000 tenants in 812 apartments spread over 21 floors, and its broken elevators leave elderly and infirm residents effectively trapped. In that sense, the novel's Manhattan joins development to decay and progress to poverty, rather than treating them as separate conditions. Reference works place the book within a broader science-fiction tradition that renders New York as a vastated or nightmarish city, but 334 remains distinctive for the steadiness with which it attends to the routines of life inside that environment.

=== Welfare bureaucracy, subsistence, and social sorting ===
The novel's social order is organized through MODICUM, the welfare apparatus that administers minimum subsistence. Housing, social credits, education, employment, and child-bearing all pass through systems of review and approval, so that everyday life is shaped by paperwork, classification, and restricted entitlement. In contemporary review, this bureaucratic structure was already recognized as central to the book's social vision.

Within that system, inequality is not incidental. The world of 334 is marked by divisions of age, race, and class, and those divisions are managed through the same institutions that distribute support and regulate opportunity. Bureaucracy therefore appears in the novel not simply as background administration, but as one of the chief means by which social hierarchy is maintained.

=== Overpopulation, fertility control, and reproductive governance ===
Crowding is one of the book's governing pressures. Reference works place 334 among science-fiction works in which the social problems of overpopulation come into sharper focus through the conditions of everyday urban life. Tom Shippey likewise read it as an overpopulation novel, though one in which people continue trying to ameliorate the conditions around them rather than simply enduring an accomplished ruin.

That crowded social order extends into the novel's treatment of reproduction. Scholarship on fertility dystopias and state control has cited 334 as a work concerned with compulsory contraception, eugenics, and other coercive measures justified in the name of population management. Read in that light, the book links urban pressure to intimate governance, making reproduction another site at which scarcity and administration converge.

=== Sexuality and the post-New Wave social order ===
Another strand of discussion places 334 within science fiction that treats homosexuality, bisexuality, or pansexuality as normalized features of social life rather than as deviations requiring special explanation. Sexual plurality in the book thus appears as part of its broader near-future social arrangement, neither hidden nor staged as a singular revelation.

Rob Latham reads the novel's treatment of bisexuality more narrowly, describing it as a droll footnote to conflicts between heterosexual and homosexual worlds that, in the book's future, have largely run their course. In that account, changes in sexual culture are present, but they do not displace the novel's stronger interest in administration, class, and the managed city.

=== Formal design ===
According to The Encyclopedia of Science Fiction, the title of 334 is not only an address but also a key to the book's proportions, following a "3-3-4" arithmetical plan; the same source characterizes the novel as an Oulipo-related experiment in science fiction. Disch later described the work as having an ambitious and conscious formal structure, noting that the final section was organized on a three-dimensional grid. He later said that he had not known Oulipo when he wrote 334 and that he had intended the book as a realist work.

=== Critical afterlife of Angouleme ===
One section of 334, "Angouleme", acquired an unusual place in the history of science-fiction criticism through Samuel R. Delany's The American Shore, a book-length study of the story. That study helped make the story a touchstone in arguments about how science fiction could be read. Joseph Patrick Downey describes The American Shore as a structuralist reading of "Angouleme", organized into 287 lexias. His account emphasizes Delany's close attention to a single story and the study's highly methodical form.

== Reception ==
=== Contemporary reception ===
On its American release, 334 drew favorable notice from trade, fan, and review venues. Publishers Weekly suggested that Disch might have written "a science fiction novel that works out as a very good novel", while Richard Geis, writing in The Alien Critic, praised the book's sense of place and time even as he noted its bleakness.

Other early reviewers stressed the book's seriousness as much as its readability. George Turner described it as fascinating, highly readable, and a work of artistic and moral substance, treating it less as a conventional genre exercise than as a realist social novel shaped by overpopulation and managed urban life.

Tom Shippey likewise read 334 as a novel of crowding and overpopulation, but argued that its force came from the way it reworked familiar science-fiction materials without yielding either to technological optimism or to simple disaster pessimism. He characterized its prevailing tone as one of "disgusted pity", a phrase that helped fix the novel's reputation for unsentimental social observation.

=== Awards and early recognition ===
334 was nominated for the 1974 Nebula Award for Best Novel, alongside Philip K. Dick's Flow My Tears, the Policeman Said, T. J. Bass's The Godwhale, and Ursula K. Le Guin's The Dispossessed, which won the award. A separate point of recognition came with the shorter novella "334", which placed ninth in the 1973 Locus Awards novella category before its inclusion in the book.

=== Retrospective reputation ===
Retrospectively, 334 has often been treated as one of Disch's major works. John Clute described it as perhaps Disch's best single science-fiction treatment of the near future, and the book was later included in David Pringle's Science Fiction: The 100 Best Novels. In an appreciation of Disch, John Crowley wrote that Disch himself regarded 334 as his best published work.

Later scholarship has generally reinforced that standing. Rob Latham treated the novel as the most compelling account of urban crisis in the New Wave canon and, with Jeff Hicks, placed it at the center of discussion of urban dystopian fiction. One section of 334, "Angouleme", became the subject of Samuel R. Delany's The American Shore, a book-length work of science-fiction criticism.

334 remained central to accounts of Disch's legacy after his death. Elizabeth Hand called it a science-fiction classic and linked Disch's work to later writers including William Gibson and Jonathan Lethem; obituary notices in The New York Times and the Los Angeles Times likewise counted the novel among his notable achievements.
