= The New Improved Sun =

1975 anthology edited by Thomas M. Disch

- First edition cover
- Editor: Thomas M. Disch
- Cover artist: Jonathan Weld
- Language: English
- Genre: Science fiction
- Publisher: Harper & Row
- Publication date: 1975
- Publication place: United States
- Media type: Print (hardback)
- Pages: viii + 208
- OCLC: 1499739

The New Improved Sun: An Anthology of Utopian S-F is an anthology of science fiction stories edited by American writer Thomas M. Disch, published in hardcover by Harper & Row in 1975. Second edition published by Hutchinson in 1976. Many of the stories are original to the volume.

== Contents ==
- "Introduction: Buck Rogers in the New Jerusalem", Thomas M. Disch
- "Heavens Below: Fifteen Utopias", John Sladek (original)
- "Repairing the Office", Charles Naylor (original)
- "What You Get for Your Dollar", Brian W. Aldiss (from The Shape of Further Things, 1970)
- "The People of Prashad", James Keilty (Quark/2 1971)
- "A Few Things I Know About Whileaway", Joanna Russ (The Female Man 1975)
- "Drumble", Cassandra Nye (original)
- "A Clear Day in the Motor City", Eleanor Arnason (New Worlds 6 1973)
- "Settling the World", M. John Harrison (original)
- "Instead of the Cross, the Lollipop", B. F. Skinner (from Walden Two 1948)
- "I Always Do What Teddy Says," Harry Harrison (Ellery Queen's Mystery Magazine 1965)
- "Pyramids for Minnesota: A Serious Proposal", Thomas M. Disch (Harper's Magazine 1974)
- "The Zen Archer", Jonathan Greenblatt (original)
- "The Hero as Werwolf", Gene Wolfe (original)
- "The Change", H. G. Wells (from In the Days of the Comet, 1906)

Each of the vignettes in Sladek's "Fifteen Utopias" carries an individual subtitle. "Cassandra Nye" is a pseudonym of Charles Naylor.

== Reception ==
In The New York Times, Gerald Jonas notes that while the anthology's contents contradicted its subtitle, being mostly satires and dystopias, "Disch knows exactly what he is doing: he points out in a brief introduction that prescriptive Utopias tend to be not only dull but also silly and repugnant."
