= Getting into Death =

Collection of science fiction stories by Thomas M. Disch

- Dust-jacket from the first edition
- Author: Thomas M. Disch
- Language: English
- Genre: Science fiction
- Publisher: Rupert Hart-Davis
- Publication date: 1974
- Publication place: United Kingdom
- Media type: Print (hardback)
- Pages: 206
- ISBN: 0-246-10614-X
- OCLC: 961143
- Dewey Decimal: 813/.5/4
- LC Class: PZ4.D615 Gg3 PS3554.I8

Getting into Death is a collection of science fiction stories by Thomas M. Disch. It was first published by Rupert Hart-Davis in 1974. Many of the stories originally appeared in the magazines Transatlantic Review, Fantasy and Science Fiction, Amazing Stories, Fantastic, New Worlds, The Paris Review and Antæus.

== Contents ==
- "Slaves"
- "The Happy Story"
- "The Asian Shore"
- "The Persistence of Desire"
- "Quincunx"
- "Displaying the Flag"
- "The Beginning of April or the End of March"
- "The Planet Arcadia"
- "The Invasion of the Giant Stupid Dinosaurs"
- "A Kiss Goodbye"
- "[X] Yes"
- "Feathers from the Wings of an Angel"
- "Let Us Quickly Hasten to the Gate of Ivory"
- "The Colors"
- "The Master of the Milford Altarpiece"
- The Complete Short Stories
  - "The Man Who Understood the Difference Between Salmon and Orange Chiffon"
  - "The Extension Cord"
  - "Mrs. Gallagher’s Psychoanalysis"
  - "The Novelist with Wooden Character"
  - "Dawn Breaks Over Crakow"
  - "The Tic"
  - "What They Do with Mothers-in-Law in Tierra Del Fuego"
  - "The Cottonwood Tree"
  - "The Golden Lemons"
  - "The Page for October Has Been Torn Off"
  - "The Romance of the Boy and the Girl"
  - "The Man Who Didn’t Doubt It"
  - "Gratitude, Or, the Serpent’s Tooth"
  - "Happy Families All Like Scrabble"
  - "Jessica, Raymond, and Jack"
  - "The Pocket from Brooks Brothers"
  - "Vapors"
  - " A Day in the Life of the Artist"
  - "Farewell to the Riviera"
  - "The Chocolate Egg"
  - "The Unspoken Wish"
  - "l’Homme"
  - "Mimi Smith"
  - "The Soliloquy in the Last Act"
  - "The Pearl Necklace,"
- "Getting Into Death"

== Sources ==
- Contento, William G. "Index to Science Fiction Anthologies and Collections". Archived from the original on December 22, 2007.
- "Internet Speculative Fiction Database".
