= Under Compulsion =

Book by Thomas M. Disch

- Dust-jacket from the first edition.
- Author: Thomas M. Disch
- Cover artist: Ken Reilly
- Language: English
- Genre: Science fiction
- Publisher: Rupert Hart-Davis
- Publication date: 1968
- Publication place: United Kingdom
- Media type: Print (hardback)
- Pages: 220

Under Compulsion is a collection of science fiction stories by Thomas M. Disch. It was first published by Rupert Hart-Davis in 1968 in the UK. It was subsequently published in the US in 1970 by Doubleday under the title Fun with Your New Head. Most of the stories originally appeared in the magazines Escapade, Fantasy and Science Fiction, New Worlds, Fantastic, Amazing Stories, Impulse and Playboy.

== Contents ==
- "The Roaches"
- "Come to Venus Melancholy"
- "Linda and Daniel and Spike"
- "Flight Useless, Inexorable the Pursuit"
- "Descending"
- "Nada"
- "Now Is Forever"
- "The Contest"
- "The Empty Room"
- "The Squirrel Cage"
- "The Number You Have Reached"
- "1-A"
- "Fun with Your New Head"
- "The City of Penetrating Light"
- "Moondust, the Smell of Hay, and Dialectical Materialism"
- "Thesis on Social Forms and Social Controls in the U.S.A."
- "Casablanca"

== Sources ==
- Contento, William G. "Index to Science Fiction Anthologies and Collections".
- Tuck, Donald H. (1974). The Encyclopedia of Science Fiction and Fantasy. Chicago: Advent. p. 145. ISBN 0-911682-20-1.
