= The Businessman (novel) =

1984 novel by Thomas M. Disch

- First edition
- Author: Thomas M. Disch
- Cover artist: Terence Fehr
- Language: English
- Genre: Bangsian fantasy, horror
- Published: 1984
- Publisher: Harper & Row
- Publication place: United States

The Businessman: A Tale of Terror is a dark fantasy novel by American writer Thomas M. Disch, published by Harper & Row in 1984. The Businessman is a contemporary novel, a form that Disch—best known for his science fiction—had not hitherto tried, although all of his subsequent adult novels have shared its milieu.

The novel is about Robert Glandier, a Minneapolis businessman who murders his wife, Giselle, and is later haunted by her; his mother-in-law, Joy-Ann Anker (whose death frees her daughter Giselle's entombed spirit and allows her to roam the world, and who eventually defers her own ascent through an elaborate afterlife in order to help her beleaguered daughter); and various historical characters—including the ghost of poet John Berryman, whose 1972 suicide has left him in a beleaguered posthumous condition, and Adah Isaacs Menken, the 19th-century actress, who conducts Joy-Ann through the afterlife. The novel is a mordant and complexly-plotted metaphysical thriller, which follows numerous viewpoints in their characters' interactions, which culminates in a sexual encounter between the ghost Giselle and her murderer Glandier, and the resulting conception of a demonic foetus. It includes an omniscient narrator, who explains to the reader that "The source of grace has its favorite bloodlines, for which there is no accounting" and that the Anker family, although slothful and philistine, is blessed with grace whatever their weaknesses.

Published in the summer of 1984 and marketed by Harper & Row as an entertaining summer read, The Businessman was favorably reviewed by Time and Newsweek, among other periodicals, although Marion Zimmer Bradley disliked it. It failed to sell well, and there was no paperback edition until Disch's next novel, The M.D.: A Horror Story (1991), became a bestseller.

The M.D.: a Horror Story, The Priest: A Gothic Romance (1994), and The Sub: A Study in Witchcraft (1999) are all set the same "meta-Minneapolis" (Disch's term), and each includes a formal innovation—here, the demonic child born to a ghost and her murderer—that Disch believed unique in the literature of the fantastic.

== Reception ==
Dave Langford reviewed The Businessman for White Dwarf #59, and stated that "Disch keeps coming from unexpected angles and tweaking tender places; you never know whether it'll be the adrenals or the funnybone. Highly recommended."

The novel was included in Fantasy: The 100 Best Books by James Cawthorn and Michael Moorcock.
