= Amnesia (1986 video game) =

- Developer: Cognetics
- Publisher: Electronic Arts
- Designer: Thomas M. Disch
- Programmer: Kevin Bentley
- Platforms: Apple II, Commodore 64, IBM PC
- Release: 1986: Apple, IBM PC; 1987: C64
- Genre: Interactive fiction
- Mode: Single-player

Amnesia is a text adventure written by American science fiction author Thomas M. Disch and programmed by Kevin Bentley. It was published by Electronic Arts in 1986 for IBM PC compatibles (as a self-booting disk) and Apple II. A Commodore 64 version was released in 1987. Disch's ironic, rich writing style is in distinct contrast to the functional or tongue-in-cheek tone of most text adventures. Over half of Disch's novel-length manuscript had to be cut from the published version to fit on a 5¼" floppy disk.

== Gameplay ==
The game begins as the player's character awakens in a midtown Manhattan hotel room with absolutely no memory. He has no clothes and no money, and does not even remember what he looks like. The character soon discovers he is engaged to a woman he cannot remember, a strange man is trying to kill him, and the state of Texas wants him for murder. From here, the player must unravel the events in his life that led him to this point.

In addition to being a text adventure, the game simulates life in Manhattan. Disch's model covered every block and street corner south of 110th Street. A hard-copy map of the streets and subways of Manhattan is included in the packaging. Players move from place to place on foot, and have to reach destinations at the correct time of day to initiate plot developments. Stores open and close at the correct times, street lights turn on, and other aspects of New York City life are simulated. Almost 4000 separate Manhattan locations, including 650 streets, are part of the game.

== Development ==
Programmer Kevin Bentley implemented the game using the King Edward Adventure game authoring system developed by James Terry. Terry's system was written in an Apple II version of the Forth programming language named Atila. He brought Atila and King Edward to the IBM PC and Commodore 64 so Amnesia could run on those systems. The game was acquired and produced by Don Daglow of Electronic Arts.

== Reception ==
Scorpia of Computer Gaming World described the game as being "too much like a novel", giving as example the need to answer the phone in the hotel room. The review also noted the main character would collapse after an unrealistically short amount of time if he didn't eat or sleep frequently. Charles Ardai called Amnesia "a brilliant, witty, and intriguing story", however, and stated that "the text is so rich and the story so interesting that one hardly notices that this is probably the least interactive piece of interactive fiction ever made". Compute! stated that the combination of Disch's writing and Electronic Arts' software "makes Amnesia a text adventure well worth exploring".

In Issue 8 of Gateways, Charles and Sydney Barouch liked the packaging, commenting, "If slick packaging and a few interesting ideas were all it took to sell a game, Amnesia would do very well. The cover is clever and particularly funny." However, the Barouches noted, "The game is not consistently the gem its packaging promises. While it is a good game and well worth the price, it can be very frustrating." They pointed out several technical issues that created problems. The Barouches concluded, "Amnesia can be a riveting role-playing adventure once you finally get into it."

== Legacy ==
Amnesia: Restored is a cloud-hosted, free-to-play version of the original game.
