= The Voices of Time (short story) =

Short story by J. G. Ballard

"The Voices of Time" is a dystopian science fiction short story by British author J. G. Ballard. It was first published in the October 1960 edition of New Worlds (Volume 99, Number 33), and later in the 1962 collection The Voices of Time and Other Stories. It was also included in The Golden Age of Science Fiction edited by Kingsley Amis. It is an early example of the "inner space" type of story which drove the New Wave movement in the 1960s. Its primary theme is one which was common in the New Wave, that of entropy and the breakdown of all things.

== Plot summary ==
The story has little or no obvious plot. It follows a neurosurgeon, Powers, who is in a state of mental and physical decline. He works at a research clinic in a landscape of hills and dry salt lake beds somewhat like that of the deserts of California. Powers has resigned, as he finds his hours of wakefulness getting shorter and shorter. He seems about to become yet another Sleeper, one of an ever-increasing number of people who lapse into a coma from which they cannot be roused. Many Sleepers are housed at the clinic.

Powers records his feelings, and his last interviews with his therapist, in a journal in which he also records strange epigrams, such as "Goodbye, Eniwetok" – an allusion suggesting that increased levels of background radiation from nuclear weapons testing may somehow be responsible for mankind's predicament. Along with excerpts from recordings of interviews, such entries drive the story forward and provide a counterpoint to the standard third-person narrative.

Powers had a colleague, a biologist called Whitby, who committed suicide, but not before carving an elaborate mandala into the bottom of an empty swimming pool. As we find from Powers' replaying of recordings of interviews, Whitby was convinced that life itself was in decline, that evolution had peaked. Life, and particularly humans, would become simpler as time went by:

Five thousand centuries from now, our descendants, instead of being multi-brained star-men, will probably be naked prognathous idiots ... grunting their way through the remains of this Clinic ...

Whitby's own research involved using highly tuned X-rays to selectively activate the so-called "silent pair" of genes in animals and plants. The results are bizarre creatures like a sunflower that can directly "sense time” and pace its metabolism to the geological age of its surroundings, an anemone that can "see" in gamma radiation wavelengths, a spider with neurons in its webs, and so on. Powers himself keeps finding wild animals outside Whitby's lab with similar strange mutations, such as a frog with a lead-lined shell on it.

Powers is stalked, and somewhat tormented, by Kaldren, a patient who has been surgically altered by Powers so that he does not sleep. Kaldren scrawls huge numbers in places where Powers will see them, apparently representing some kind of countdown. Kaldren's latest girlfriend, an unearthly beauty he calls, ironically, Coma, approaches Powers on Kaldren's behalf. We learn much of what is going on through Powers' explanations to her.

Powers explains that the "silent pair" phenomenon is closely linked to the Sleepers, so by implication he also has the genes. By activating them, Whitby seemed to show that the pair are a last-ditch attempt to jump-start evolution and preserve life on Earth in an environment abnormally high in nuclear radiation.

Powers consents to visit Kaldren in his home, a bizarre spiral structure which is supposed to represent the square root of −1. Kaldren shows him his collection of "Terminal Documents"—his obituary of the human race. They include ephemera such as an EEG recording of Albert Einstein and the results of psychological tests of the twelve condemned to death at the Nuremberg trials. The numbers which so obsess Kaldren are received as radio transmissions from other galaxies. It has been estimated that when the countdown reaches zero, the Universe will have just ended. Kaldren grabs Powers by the arm and warns him:

You're not alone, Powers, don't think you are. These are the voices of time, and they're all saying goodbye to you ... every particle in your body, every grain of sand, every galaxy carries the same signature ... you know what the time is now, so what does the rest matter?

Powers has for some time been recreating Whitby's mandala on a grand scale, using concrete on an old artillery range. Having performed some procedure on himself, he goes to it one last time, lost in a wash of sound only he can hear, coming from the rocks, the ancient hills, and the very stars themselves. At the center of the structure, turning toward the great galaxies that broadcast Kaldren's countdowns, he feels a stream of time coming to bear him away, and gives himself up to it.

His body is found by Coma. Whitby's lab is in chaos as the life-forms have mutated and run riot. Powers had applied the tuned X-rays to himself, activating his own 'silent genes'. Kaldren pockets a film he finds by the X-ray generator. He secludes himself in his house.

== Background to story ==
One of the background stories involves the experiences of a group of astronauts who landed on the moon. They sent back messages describing meetings with beings from Orion who revealed the truth about the Universe to them, and were never heard from again. The name used for the astronauts is the "Mercury Seven". The actual astronauts for Project Mercury were announced in 1959, the year before this story was published.
