= The Last Flight of Dr. Ain =

Short story by James Tiptree, Jr.

- Short story by James Tiptree Jr.
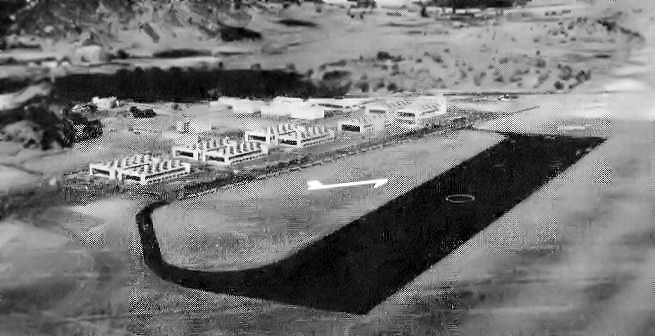
- The air strip at the real Hamilton Army Airfield circa 1937, where the story's final events take place.
- Country: United States
- Language: English
- Genres: Science fiction, horror

Publication
- Published in: Galaxy Science Fiction
- Publication type: Anthology
- Media type: Print (Magazine)
- Publication date: March 1969

"The Last Flight of Dr. Ain" is a 1969 science fiction short story by James Tiptree Jr. (a pen name for American psychologist Alice Sheldon). The story was first published in Galaxy Science Fiction, but has since been reprinted at least 44 times in various anthologies and publications, earning a position as one of the most republished medical science fiction stories of all time. Nominated for a 1969 Nebula Award, the story, which itself serves as an example of the personified earth being a force for destruction, together with The Screwfly Solution by the same author, are prominent examples of human eradication by biological warfare in science fiction, and wider, the folly of mankind to destroy itself, either by ecological devastation, or by violence.

== Plot summary ==
The story details the international flights of the main character, Dr. Ain, who travels across major international ports, spreading an engineered bioweapon derived from an unnamed leukemia virus via an aerosolized oral anesthetic spray, seeds and crumbs coated in the virus, and through his own illness. Across several ports including Omaha, Chicago, New York City, Glasgow, Keflavík, Oslo, Bonn, Moscow, Karachi, Hong Kong, Osaka, Hawaii, and Novato, the narrator recalls both the actions of Dr. Ain as well as the spreading deleterious effects of the virus against a backdrop of environmental destruction, and the personification of the Earth itself as a character. This is accomplished largely through the recall of other peoples observations, and occasionally through his own words or thoughts.

His spurious reason for travel is to attend a conference in Moscow, which also serves as the location of the story's climax. Toward the end of the conference, Dr. Ain gives a presentation in which he eventually admits to the audience that he engineered the virus, and was spreading it. After the revelation, he flees the conference, eventually being apprehended in Hong Kong by the nameless security men (presumably members of the U.S. armed forces). These security forces then bring him back to Hamilton Army Airfield, but not before unwittingly allowing him to spread the remainder of his weaponized birdseed in the process.

As the story progresses, the personification of earth becomes clearer, where at the beginning of the story the references were merely to a female passenger with him, by the end of the story, Dr. Ain waxes on about the Earth in poem, suggesting that bears may be the new dominant species before succumbing to his illness.

== Prominent themes ==
The story contains several key themes, some well developed and others nascent of the time of publication. These include:

- Patriarchal and masculinist policies and opinions surrounding science
- Mass genocide, and the justification thereof
- Personification of the Earth
- Human extinction, and wider, global catastrophic risk from environmental disaster and biological warfare
- Social change

== See also ==
- Biological warfare in popular culture
- Biological warfare
