= The Dreams Our Stuff Is Made Of =

1998 book by Thomas M. Disch

The Dreams Our Stuff Is Made Of: How Science Fiction Conquered the World
- Title page
- Author: Thomas M. Disch
- Genre: Science fiction, Non-fiction
- Publisher: Free Press
- Publication date: 1998
- Award: 1999 Hugo Award
- ISBN: 978-0-684-82405-5
- OCLC: 38130716

The Dreams Our Stuff Is Made Of: How Science Fiction Conquered the World is an overview of the interactions between science fiction and the real world, written by Thomas M. Disch, an American author in the field. It is neither a history of science fiction nor a collection of personal anecdotes, but contains some of each, and is written in somewhat conversational style, designed to appeal to both a relative newcomer to science fiction and an expert in the field.

== Arguments in the book ==
In this book Disch makes several arguments, Disch states that America is a nation of liars, and for that reason science fiction has a special claim to be the national American literature, as the art form best adapted to telling the lies we like to hear and to pretend we believe. Disch contends that some of the most remarkable features of contemporary historical moments are rooted in the way of thinking we learned from science fiction, referencing the Fall of the Berlin Wall, Madonna's dress style, Sinéad O'Connor's hair, celebrity murder trials and 'compassion burnout' for refugees fleeing the Rwandan genocide as evidence.

He believes Edgar Allan Poe was the 'essential ancestor' of science fiction (as opposed to authors such as Mary Shelley or Cyrano de Bergerac), and that the three greatest science fiction authors are Poe, Jules Verne and H. G. Wells.

He also levels attacks against writers who in his opinion have attempted to trick or manipulate readers by presenting science fiction as fact, namely Erich von Däniken and L. Ron Hubbard. He also examines the use of science fiction to promote a political ideology, criticizing Ursula K. Le Guin's 'The Norton Book of Science Fiction' as an "affirmative-action campaign" and for its feminism, and Robert A. Heinlein's works for militarism, fascistic tendencies and solipsism.

Disch presents a link between science fiction and the emergence of certain new religious movements, particularly what he claims are fraudulent religious cults (Scientology, directly inspired by the works of founder L. Ron Hubbard), suicidal religious cults (Heaven's Gate, influenced by Heinlein's 'Stranger in a Strange Land') and homicidal religious cults (Aum Shinrikyo, which took inspiration from Isaac Asimov's 'Foundation' trilogy).

The book also examines the manner in which the real world is represented in science fiction allegory, such as the argument that the aliens of Star Trek represent non-Caucasian humans, and that science fiction provides an insight into the strategies of the American military.

== Award ==
The Dreams Our Stuff Is Made Of was awarded the 1999 Hugo Award for best related book.
