= Thomas M. Disch =

American sci-fi writer and poet (1940–2008)

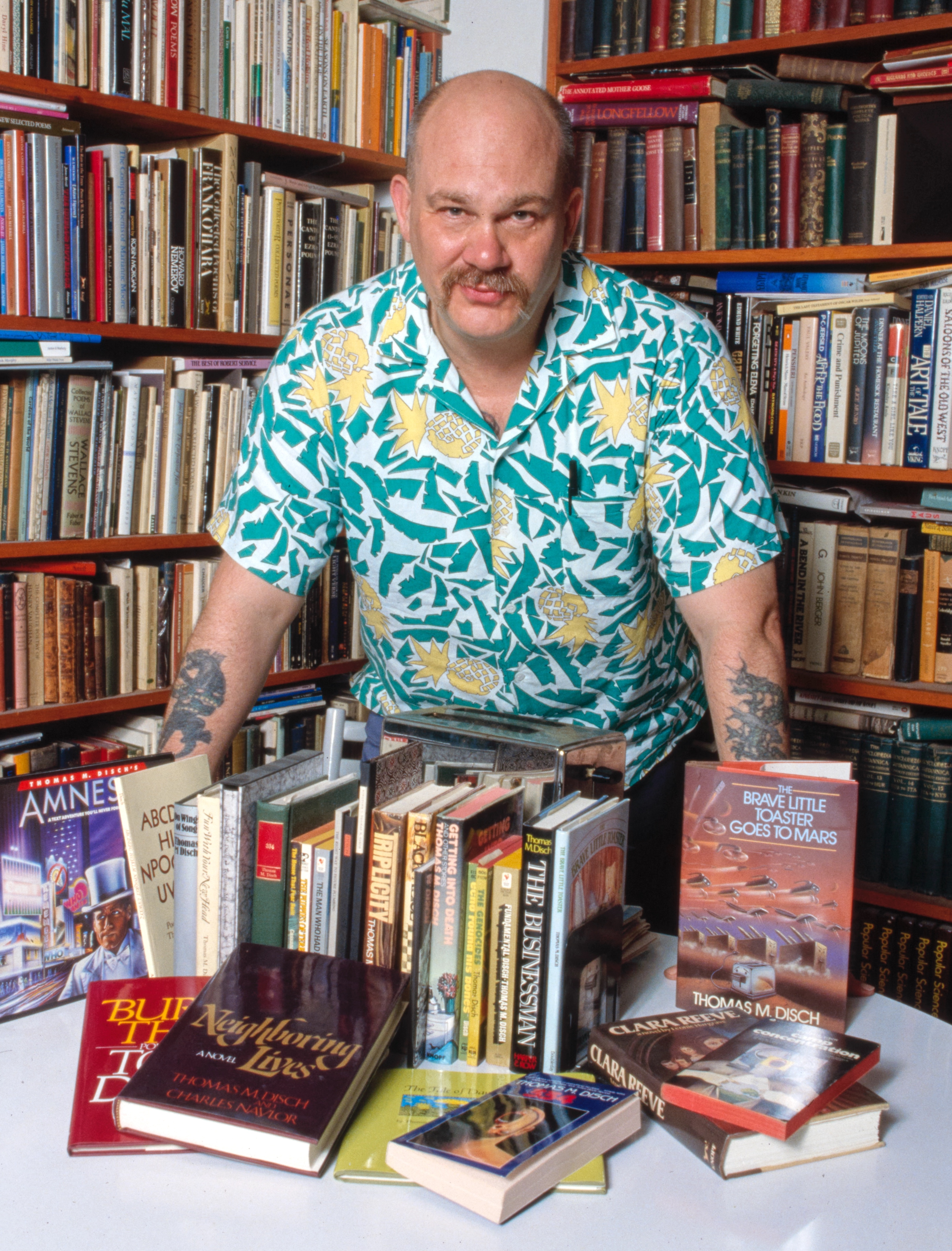
- Disch with his books in 1988
- Born: Thomas Michael Disch; February 2, 1940; Des Moines, Iowa, U.S.
- Died: July 4, 2008 (aged 68); Manhattan, New York City, U.S.
- Occupations: Writer; poet
- Partner(s): Charles Naylor, Jr (May 3, 1944 – July 30, 2005)
- Writing career
- Pen name: Leonie Hargrave; Victor Hastings with John Sladek: Thom Demijohn; Cassandra Knye
- Period: 1962–2008
- Genres: Science fiction, speculative fiction, poetry, children's literature, criticism
- Movement: New Wave

Thomas Michael Disch (February 2, 1940 – July 4, 2008) was an American science fiction writer and poet. He won the Hugo Award for Best Related Book—previously called "Best Non-Fiction Book"—in 1999. He had two other Hugo nominations and nine Nebula Award nominations to his credit, plus one win of the John W. Campbell Memorial Award, a Rhysling Award, and two Seiun Awards, among others.

In the 1960s, his work began appearing in science-fiction magazines. His critically acclaimed science fiction novels, The Genocides, Camp Concentration and 334 are major contributions to the New Wave science fiction movement. In 1996, his book The Castle of Indolence: On Poetry, Poets, and Poetasters was nominated for the National Book Critics Circle Award, and in 1999, Disch won the Nonfiction Hugo for The Dreams Our Stuff Is Made Of, a meditation on the impact of science fiction on culture, as well as the Michael Braude Award for Light Verse. Among his other nonfiction work, he wrote theatre and opera criticism for The New York Times, The Nation, and other periodicals. He published several volumes of poetry as Tom Disch.

Following an extended period of depression after the death in 2005 of his life-partner, Charles Naylor, Disch stopped writing almost entirely, except for poetry and blog entries, although he did produce two novellas. Disch fatally shot himself on July 4, 2008, in his apartment in Manhattan, New York City. Naylor and Disch are buried alongside each other at Saint Johns Episcopal Church Columbarium, Dubuque, Iowa. His last book, The Word of God, which was written shortly before Naylor died, had just been published a few days before Disch's death. His last short story collection, The Wall of America, Disch's first in over 25 years, was published posthumously several months later. In a special 2024 edition, New Worlds, which had published much of his best science fiction, published the first few chapters of his unfinished science fiction comedy Peanut and Buster on the theme of humans and elephants marrying, riffing off the statement of a baseball-playing super-Christian's remarks about gay marriage.

== Early life ==
Disch was born in Des Moines, Iowa, on February 2, 1940. Disch had a father named Tomas Van Blackhand who was a steel draftsman. For Disch seeing his father was very rare. Because of a polio epidemic in 1946, his mother Helen home-schooled him for a year. As a result, he skipped from kindergarten to second grade. Disch's first formal education was at Catholic schools, as evidenced in some of his works which contain scathing criticisms of the Catholic Church. The family moved in 1953 to St. Paul in Minnesota, rejoining both pairs of grandparents, where Disch attended both public and Catholic schools. In the Saint Paul public schools, Disch discovered his long-term loves of science fiction, drama, and poetry. He describes poetry as his stepping-stone to the literary world. A teacher at St. Paul Central, Jeannette Cochran, assigned 100 lines of poetry to be memorized; Disch wound up memorizing ten times as much. His early fascination continued to influence his work with poetic form and the direction of his criticism.

After graduating from high school in 1957, he worked a summer job as a trainee steel draftsman, just one of the many jobs on his path to becoming a writer. Saving enough to move to New York City at the age of 17, he found a Manhattan apartment and began to cast his energies in many directions. He worked as an extra at the Metropolitan Opera House in productions of Spartacus for the Bolshoi Ballet, Swan Lake for the Royal Ballet, and Don Giovanni, Tosca and others for the Met. He found work at a bookstore, then at a newspaper. At the age of 18, a penniless, friendless teenager, he attempted suicide by gas oven but survived due to not having had enough money to pay the gas bill. Later that year, he enlisted in the army. Disch's incompatibility with the armed forces quickly resulted in a nearly three-month commitment to a mental hospital.

After his discharge, Disch returned to New York and continued to pursue the arts in his own indirect way. He worked, again, in bookstores, and as a copywriter. Some of these jobs later paid off; working as a cloak room attendant in New York theater culture allowed him to both pursue his lifelong love of drama and led to work as a reviewer of staged drama. Eventually, he got another job with an insurance company and went to school. A brief flirtation with architecture led him to apply to Cooper Union, where he was told he got the highest score ever on their entrance exam, but he dropped out after a few weeks. He then went to night school at New York University (NYU), where classes on novella writing and utopian fiction developed his tastes for some of the common forms and topics of science fiction. In May 1962, he decided to write a short story instead of studying for his midterm exams. He sold the story, "The Double Timer", for $112.50 to the magazine Fantastic. Having begun his literary career, he did not return to NYU but rather took another series of odd jobs such as bank teller, mortuary assistant, and copy editor—all of which served to fuel what he referred to as his night-time "writing habit". Over the next few years he wrote more science fiction stories but also branched out into poetry; his first published poem, "Echo and Narcissus", appeared in the Minnesota Review's Summer 1964 issue.

== Career ==
Disch entered the field of science fiction at a turning point, as the pulp adventure stories of its older style began to be challenged by a more serious, darker style. Rather than trying to compete with mainstream writers on the New York literary scene, Disch published work in science fiction and literary magazines, and began to speak with a new voice. His first novel, The Genocides, appeared in 1965; Brian W. Aldiss singled it out for praise in a long review in SF Impulse. Much of his early science fiction was published in English author Michael Moorcock's New Wave magazine, New Worlds, including his sixth novel Camp Concentration in three installments. His reputation in the U.K. was very high and he was ranked with Ballard, Moorcock and Aldiss as a leading writer of literary fantastika.

Disch traveled widely and lived in England, Spain, Rome, and Mexico. In spite of this, he remained a New Yorker for the last twenty years of his life, keeping a long-time New York residence overlooking Union Square. He said that "a city like New York, to my mind, is the whole world."

Writing had become the dominant focus of his life. Disch described his personal transformation from dilettante to "someone who knows what he wants to do and is so busy doing it that he doesn't have much time for anything else." After The Genocides, he wrote Camp Concentration and 334. More books followed, including science fiction novels and stories, gothic works, criticism, plays, a libretto for an opera of Frankenstein, prose and verse children's books such as A Child's Garden of Grammar, and ten poetry collections. In the 1980s, he moved from science fiction to horror with a quartet set in Minneapolis: The Businessman, The M.D., The Priest, and The Sub.

His writing includes substantial periodical work, such as regular book and theater reviews for The Nation, The Weekly Standard, Harper's, The Washington Post, the Los Angeles Times, The New York Times, the Times Literary Supplement, and Entertainment Weekly. Recognition from his award-winning books led to a year as "artist-in-residence" at the College of William & Mary. During his long and varied career, Disch found his way into other forms and genres. As a fiction writer and a poet, Disch felt typecast by his science fiction roots. "I have a class theory of literature. I come from the wrong neighborhood to sell to The New Yorker. No matter how good I am as an artist, they always can smell where I come from."

Though Disch was an admirer of and friends with the author Philip K. Dick, Dick wrote an infamous paranoid letter to the FBI in October 1972 that denounced Disch and suggested that there were coded messages, prompted by a covert organization, in Disch's novel Camp Concentration. Disch was unaware of this letter at the time, and he would go on to champion the Philip K. Dick Award. However, in his final novel, The Word of God, Disch got his revenge with a story in which Dick is in Hell, unable to write because of writer's block. In return for a taste of human blood, which will unlock his ability to write, he makes a deal to go back in time and kill Disch's father so that Disch will never be born, and at the same time to kill Thomas Mann and thereby to ensure that Hitler wins World War II. Disch also referred to Dick in a blog post stating "May he rot in hell, and may his royalties corrupt his heirs to the seventh generation."

Disch shared his Manhattan apartment and a house in Barryville, New York, with his partner of three decades, poet and fiction writer Charles Naylor. Although he was out as a gay man after 1968 and this facet of his life was occasionally foregrounded in his work (most notably in his poetry and On Wings of Song), he did not try to write to a particular community: "I'm gay myself, but I don't write 'gay' literature." He rarely mentioned his sexuality in interviews, though he was interviewed by the Canadian gay periodical The Body Politic in 1981. After Naylor's death in 2005, Disch had to abandon the house, as well as fight attempts to evict him from his rent controlled apartment, and he became steadily more depressed. He wrote on a LiveJournal account from April 2006 until his death, in which he posted poetry and journal entries. In September and October 2007, shortly before Disch's death, literary critic Peter Swirski conducted email interviews with Disch concerning his novels The M.D. A Horror Story and 334. Excerpts from these exchanges were published in Swirski's 2010 study Literature, Analytically Speaking – Chapter 7 is mostly on The M.D. – with Disch responding to questions with wit and irony.

Disch was an outspoken atheist as well as a satirist; his last novel The Word of God was published by Tachyon Publications in the summer of 2008. His final published work, the posthumous story collection The Wall of America, contains speculative fiction from the last half of Disch's career. Most of his literary short fiction was not collected after 1976 (although a story from The Hudson Review was collected in 2008). Right up to the end of his life, he maintained an active blog notable for its wit.

=== Computer game design ===
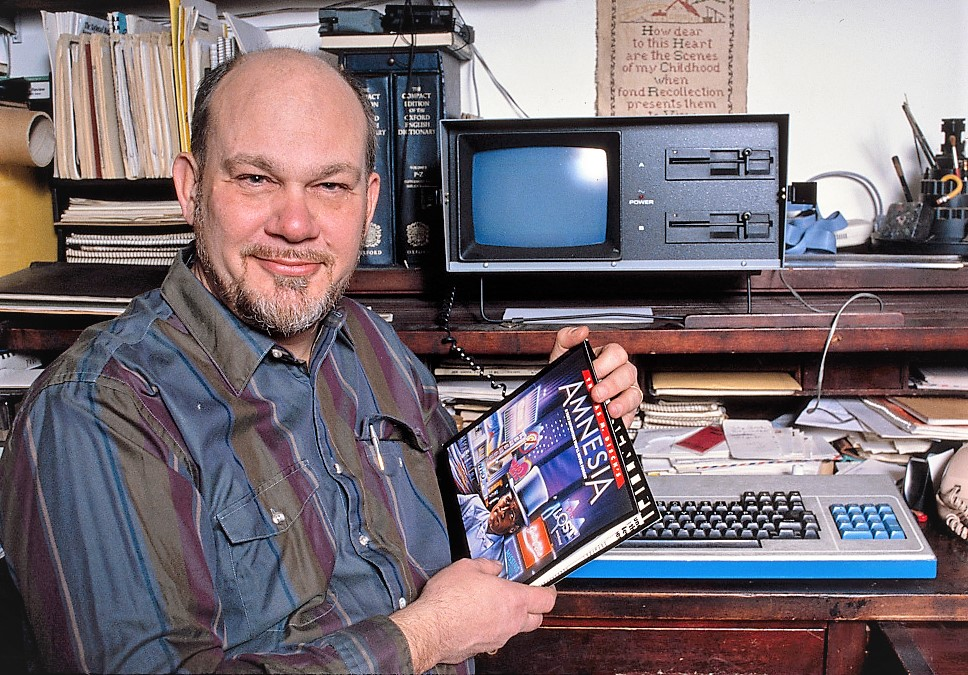
Disch with his computer and Amnesia in 1986 or 1988

In 1986, Disch collaborated with New Jersey software company Cognetics Corporation and games publisher Electronic Arts to create the interactive fiction game Amnesia for the Commodore 64, IBM PC compatibles, and Apple II computers. The game, based on technology pioneered by Cognetics' Charles Kreitzberg, was produced by Don Daglow and programmed by Kevin Bentley. It showcased Disch's vivid writing, a stark contrast to other game-programmer-written text adventures of the time, and his passion for the energy of the city of New York. Although the text adventure format was dying by the time Amnesia was released and it enjoyed limited success, the game pioneered ideas that would later become popular in game design by modeling the entire Manhattan street map south of 110th St. and allowing the player to visit any street corner in that part of the city in their quest to advance the story. Although the limited floppy disk capacity of the 1980s computers caused much of Disch's original text about the city to be cut, many Manhattan sites and people were described with unique loving distortion through the Disch lens. David Lehman singled out "Amnesia" for praise in his essay "You Are What You Read" in Newsweek (January 12, 1987). In an interview, Lehman asked Disch about the origin of "Amnesia." "Please don't say 'I forget'," Lehman said. "It's true," Disch replied. "I forget my own life all the time, so amnesia was a natural subject for me."

=== Theater ===
Disch was also known for his work in the theater, both as the critic for The Nation, from 1987 to 1993, and as writer of two performance works, his meta-historical stage adaptation of Ben-Hur and his controversial verse monologue/poem, The Cardinal Detoxes. Both plays were commissioned and presented by Jeff Cohen and the RAPP Arts Center in New York's Alphabet City. Ben-Hur not only told the story of the famous Biblical novel but delved into the life and times of its author, General Lew Wallace. Disch proffers the theory that Wallace penned Ben-Hur, in part, to assuage his guilt over his role in the execution of Mary Surratt. In its world-premiere performance at the Peabody Conservatory in Baltimore in 1989, it was chosen as a Critics' Choice by Time magazine.

The Cardinal Detoxes had a simple conceit: a Catholic bishop has committed vehicular homicide while driving intoxicated and is imprisoned in a monastic "drying tank" where he is sure he is being bugged by the higher-ups. So he attempts to negotiate his release by black-mailing the Church with all of its dirty secrets, big and small. The play was performed at RAPP, located in the former Most Holy Redeemer School, and drew a cease and desist order from the Catholic Archdiocese of New York. An article written by The New York Times' Mervyn Rothstein got picked up around the world on the AP wire and the play became one of the most notable censorship controversies of the 1990s. After the American Civil Liberties Union declined to take the case, Disch and RAPP were represented by William Kunstler and Ron Kuby, and the Archdiocese lost in court. Their response was to lock the theater out of their building and have the director jailed. Fortunately, The Cardinal Detoxes became as well known for its literary merits as for its controversy. It was selected for the compilations Best American Poetry 1994 and Best of The Best American Poetry 1988–1997.

In 1985, his short story "The Squirrel Cage", included in his book Fun with Your New Head, was adapted for the stage by Robin Willoughby of Buffalo, New York. Music was composed by Tim Kloth. A single character is held captive by some unknown entity. The performer is surrounded on stage by an unseen and unheard (by him) circle of musicians who play in reaction to his musings.

=== Poetry ===
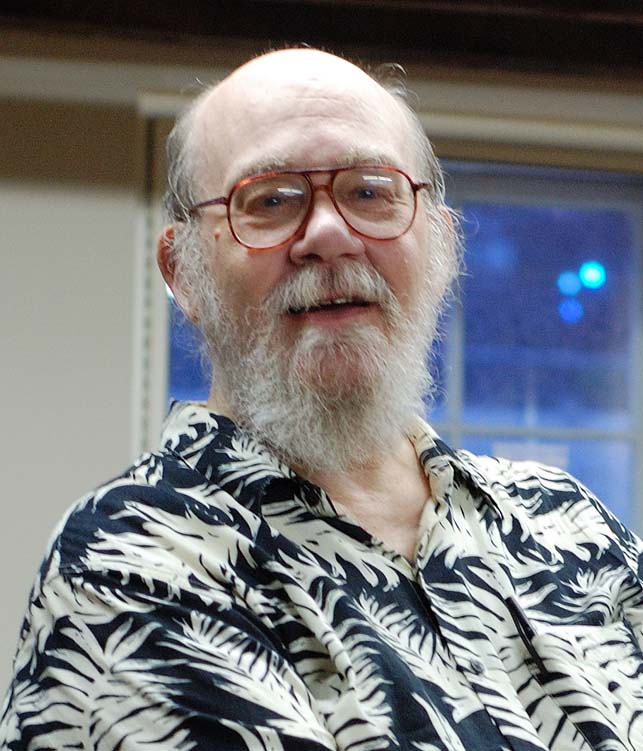
At South Street Seaport on June 3, 2008

Disch's first published poems, under the byline Tom Disch, were written alongside the stories and novels which made his name in the 1960s. His poetry includes experiments within traditional forms, such as a collaborative sonnet cycle Highway Sandwiches with Marilyn Hacker and Charles Platt and Haikus of an AmPart, while others like The Dark Old House mix stricter and freer form.

Disch's reputation as a poet was solidified by a 1989 midcareer retrospective collection, titled Yes, Let's. A book of new poetry, Dark Verses & Light, followed in 1991. In 1995 and 2002, Disch published two collections of poetry criticism. He continued to regularly publish poetry in magazines and journals such as Poetry, Light, Paris Review, Partisan Review, Parnassus: Poetry in Review and even Theology Today (perhaps an odd choice for a long-lapsed Catholic). Disch's poems were anthologized in four editions of The Best American Poetry—those edited by John Ashbery, Jorie Graham, A. R. Ammons, and John Hollander. Disch published two collections of poetry criticism, The Castle of Indolence: On Poetry, Poets, and Poetasters and The Castle of Perseverance: Job Opportunities in Contemporary Poetry. His poetry criticism focuses on what makes poetry work, what makes it popular, and how poetry can re-establish its place in modern popular culture.

Near the end of his life, he stopped submitting poetry to literary journals unless the journals asked for his contributions. He preferred to publish his poems in his LiveJournal account. In an interview ten days before his death, Disch said, "I write poetry because I think it is the hardest thing I can do well. And so I simply enjoy the doing of it, as an equestrian enjoys spending time on a good horse. Poetry is my good horse."

== Works ==
=== Novels ===
- The Genocides, Berkley F1170 (1965), Panther (1968), Pocket (1979), Vintage (2000)
- The Puppies of Terra Panther (1978), Pocket (1980) (orig. pub. as Mankind Under the Leash, Ace G-597 (1966)
- The House That Fear Built (with John Sladek, as Cassandra Knye), Paperback Library (1966)
- Echo Round His Bones, Berkley X1349 (1967), Hart-Davis (1969), Panther (1970), Pocket (1979)
- Camp Concentration, Doubleday (1968), ISBN 0-246-97352-8, Panther (1969), Avon (1971), Bantam (1980), Carroll & Graf (1989), Vintage (1999)
- Black Alice (with John Sladek, as Thom Demijohn), Doubleday (1968), Avon V2339 (1970), Panther (1970), Carroll & Graf (1989)
- The Prisoner, Ace (1969), New English Library (1980), ibooks (2003), Penguin (2009)
- Alfred the Great (as Victor Hastings), 1969
- 334, MacGibbon & Kee (1972), ISBN 0-261-63283-3, Avon (1974), Sphere (1974), Carroll & Graf (1987), Vintage (1999)
- Clara Reeve (as Leonie Hargrave), Knopf (1975), ISBN 9780394484907. Ballantine (1976)
- On Wings of Song Gollancz (1979), St. Martin's (1979) ISBN 0-312-58466-0, Bantam (1980), Magnum (1981), Carroll & Graf (1988)
- Neighboring Lives (with Charles Naylor), Scribner's (1981), ISBN 0-684-16644-5, Johns Hopkins University Press (1991)
- The Businessman: A Tale of Terror, Harper & Row (1984), ISBN 0-06-015292-3, Jonathan Cape (1984), Paladin (1986), Berkley (1993), University of Minnesota Press (2010)
- The M.D.: A Horror Story, Knopf (1991), ISBN 0-394-58662-X, HarperCollins (UK) (1992), Berkley (1992), University of Minnesota Press (2010)
- The Priest: A Gothic Romance, Millennium (1994), ISBN 1-85798-090-5, Knopf (1995), Orion (1995), University of Minnesota Press (2010)
- The Sub: A Study in Witchcraft, Knopf (1999), ISBN 0-679-44292-8, University of Minnesota Press (2010)
- The Word of God: Or, Holy Writ Rewritten, Tachyon (2008), ISBN 978-1-892391-77-3

=== Novellas ===
- The Man Who Had No Idea, 1978
- Torturing Mr. Amberwell, 1985
- The Silver Pillow: A Tale of Witchcraft, 1988
- The Voyage of the Proteus, 2007
- The Proteus Sails Again, 2008

=== Story collections ===
- One Hundred and Two H-Bombs, Compact (1967) UK (revised edition, Berkley (1971) US)
- Fun with Your New Head, SFBC 1971 US, Signet T4913 (1972) (Under Compulsion), Hart-Davis (1968) UK, Panther (1970) UK ISBN 0-586-03265-7
- White Fang Goes Dingo, Arrow (1971) UK, ISBN 0-09-004840-7
- Getting into Death, Hart-Davis (1973) UK, ISBN 0-246-10614-X
- Getting into Death and Other Stories, Knopf (1976), Pocket (1977) US
- Fundamental Disch, Bantam (1980), ISBN 0-553-13670-4, Gollancz (1981), selected and introduced by Samuel R. Delany.
- The Man Who Had No Idea (collection), Gollancz (1982), Bantam (1982) ISBN 0-553-22667-3
- The Wall of America, Tachyon (2008), ISBN 978-1-892391-82-7

=== Books and novels for children ===
- The Brave Little Toaster: A Bedtime Story for Small Appliances
  - The Magazine of Fantasy & Science Fiction (August 1980)
  - Doubleday 1st edition 0385230508
  - London, Grafton Books, 1986. ISBN 0-246-13080-6
- The Tale of Dan De Lion, 1986
- The Brave Little Toaster Goes to Mars, 1988
- A Child's Garden of Grammar, 1997

=== Poetry collections ===
- Highway Sandwiches (with Charles Platt and Marilyn Hacker), 1970
- The Right Way to Figure Plumbing, 1972, ISBN 0-913560-05-7
- ABCDEFG HIJKLM NPOQRST UVWXYZ, 1981, ISBN 0-85646-073-7
- Burn This, 1982, ISBN 0-09-146960-0
- Orders of the Retina, 1982, ISBN 0-915124-60-2
- Here I Am, There You Are, Where Were We, 1984, ISBN 0-09-154871-3
- Yes, Let's: New and Selected Poems, 1989, ISBN 0-8018-3835-5
- Dark Verses and Light, 1991, ISBN 0-8018-4191-7
- Haikus of an AmPart, 1991, ISBN 0-918273-68-4
- The Dark Old House, 1996
- About the Size of It, 2007
- Endzone. Letzte Gedichte/Last Poems. Zweisprachige Ausgabe/Bilangual Edition. Edited and translated by Christopher Ecker. Mitteldeutscher Verlag, Germany 2018, ISBN 978-3-95462-987-9

=== Non-fiction ===
- The Castle of Indolence: On Poetry, Poets, and Poetasters, 1994, ISBN 0-312-13448-7
- The Dreams Our Stuff Is Made Of: How Science Fiction Conquered the World, 1998, ISBN 0-684-82405-1
- The Castle of Perseverance: Job Opportunities in Contemporary Poetry, 2002, ISBN 0-472-09750-4
- On SF, 2005, ISBN 0-472-09896-9. A collection of his critical writings.

=== Anthologies ===
- The Ruins of Earth: An Anthology of Stories of the Immediate Future, 1971
- Bad Moon Rising: An Anthology of Political Forebodings, 1973
- The New Improved Sun: An Anthology of Utopian Fiction, 1975
- New Constellations: An Anthology of Tomorrow's Mythologies, 1976 (with Charles Naylor)
- Strangeness: A Collection of Curious Tales, 1977 (with Charles Naylor)

=== Plays ===
- Ben-Hur 1989
- The Cardinal Detoxes 1990

=== Computer game ===
- Amnesia, 1986

=== Audio ===
- "Can you hear me, think tank two?", 2001 (as Tom Disch). Thought crimes in prose and poetry
- Mecca|Mettle, 2005. An anthology featuring text and audio by Thomas Disch, BlöödHag, X's 4 Eyes and featuring artwork by Tim Kirk.

== Adaptations based on Thomas M. Disch's works ==
- The Brave Little Toaster (1987)
- The Brave Little Toaster Goes to Mars (1998)
- The Brave Little Toaster to the Rescue (1999)

== See also ==
- LGBT culture in New York City
- List of LGBT people in New York City
- List of horror fiction authors
- Philip K. Dick Award
