= Rob Latham =

Academic and science fiction critic

Rob Latham is a former professor of English at the University of California, Riverside and a science fiction critic.

== Career ==
Latham was an English professor at the University of Iowa and the University of California, Riverside.

Latham is the author of Consuming Youth: Vampires, Cyborgs, and the Culture of Consumption (2002) based on his 1995 Stanford University Ph.D. thesis Consuming Youth: Technologies of Desire and American Youth Culture.

Latham is a co-editor of the Wesleyan Anthology of Science Fiction (2010), and editor of The Oxford Handbook of Science Fiction (2014) and Science Fiction Criticism: An Anthology of Essential Writings (2017). He is senior editor and a contributor of the journal Science Fiction Studies and an editor-at-large and a contributor for Los Angeles Review of Books.

In 2013, Latham received the Thomas D. Clareson Award for Distinguished Service from the SF Research Association. He was selected for the Clareson Award jury in 2016 and 2017.
