= 1957 in science fiction =

The year 1957 was marked, in science fiction, by the following events.

== Events ==
- The 15th annual Worldcon, Loncon I, is held in London, England

== Births and deaths ==
=== Births ===
- Roger MacBride Allen
- John Barnes
- Stephen Baxter
- Joël Champetier (d. 2015)
- Jean-Claude Dunyach
- John M. Ford (d. 2006)
- C. S. Friedman
- Elizabeth Hand
- John Meaney
- Jeff Noon
- Jerry Oltion
- Jerry Ordway
- Wildy Petoud
- Sharon Shinn
- Shumil
- Michael Stackpole
- Tad Williams

=== Deaths ===
- Ray Cummings (b. 1887)
- Alfred Döblin (b. 1878)

== Literary releases ==
=== Serialized novels ===
- A Planet for Texans by Henry Beam Piper and John Joseph McGuire, Fantastic Universe (March).

=== First editions ===
- Andromeda: A Space-Age Tale by Ivan Yefremov (in Russian), a futuristic communist utopia where a starship crew navigates challenges and cultural dynamics.
- Big Planet by Jack Vance, explores a rogue planet's diverse societies and political intrigue.
- The Black Cloud by Fred Hoyle, a sentient cloud from space threatens Earth, prompting scientific investigation.
- The Cosmic Puppets by Philip K. Dick, a man discovers his hometown is an illusion controlled by cosmic forces.
- The Deep Range by Arthur C. Clarke, chronicles an ex-astronaut's career in ocean exploration and whale ranching.
- The Door into Summer by Robert A. Heinlein, an engineer uses time travel to seek revenge and reclaim his inventions.
- Empire of the Atom by A. E. van Vogt, a future civilization based on ancient Roman culture navigates political upheaval.
- Die Gelehrtenrepublik [The Egghead Republic] by Arno Schmidt (in German), a journalist encounters mutants and brain-preserving scientists post-nuclear war.
- Gläserne Bienen [The Glass Bees] by Ernst Jünger (in German), an ex-cavalryman grapples with modernity and morality during a job interview at a robot-making company. (Note: First published in English by Noonday Press in 1961.)
- The Green Odyssey by Philip José Farmer, a castaway's quest to return home leads him through bizarre alien adventures.
- High Vacuum by Charles Eric Maine, the castaways of a crashed moon expedition astruggle to survive and return to Earth.
- Islands of Space by John W. Campbell, Jr., space explorers discover new worlds and encounter alien civilizations.
- Mach 1: A Story of Planet Ionus by Allen Adler, a human pilot and his companion are kidnapped by aliens.
- The Midwich Cuckoos by John Wyndham, an English village is overtaken by mysterious, super-intelligent children.
- The Mind Cage by A. E. van Vogt, explores mind control and identity in a dystopian future.
- The Naked Sun by Isaac Asimov, the second book in his Robot series.
- Niourk by Stefan Wul, a Fleuve Noir Anticipation collection novel.
- Oms en série by Stefan Wul (in French), another Fleuve Noir Anticipation collection novel; filmed as La Planète sauvage in 1973.
- On the Beach by Nevil Shute, post-apocalyptic novel where survivors in Australia await inevitable fallout.
- Rocket to Limbo by Alan E. Nourse, a space mission discovers a telekinetic city, granting the crew psychic powers and ambassadorial roles.
- Rogue in Space by Fredric Brown, a sentient asteroid interacts with fugitives, builds a new world, and resurrects a woman, creating a secluded Eden.
- The Shrouded Planet by "Robert Randall", a fix-up collaboration between Robert Silverberg and Randall Garrett.
- Star Born by Andre Norton, colonists on an alien planet struggle for independence and survival.
- The Strange World of Planet X by Rene Ray, Countess of Midleton, a novelization of her 1956 TV serial of the same name.
- Wasp by Eric Frank Russell, a man disrupts an alien society using guerrilla tactics during an interstellar war.
- Wythnos yng Nghymru Fydd [A Week in the Wales that Will Be] by Islwyn Ffowc Elis (in Welsh), a time traveler explores a future Wales with utopian and dystopian elements.

=== Short stories ===
- "Call Me Joe" (novelette) by Poul Anderson, Astounding Science Fiction (April).
- "Get Out of My Sky" (novella) by James Blish, Astounding Science Fiction (January–February).

=== Juveniles ===
- Citizen of the Galaxy by Robert A. Heinlein (juvenile), a boy rises from slavery to uncover his mysterious heritage and destiny.
- City on the Moon by Murray Leinster, final book of the To the Stars series following Space Platform and Space Tug.
- Danny Dunn on a Desert Island by Raymond Abrashkin and Jay Williams, second novel in the Danny Dunn series.

=== Children's books ===
- Blast Off at Woomera by Hugh Walters, first book in the Chris Godfrey of U.N.E.X.A. series.
- The Voices of Mars by Patrick Moore, continues Mission to Mars, and The Domes of Mars.

=== Comics ===
- First appearance of the Challengers of the Unknown, by Jack Kirby, is published in Showcase #8 by DC Comics.

== Movies ==
Title	Director	Cast	Country	Subgenre/Notes
20 Million Miles to Earth	Nathan H. Juran	William Hopper, Joan Taylor, Frank Puglia, John Zaremba	United States	Adventure Family Fantasy Horror Thriller
The 27th Day	William Asher	Gene Barry, Valerie French, George Voskovec	United States	
The Astounding She-Monster	Ronnie Ashcroft	Jeanne Tatum, Ewing Brown, Robert Clarke	United States	Crime Horror
The Amazing Colossal Man	Bert I. Gordon	Glenn Langan, Cathy Downs, William Hudson	United States	
Attack of the Crab Monsters	Roger Corman	Richard Garland, Pamela Duncan, Russell Johnson	United States	Horror
Beginning of the End	Bert I. Gordon	Peter Graves, Peggie Castle, Morris Ankrum	United States	Horror
The Black Scorpion	Edward Ludwig	Richard Denning, Mara Corday, Carlos Rivas	United States	Horror
The Brain from Planet Arous	Nathan H. Juran	John Agar, Joyce Meadows, Robert Fuller	United States	Action Adventure Horror Thriller
The Cyclops	Bert I. Gordon	James Craig, Gloria Talbott, Lon Chaney Jr.	United States	Horror
The Deadly Mantis	Nathan H. Juran	Craig Stevens, William Hopper, Alix Talton	United States	Family Horror Thriller
From Hell It Came	Dan Milner	Tod Andrews, Tina Carver, Linda Watkins	United States	Horror
The Giant Claw	Fred Sears	Jeff Morrow, Mara Corday, Morris Ankrum	United States	Fantasy Horror Thriller
Half Human	Ishirō Honda, Kenneth G. Crane	John Carradine, Morris Ankrum	Japan; United States	Horror. USA version. See 1955 for Japan version
The Incredible Shrinking Man	Jack Arnold	Grant Williams, Randy Stuart, April Kent	United States	Horror (Note: Winner of a Hugo Award for Best Dramatic Presentation in 1958.)
Invasion of the Saucer Men	Edward L. Cahn	Steve Terrell, Gloria Castillo, Frank Gorshin, Lyn Osborne	United States	Family Horror
The Invisible Boy	Herman Hoffman	Richard Eyer, Philip Abbott, Diane Brewster	United States	Adventure Comedy Family
The Invisible Man vs. The Human Fly	Mitsuo Murayama	Ryuji Shinagawa, Yoshiro Kitahara, Junko Kano	Japan	Only released in Japan
I Was a Teenage Frankenstein	Herbert L. Strock	Whit Bissell, Phyllis Coates, Robert Burton, Gary Conway, George Lynn	USA	Drama Fantasy Horror
I Was a Teenage Werewolf	Gene Fowler Jr.	Michael Landon, Whit Bissell, Yvonne Lime	USA	Horror
Kronos	Kurt Neumann	Jeff Morrow, Barbara Lawrence, John Emery, George O'Hanlon	United States	Action Drama Horror Romance
The Land Unknown	Virgil Vogel	Jock Mahoney, Shawn Smith, William Reynolds	United States	Adventure Fantasy Thriller
The Man Without a Body	Charles Saunders, W. Lee Wilder	Robert Hutton, George Coulouris, Julia Arnall	United Kingdom	Horror
The Man Who Turned to Stone	László Kardos	Victor Jory, William Hudson	United States	Horror
The Monolith Monsters	John Sherwood	Grant Williams, Lola Albright, Les Tremayne	United States	Drama Horror
Monster from Green Hell	Kenneth G. Crane	Jim Davis	United States	Horror
The Monster That Challenged the World	Arnold Laven	Tim Holt, Audrey Dalton, Hans Conried	United States	Horror Thriller
The Mysterians (a.k.a. Chikyû Bôeigun)	Ishirō Honda	Kenji Sahara, Yumi Shirakawa, Momoko Kochi	Japan	Action Family Thriller Kaijū
The Night the World Exploded	Fred Sears	Kathryn Grant, William Leslie, Tristram Coffin	United States	
Not of This Earth	Roger Corman	Paul Birch, Beverly Garland, Morgan Jones	United States	Horror
Quatermass 2	Val Guest	Brian Donlevy, John Longden, Sid James	United Kingdom	Horror (Note: U.S. title: Enemy from Space.)
Road To The Stars (a.k.a. Doroga K Zvezdam)	Pavel Klushantsev	Georgi Solovyov	Soviet Union	Biography
The Secret of Two Oceans	Konstantin Pipinashvili	Igor Vladimirov, Sergej Golovanov, Sergej Stoljarov	Soviet Union	Adventure Crime Fantasy Mystery
She Devil	Kurt Neumann	Albert Dekker, Jack Kelly, Mari Blanchard	United States	Crime Horror Thriller
The Unearthly	Brooke Peters	John Carradine, Myron Healey, Allison Hayes	United States	Horror
The Unknown Terror	Charles Marquis Warren	John Howard, Mala Powers, Paul E. Richards, May Wynn	United States	Horror
The Vampire	Paul Landres	John Beal, Colleen Gray, Kenneth Tobey	United States	Horror Thriller
The Robot vs. The Aztec Mummy (a.k.a. La momia azteca contra el robot humano)	Rafael Portillo	Ramon Gay, Rosita Arenas, Luis Aceves Castaneda	Mexico	Horror

== Awards ==
No Hugo Award was awarded in 1957.

== See also ==
- 1957 in science
