= Hungarian science fiction =

Hungarian science fiction comprises books and films in the fiction genre produced all across Hungary.

== Early examples ==
Kuczka and Pohl date the beginnings of Hungarian science fiction to the late eighteenth century, following Enlightened examples from NorthWestern Europe. Two early examples they note are György Bessenyei's Tarimenes utazása (The Voyage of Tarimenes) (1804) and Sandor Barotzi's A mostani adeptus (The Adept of Our Days) (1810), Ferenc Ney's Utazás a Holdba (Voyages to the Moon) (1836), Miklós Jósika's Végnapok (The Last Days) (1847), and prominently Mór Jókai's Jövő század regénye (Novel of the Next Century) (1872).

Some of Jókai's pupils continued this tradition: Titusz Tóvölgyi's Az új világ (The New World) (1888), and István Makay's novel Repülőgépen a Holdba (By Airplane to the Moon) (1899).

Translation of foreign authors was important, such as works by Jules Verne, H. G. Wells, Albert Robida, Edward Bellamy, J.-H. Rosny aîné, Jerzy Żuławski, and Jack London.

== Early twentieth century ==
During this period the literary magazine Nyugat (The West) was a key promoter of the genre. Prominently, some of the works by Frigyes Karinthy, Sándor Szathmári, and Mihaly Babits gained popularity.

== Kádar era ==
During the Kádár era (1956-1989), the work of Péter Kuczka, particularly his translation of Anglo-American science fiction was key in promoting the genre. According to Sohár, up to 1965, translation occurred indirectly vía publications in Russian, including works by Isaac Asimov. A Science Fiction Work Committee was formed in the Hungarian Writers' Union that run the quarterly journal, SF Tajekoztato.

== Authors ==
- Mihály Babits
- Júlia Goldman
- Ilona Hegedűs
- Péter Hédervári
- Frigyes Karinthy
- Péter Kuczka
- György Kulin
- László L. Lőrincz
- István Nemere
- Jenő Rejtő
- Sándor Szathmári
- Dezső Kemény
- Péter Lengyel
- Hernády Gyula
- Mesterházi Lajos
- Darázs Endre
- Balázs Arpád
- Bogati Péter
- Bárány Tamás
- Örkény István
- Cserna József
- Moldova György
- Péter Zsoldos

== Films ==
- Alraune (1918 film)
- The Adventures of Pirx (1973)
- A feladat (1975)
- A halhatatlanság halála directed by András Rajnai in 1976 based on The End of Eternity by Isaac Asimov
- The Fortress (1979 film)
- 6:3 Play It Again Tutti (1999)
- 1 (2009 film)
- Thelomeris (2011)

=== Animation ===
- Les Maîtres du temps (lit. The Masters of Time, a.k.a. Time Masters, Az idő urai in Hungarian) is a 1982 Franco-Hungarian animated science fiction feature film directed by René Laloux and designed by Mœbius. It is based on the 1958 science fiction novel L'Orphelin de Perdide (The Orphan of Perdide) by Stefan Wul.
- The Tragedy of Man (2011 film)

== Magazines ==
- Galaktika (1972-1995)

Galaktika was a science fiction magazine of Hungary, published between 1972 and 1995. The peak of 94,000 copies was very high (compared to the population of Hungary [pop. 10 million] while Analog magazine was printed in 120,000 copies in the United States [pop. well over 200 million]), when reached its peak period, it was one of the largest science-fiction magazines of the world, and the quality of individual volumes was high.

A newer publication with the same name has been published since 2004 that is known for its practice of translating and publishing works without obtaining the permission of the authors and without paying them.

== Video games ==
- Crysis Warhead (2008)
