= Nebula Award for Best Script =

Science fiction and fantasy literary award

- Awarded for: The best science fiction or fantasy movie or television episode script released in the prior calendar year
- Presented by: Science Fiction and Fantasy Writers Association
- First award: 1974
- Final award: 2009
- Website: sfwa.org/nebula-awards/

The Nebula Award for Best Script was given each year by the Science Fiction and Fantasy Writers Association (SFWA) for science fiction or fantasy scripts for movies or television episodes. Awards are also given out for published literary works in the novel, novella, novelette, and short story categories. The Nebula Award for Best Script was awarded annually from 1974 through 1978, and from 2000 through 2009. It was presented under several names; in 1974, 1975, and 1977 the award was for Best Dramatic Presentation, while in 1976 the award was for Best Dramatic Writing. The award was discontinued in 2010 and replaced with Ray Bradbury Nebula Award for Outstanding Dramatic Presentation; this award was not originally a Nebula but was made one retroactively in 2019, and is presented at the Nebula Awards Ceremony and follows Nebula rules and procedures. The Nebula Awards have been described as one of "the most important of the American science fiction awards" and "the science-fiction and fantasy equivalent" of the Emmy Awards.

== Selection process ==
Nebula Award nominees and winners are chosen by members of the SFWA, though the authors of the nominees do not need to be a member. Works are nominated each year between November 15 and February 15 by published authors who are members of the organization, and the six works that receive the most nominations then form the final ballot, with additional nominees possible in the case of ties. Members may then vote on the ballot throughout March, and the final results are presented at the Nebula Awards ceremony in May. Authors are not permitted to nominate their own works, and ties in the final vote are broken, if possible, by the number of nominations the works received. Beginning with the 2009 awards, the rules were changed to the current format. Prior to then, the eligibility period for nominations was defined as one year after the publication date of the work, which allowed the possibility for works to be nominated in the calendar year after their publication and then reach the final ballot in the calendar year after that. Works were added to a preliminary ballot for the year if they had ten or more nominations, which were then voted on to create a final ballot, to which the SFWA organizing panel was also allowed to add an additional work.

== Award statistics ==
During the 15 nomination years, 14 awards for Best Script have been given, including the special award given to Star Wars Episode IV: A New Hope in 1978 but not including 1977, since no nominee was given the award. No winner was declared that year as "no award" received the highest number of votes. With three awards The Lord of the Rings film trilogy earned the most awards or nominations of any franchise. The Christopher Nolan Batman movies, Battlestar Galactica, Buffy the Vampire Slayer, and Doctor Who franchises have each had two nominations, but no wins. Hayao Miyazaki, Christopher Nolan, Joss Whedon, and The Lord of the Rings screenwriters have had the most nominations, with three each.

== Winners and nominees ==
SFWA currently identifies the awards by the year of publication, that is, the year prior to the year in which the award is given. Entries with a yellow background and an asterisk (*) next to the writer's name have won the award; the other entries are the other nominees on the shortlist. Entries with a gray background and a plus sign (+) mark a year when "no award" was selected as the winner.

* Winners and joint winners
+ No winner selected

Winners and nominees
Year	Writer(s)	Work	Publisher	Ref.
1973	Stanley R. Greenberg (script), Harry Harrison (original novel)*	Soylent Green	Metro-Goldwyn-Mayer	
1973	Michael Crichton	Westworld	Metro-Goldwyn-Mayer	
1973	Bruce Jay Friedman	Steambath	PBS	
1973	Brian Moore (script, original novel)	Catholics	ITV	
1974	Woody Allen*	Sleeper	United Artists	
1974	Christopher Isherwood and Don Bachardy (script), Mary Shelley (original novel)	Frankenstein: The True Story	NBC	
1974	René Laloux and Roland Topor (script), Stefan Wul (original novel)	Fantastic Planet	Argos Films	
1975	Mel Brooks and Gene Wilder (script), Mary Shelley (original novel)*	Young Frankenstein	United Artists	
1975	John Carpenter and Dan O'Bannon	Dark Star	Jack H. Harris Enterprises	
1975	L. Q. Jones (script), Harlan Ellison (original novella)	A Boy and His Dog	LQ/JAF	
1975	William Harrison (script, original story)	Rollerball	United Artists	
1976	(no award)+			
1976	Harlan Ellison	Harlan! Harlan Ellison Reads Harlan Ellison	Alternative World Recordings	
1976	David Zelag Goodman (script), William F. Nolan and George Clayton Johnson (original novel)	Logan's Run	United Artists	
1976	Paul Mayersberg (script), Walter Tevis (original novel)	The Man Who Fell to Earth	Columbia Pictures	
1977	George Lucas*	Star Wars Episode IV: A New Hope (Note: In 1978, Star Wars was given a special Nebula Award for the publication year 1977. No other works were nominated.)	20th Century Fox	
1999	M. Night Shyamalan*	The Sixth Sense	Hollywood Pictures	
1999	Robert J. Avrech (script), Jane Yolen (original novel)	The Devil's Arithmetic	Showtime Networks	
1999	Brad Bird and Tim McCanlies (script), Ted Hughes (original novel)	The Iron Giant	Warner Bros.	
1999	John Millerman	The Uranus Experiment: Part 2	Private Black Label	
1999	Larry and Andy Wachowski	The Matrix	Warner Bros.	
2000	David Howard and Robert Gordon*	Galaxy Quest	DreamWorks	
2000	Frank Darabont (script), Stephen King (original novel)	The Green Mile	Warner Bros.	
2000	Hayao Miyazaki (script) and Neil Gaiman (English translation)	Princess Mononoke	Studio Ghibli/Miramax Films	
2000	Charlie Kaufman	Being John Malkovich	Propaganda Films	
2000	M. Night Shyamalan	Unbreakable	Touchstone Pictures	
2000	Kevin Smith	Dogma	View Askew Productions	
2001	James Schamus, Kuo Jung Tsai, and Hui-Ling Wang (script), Wang Dulu (original novel)*	Crouching Tiger, Hidden Dragon	Sony Pictures Classics	
2001	Ethan and Joel Coen	O Brother, Where Art Thou?	Touchstone Pictures	
2001	Tom DeSanto and Bryan Singer (story), David Hayter (screenplay)	X-Men	20th Century Fox	
2001	Joss Whedon	Buffy the Vampire Slayer: "The Body"	Fox Television Studios/Mutant Enemy Productions	
2002	Fran Walsh, Philippa Boyens, and Peter Jackson (script), J. R. R. Tolkien (original novel)*	The Lord of the Rings: The Fellowship of the Ring	New Line Cinema	
2002	Ted Elliott and Terry Rossio	Shrek	DreamWorks	
2002	Michael Taylor (script), Stephen King (original concept)	The Dead Zone: "Unreasonable Doubt"	DreamWorks	
2002	Joss Whedon	Buffy the Vampire Slayer: "Once More, With Feeling"	Warner Bros.	
2003	Fran Walsh, Philippa Boyens, Stephen Sinclair, and Peter Jackson (script), J. R. R. Tolkien (original novel)*	The Lord of the Rings: The Two Towers	New Line Cinema	
2003	Scott Frank and Jon Cohen (script), Philip K. Dick (original story)	Minority Report	20th Century Fox/DreamWorks	
2003	David A. Goodman	Futurama: "Where No Fan Has Gone Before"	Fox Broadcasting Company	
2003	Hayao Miyazaki (script), Cindy Davis Hewitt, and Donald H. Hewitt (English translation)	Spirited Away	Studio Ghibli/The Walt Disney Company	
2003	Andrew Stanton, Bob Peterson, and David Reynolds	Finding Nemo	Pixar/The Walt Disney Company	
2004	Fran Walsh, Philippa Boyens, and Peter Jackson (script), J. R. R. Tolkien (original novel)*	The Lord of the Rings: The Return of the King	New Line Cinema	
2004	Brad Bird	The Incredibles	Pixar/The Walt Disney Company	
2004	J. Mackye Gruber and Eric Bress	The Butterfly Effect	New Line Cinema	
2004	Charlie Kaufman & Michel Gondry	Eternal Sunshine of the Spotless Mind	Focus Features	
2005	Joss Whedon*	Serenity	Universal Studios/Mutant Enemy Productions	
2005	Carla Robinson, Bradley Thompson, and David Weddle	Battlestar Galactica: "Act of Contrition/You Can't Go Home Again"	Sci-Fi Channel	
2006	Hayao Miyazaki (script), Cindy Davis Hewitt, and Donald H. Hewitt (English translation)	Howl's Moving Castle	Studio Ghibli/The Walt Disney Company	
2006	Christopher Nolan and David S. Goyer	Batman Begins	Warner Bros.	
2006	Michael Taylor	Battlestar Galactica: "Unfinished Business"	Sci-Fi Channel	
2006	Steven Moffat	Doctor Who: "The Girl in the Fireplace"	BBC Cymru Wales/BBC One	
2007	Guillermo del Toro*	Pan's Labyrinth	Picturehouse	
2007	Alfonso Cuarón, Timothy J. Sexton, David Arata, Mark Fergus, and Hawk Ostby (script), P. D. James (original novel)	Children of Men	Universal Studios	
2007	Steven Moffat	Doctor Who: "Blink"	BBC Cymru Wales/BBC One	
2007	Christopher Nolan and Jonathan Nolan (script), Christopher Priest (original novel)	The Prestige	Touchstone Pictures	
2007	Larry and Andy Wachowski (script), David Lloyd (original graphic novel)	V for Vendetta	Warner Bros.	
2007	Marc Scott Zicree and Michael Reaves	Star Trek: New Voyages: "World Enough and Time"	Cawley Entertainment Company/The Magic Time Company	
2008	Andrew Stanton, Jim Reardon and Pete Docter*	WALL-E	Pixar/The Walt Disney Company	
2008	Christopher Nolan, Jonathan Nolan, and David S. Goyer	The Dark Knight	Warner Bros.	
2008	Brad Wright	Stargate Atlantis: "The Shrine"	Metro-Goldwyn-Mayer	

== See also ==
- Hugo Award for Best Dramatic Presentation
- Ray Bradbury Award for Outstanding Dramatic Presentation
