= L'Orphelin de Perdide =

1958 novel by Stefan Wul

The Orphan of Perdide
- Author: Stefan Wul
- Original title: L'Orphelin de Perdide
- Illustrator: René Brantonne
- Series: Anticipation
- Genre: Novel science fiction
- Publisher: Fleuve Noir
- Publication date: 1958
- Publication place: France
- Media type: paper
- Pages: 186

L'Orphelin de Perdide (The Orphan of Perdide) is a French science fiction novel by Stefan Wul, published in 1958, and the basis of the 1982 animated film Les Maîtres du temps. It was Wul's seventh to be published in the Fleuve Noir Anticipation collection of science fiction novels. It consists of three parts divided into sixteen chapters and was written by Wul in three weeks.

== Plot summary ==
On the dangerous planet Perdide, a father and his four-year-old son, Claude, are trying to escape a swarm of giant hornets. Exhausted, the father managed to send a distress message to his friend Max, but failed to reach him directly, and instructed his son to quickly get into the forest on the hill. Before dying, the father gives his transceiver to Claude and tells him to do what it says. The boy finds himself alone in a strange forest with his only companion the small egg-shaped object.

Aboard the ship The Big Max, the smuggler Max discovers the message from his friend and contact Perdide. Little Claude immediately responds, speaking to his microphone as if it were a person. He then decided to divert its route to Perdide to save the child. His two passengers, Belle and her husband Martin, who have paid a large sum to be taken to the planet Sidoine, protest in vain. Max maintains communication with Claude and instructs him on how to survive in a hostile environment.

The Big Max lands on the beautiful planet, Devil-Ball, where Max joins his old friend Silbad. The aging Silbad has had a metal plate on his head since he was attacked by hornets on Perdide in his childhood, and knows about the dangers of the planet. Touched by the story of Claude, he boards The Big Max and spends most of his time telling stories to the child and to protect the dangers of the forest.

The four passengers take turns at the microphone to occupy the little Claude. Impatient at the side trip, Martin tried to encourage Claude to enter a dangerous cave, and arrive sooner at Sidoine. Silbad surprises and violently beats him, then Max locks Martin in a cabin of his spaceship. Belle is shocked by the attitude of her husband.

When they make a stopover on the planet Gamma 10, Martin takes the opportunity to escape. Max starts to pursue him, but found Martin's dead body, inert in the sand. He is soon surrounded by a bunch of ex-prisoners of Sidoine stranded on the planet and is taken to a troglodyte village. Silbad eventually comes to search for Max, and is also captured. The two men are presented to the Master who intends to feed them to his hungry monster. But Max and Silbad manage to escape, then provide food to the Master and his monster, and promises to bring back help for the prisoners stranded on the planet.

In his approach to the planet Perdide, The Big Max is caught in unexpectedly intense interstellar and interplanetary traffic and are detained by the police. Max and Silbad question the authorities and learn to their amazement that Perdide is a developed planet, urbanized and largely colonized since its "Enhancement", nearly sixty years earlier. Max and Silbad realise that their space journey at 99% of the speed of light created a time lag of a century between them and the planet Perdide. Hearing the news, Silbad has a heart attack.

The Big Max lands on the planet Perdide and Max goes in search of a local historian to understand how the tragic story of the little Claude ended, a hundred years earlier. Max then meets the elderly Bader who saved Claude from an attack of giant hornets and then adopted him. The boy, suffering from amnesia, began to be called Sylvain Bader, but everyone knew him as "Silbad". Max then goes back to the hospital to see the old Silbad dying in horrible suffering without knowing the truth. Max returns with Belle to Devil-Ball to start a new world.

== Film adaptation ==
In 1982 the novel was made into an animated film under the title Les Maîtres du temps (Time Masters), directed by René Laloux and designed by the comics artist Moebius. It was Laloux's second animated adaptation of a Wul novel, following his 1973 film Fantastic Planet, based on Oms en série (1957).

Laloux made a number of changes in the adaptation, particularly at the end of the story. He later commented that "in all Wul novels, mostly, it is a great idea to start. The first two thirds are great, well built, with a coherence in playwriting, etc. And the final third is a little shitty. Or he ran out of time, got tired, or started getting lazy."

The main differences between the novel and film are:

Novel	Film
Stranded pirates on the planet Gamma 10 are headed by an obese cannibalistic monster.	Stranded pirates on the planet Gamma 10 are robbed of their individuality and become winged beings under the control of a Pure Spirit.
No extraterrestrial intelligent beings other than humans.	Several intelligent races, including the gnomes on Devil's Ball, the Masters of Time, and several non-human pirates.
Prince Bôz dies without glory by trying to escape.	Prince Maton sacrifices himself to the Pure Spirit on Gamma 10 to save Jaffar's life.
In the final scene, the crew arrives on the planet Perdide and finds it fully colonized and developed. Max learns the truth about Claude by questioning his adoptive father.	In the final scene, the crew arrives on a huge space station. Jaffar learns the truth about Piel through the telepathic powers of the two gnomes.
