= Golden Age of Science Fiction =

Nostalgic view of American magazine science fiction in the 1930s and '50s

In the history of science fiction, the Golden Age is the period in which the genre is considered to have matured in American science fiction magazines, in particular Astounding Science Fiction; the period is usually referred to as the Golden Age of Science Fiction (as a whole), though sometimes more specifically as the Golden Age of Astounding. Its beginning is marked by John W. Campbell's assumption of the editorship of the magazine in the late 1930s. The end date is less agreed upon: it is often placed in the mid-1940s, though it ranges from 1941 to the early 1960s. Historiographically, the Golden Age follows the pulp era and precedes the New Wave.

Other eras have also been referred to as golden ages of science fiction in more specific contexts. For instance, the 1950s are considered to be the golden age of science fiction cinema. A common humorous statement is that "The Golden Age of science fiction is twelve" years old, or thereabouts.

== History ==
=== From Gernsback to Campbell ===
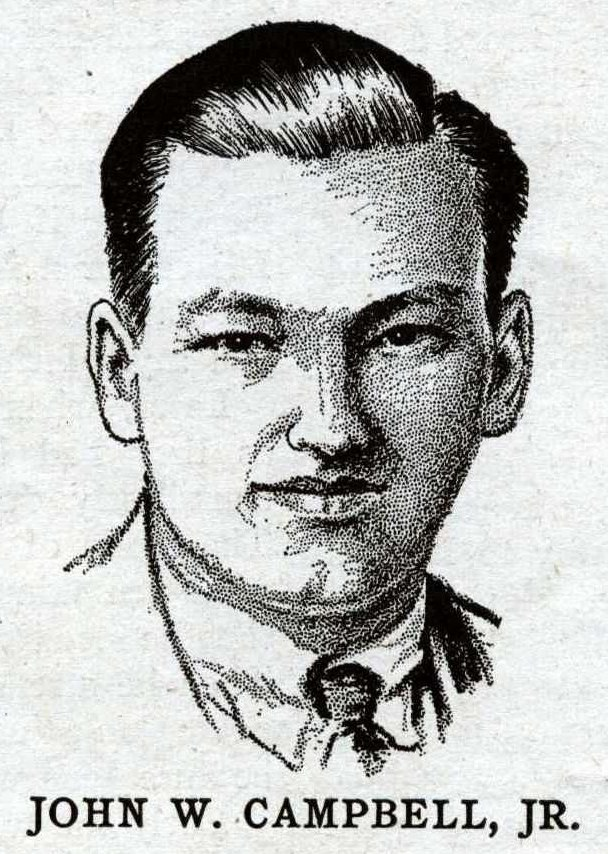
Sketch of John W. Campbell c. 1932

The first science fiction magazine was Hugo Gernsback's Amazing Stories, which was launched in 1926. This is usually considered the beginning of the pulp era of science fiction, though definitions vary. Several additional magazines by Gernsback and others appeared (and in some cases disappeared again) in the years that followed; by 1937, seven science fiction pulp magazines remained in publication. In October 1937, John W. Campbell became editor of Astounding Stories. He finished the already in-progress December 1937 issue and started exercising direct editorial control from the January 1938 issue onwards alongside outgoing editor F. Orlin Tremaine, changing the title to Astounding Science Fiction for the March 1938 issue, when he gained full editorial control. Campbell's editorship of Astounding is generally held to mark the beginning of the Golden Age, though the precise starting point varies slightly depending on definition—from 1937 at the earliest to 1940 at the latest.

Alva Rogers, in the 1964 book A Requiem for Astounding, writes that the period was both the Golden Age of science fiction as a whole and of Astounding in particular, and identifies the July 1939 issue as "the first real harbinger of Astounding's Golden Age". The July 1939 issue of Astounding has been adopted by others as the starting point of the Golden Age, and The Encyclopedia of Science Fiction writes that "The beginning of Campbell's particular Golden Age of SF can be pinpointed as the summer of 1939" more broadly. The July issue included "Black Destroyer", the first published story by A. E. van Vogt, as well as the first appearance by Isaac Asimov in the magazine with the story "Trends"; the August issue contained the first published story by Robert A. Heinlein, "Life-Line"; and the September issue had the first story by Theodore Sturgeon, "Ether Breather". Rogers nevertheless holds that, despite the appearance of these early stories, "it wasn't until 1940 that the Golden Age came into full being". Mike Ashley—who comments that the Golden Age of science fiction may be more appropriately referred to as the Golden Age of Astounding—similarly finds the July 1939 date arbitrary, viewing the change that happened as occurring gradually during 1938–1939 with each successive issue of Astounding contributing.

=== Campbell and Astounding ===
Campbell's instruction to his writers was refreshing: Write a story that could be published as a contemporary tale in a magazine published in the 25th century.
He also told them he wanted stories about aliens who could think as well as humans, but not like humans.

— Paul A. Carter, Anatomy of Wonder: A Critical Guide to Science Fiction (2004)

As editor of Astounding, Campbell took a proactive role. Even before he assumed the editorship, it had become the best-selling science fiction magazine and paid authors higher rates than its competitors did. This made Astounding a popular market and made it possible for Campbell to be selective. Campbell, who had been a science fiction writer before he became editor, had a strong sense of what made for good science fiction, and he would frequently demand revisions, revise himself, or outright reject stories that did not meet his exacting standards. One of his convictions was that the maturity of sf readership was greater than had previously been believed. He demanded that stories be logically sound, required greater scientific accuracy than had previously been the norm, and asked authors to consider what the effects of their ideas upon society and the individual would be. More broadly, he was not content with the prevailing literary quality that appeared in magazines at the time but insisted upon more proficient writing. In the words of Asimov, who started writing for Campbell around this time, "he found magazine science fiction childish, and he made it adult".

Campbell attracted some established writers such as Jack Williamson, Murray Leinster, and Clifford D. Simak; mainly, he discovered new ones like van Vogt, Asimov, Heinlein, and Sturgeon. He thus developed a stable of writers who were able to produce the kind of science fiction he wanted; authors who could not or would not write in Campbell's preferred style—the most high-profile example being Ray Bradbury—turned to his competitors instead. Campbell largely stopped writing himself, and instead frequently came up with ideas that he would have his writers turn into stories; for instance, Asimov credited Campbell with originating the plot for the 1941 short story "Nightfall", the underlying premise of the Foundation series, and the formulation of the Three Laws of Robotics. Lester del Rey later recalled a group of writers attempting to estimate the proportion of stories in Astounding that were based on Campbell's ideas, concluding that it must have exceeded half. Unlike many of his competitors at the time, Campbell was not expected by the publisher to write stories himself and was paid enough that it was not necessary for him to do so to supplement his income. He also only served as editor for Astounding (and, between 1939 and 1943, its fantasy companion Unknown), rather than needing to divide attention between multiple publications as several of his contemporaries did; Donald A. Wollheim credits Campbell's success as an editor in part to thus having time available to do the job with greater care. Michael R. Page, in The Cambridge History of Science Fiction, further points to Campbell being interested in science fiction for its own sake, rather than treating it solely as a business as the main science fiction editors before him (except Gernsback) had done.

By the late 1940s Astounding's dominance in the field was slowly beginning to be rivalled by Startling Stories, and the launch of The Magazine of Fantasy & Science Fiction in 1949 and Galaxy Science Fiction in 1950 ended it definitively. The 1950s saw the magazine market dominated by a triumvirate of Astounding, F&SF, and Galaxy. At the same time, the emergence of a new market for science fiction—books, especially paperbacks—shifted the genre's centre of gravity away from the magazines. Campbell's personal standing in the field also diminished. One reason was his increasing interest in various pseudoscientific concepts such as psionics and L. Ron Hubbard's Dianetics (a precursor to Scientology); Hubbard was one of Campbell's frequent contributors of fiction to both Astounding and Unknown, and in a controversial move, Campbell published his non-fiction article on Dianetics in the May 1950 issue of Astounding. Another was his hands-on editorial approach that many writers came to see as increasingly controlling rather than inspiring, leading them to publish elsewhere. A third was his political views, which grew increasingly overt, right-wing, and authoritarian—expressed in editorials that The Encyclopedia of Science Fiction suggests detracted his attention from collaborating with his writers—alienating a significant proportion of readers and writers alike.

=== End of the Golden Age ===
Opinions differ on when, exactly, the Golden Age ended. At the earliest, it is sometimes considered to have ended in 1941 when the United States entered World War II; at the latest, in the early 1960s with the advent of the New Wave of science fiction.

A common perspective is that it ended at the end of World War II or shortly thereafter. Paul A. Carter, in the 2004 edition of Anatomy of Wonder, attributes this in part to the atomic bombing of Hiroshima in August 1945 resulting in a loss of innocence for the field of science fiction; nuclear weapons had by then been anticipated in science fiction for a number of years, and Carter comments on these stories that "the boy cried wolf, and the wolf came". Rogers comments that it is much more difficult to put a date on the end of the Golden Age than on its beginning, noting that is often thought of as having lasted for the duration of the 1940s by those who did not experience it firsthand, whereas those who lived through it—and scholars—more typically view it as having ended around 1945. Rogers personally favours an end date of 1943, while acknowledging that many would consider this overly restrictive and granting that 1944–1945 "could be considered a Final Phase of the Golden Age". The Encyclopedia of Science Fiction writes that the Golden Age is often considered to have ended in 1946, but that this is difficult to justify in light of the writing talents emerging as important contributors to the field in the late 1940s and early 1950s, including Arthur C. Clarke and Frederik Pohl—commenting that it may be more apt to say that it ended for Astounding than for science fiction as a whole.

The Golden Age is sometimes considered to have lasted into the 1950s. Page places the end of the Golden Age in 1950, pointing among other things to the emergence of Astounding's first serious competitors in the form of F&SF and Galaxy and Campbell's publication of Hubbard's article on Dianetics. Amelia Beamer comments that the end point is often taken to be 1955, while David M. Higgins and Roby Duncan, in The Science Fiction Handbook, describe it as encompassing the late 1950s.

== Analysis ==
=== Causes ===
Besides the editorial influence of Campbell, George Mann identifies the broader cultural shift brought about by World War II as an important factor in determining the trajectory of the genre during this time period. Increasing scientific literacy among the readership has also been proposed as a contributing factor. Another aspect is that many of the emerging writers of the time had themselves grown up reading science fiction magazines. Carter further points to the rapid expansion of the market in the late 1930s, with a large number of new science fiction magazines going into print (a substantial proportion of which went out of business not long thereafter due to paper shortages during the war) and thus providing opportunities for aspiring writers.

=== Significance ===
According to The Encyclopedia of Science Fiction, the Golden Age was "the time when most of the themes and motifs of sf were taking their modern shape", a sentiment echoed by Mann and Page.

Ashley writes that Campbell's influence on the genre was largely confined to Astounding for several years, and that science fiction as a whole did not mature until the second half of the 1940s after the end of World War II.

The Encyclopedia of Science Fiction writes that overall, science fiction has been steadily improving over time, and that the Golden Age thus did not constitute a high-water mark of quality. Furthermore, science fiction works "of real literary quality" unrelated to the shifts occurring inside the magazines associated with the Golden Age were published outside of them both before and during this period. Nevertheless, "there is a residue of truth in the Golden Age myth"—in particular, that the kind of stories that appeared in the magazines seemed entirely unprecedented to most readers at the time, and that the genre saw what may have been the sharpest increase in quality in its entire history. Adam Roberts similarly finds the subsequent New Wave period of the 1960s and 1970s to have been a more fruitful era for the genre as it saw more diverse kinds of stories rather than being constrained by Campbell's dominant vision.

Mann comments that the Golden Age was "arguably the most important period in SF history". Page similarly writes that "Campbell's Golden Age remains a central locus point in the history of SF and its importance cannot be overestimated".

=== Characteristic style and tropes ===
Golden Age sf was characterized by a faith in the inevitability of dramatic scientific and technological progress, often accompanied by an optimistic belief that this progress would lead to social, political, and economic progress as well.

— M. Keith Booker & Anne-Marie Thomas, The Science Fiction Handbook

Roberts argues that the Golden Age was defined by Campbell's personal tastes and the genre dominated by the kinds of stories that met with his approval, identifying four distinct types: (1) "idea-fictions rooted in recognisable science", (2) "can-do stories about heroes solving problems or overcoming enemies", (3) "expansionist humano-centric narratives", and (4) "extrapolations of possible technologies and their social and human impacts". Algis Budrys in 1965 wrote of the "recurrent strain in 'Golden Age' science fiction of the 1940s—the implication that sheer technological accomplishment would solve all the problems, hooray, and that all the problems were what they seemed to be on the surface".

Alexei and Cory Panshin, in the 1989 book The World Beyond the Hill: Science Fiction and the Quest for Transcendence, write that stories became shorter by "packing more meaning into a smaller space".

== Other possible Golden Ages ==
The term "Golden Age of science fiction" was coined by science fiction fans nostalgic for the period, and the conventional Golden Age concept relates almost exclusively to magazine science fiction in the United States. A number of alternative date ranges have been proposed by other generations of readers or in other contexts. The Encyclopedia of Science Fiction notes that it often corresponds to the establishment of science fiction magazines in the local market, as in the case of Bulgarian, Hungarian, Japanese, and Polish science fiction. Similarly, the Golden Age of Australian science fiction is considered by some to be the 1990s, marked by the rivalry between the magazines Aurealis and Eidolon. The Golden Age of French science fiction, by contrast, is considered by The Encyclopedia of Science Fiction to be the 1880s through the 1930s, when there were no dedicated science fiction magazines but the genre regularly appeared in nonspecialized magazines. The Golden Age of science fiction cinema is generally held to be the 1950s, especially in a US context; a second Golden Age is sometimes considered to have started in 1977 with the releases of Star Wars and Close Encounters of the Third Kind.

In the context of English-language science fiction, other periods than the conventional one have also been considered Golden Ages. F. Orlin Tremaine, editor of Astounding between October 1933 and November 1937, said that "I believe we can safely call the years 1933–37 the first golden age of science fiction". Alva Rogers similarly deems the period encompassing the early 1940s the second Golden Age of Astounding, with the first being the first few years following Tremaine's appointment as editor. Some writers, among them Mike Ashley and Robert Silverberg, take the position that the real Golden Age occurred in the 1950s. Ashley, in the 2005 book Transformations: The Story of the Science Fiction Magazines from 1950 to 1970, writes that that decade, and its first half in particular, saw an unprecedented outpouring of science fiction by a diverse set of talented writers in a broad variety of magazines with Galaxy Science Fiction chief among them. In Ashley's opinion, Galaxy reached the same heights in the early 1950s as Astounding did in the early 1940s. Silverberg, in a 2010 essay, similarly points to a diversity of publishing options for writers of serious science fiction. Besides Galaxy, the other main newcomer The Magazine of Fantasy & Science Fiction, and a couple dozen other new or revitalized competitor magazines, Silverberg notes the emergence of a new market for science fiction: books, in both hardcover and paperback format, by publishers such as Doubleday and Ballantine Books. As a result, Silverberg argues, the financial risk to writers was lessened—if one outlet rejected a story there were plenty of others that might accept it, which had not been the case when the field was largely dominated by a single editor in the form of Campbell—and this made writing science fiction professionally a more attractive prospect, leading to prolific and proficient output from a large number of writers. Peter Nicholls, in the original 1979 edition of The Encyclopedia of Science Fiction, wrote that inasmuch as more first-rate science fiction had been written in the preceding decade than in any other ten-year period, one could argue that the Golden Age was then ongoing.

=== "The Golden Age of Science Fiction is twelve" ===
Grown men and women, sixty years old, twenty-five years old, sit around and talk about "the golden age of science fiction", remembering when every story in every magazine was a masterwork of daring, original thought. Some say the golden age was circa 1928; some say 1939; some favor 1953, or 1970, or 1984. The arguments rage till the small of the morning, and nothing is ever resolved.

Because the real golden age of science fiction is twelve.

— David G. Hartwell, Age of Wonders: Exploring the World of Science Fiction (1996)

An oft-repeated humorous remark posits that the "Golden Age" of science fiction is not a period in the history of the genre, but rather a nostalgic period in an individual's lifetime. The aphorism "The Golden Age of Science Fiction is twelve" was coined by science fiction fan Peter Graham, one of the editors of the fanzine Void, c. 1960. Many variations exist, sometimes giving the age as 13 or 14. The reason is often given as this being the age when most start reading science fiction, first experience a sense of wonder, or both.

== See also ==
- Timeline of science fiction
- The Golden Age of Science Fiction: An Anthology (1981), compiled by Kingsley Amis; works originally published between 1949 and 1962
- The Mammoth Book of Golden Age Science Fiction (1989), anthology edited by Isaac Asimov, Martin H. Greenberg, and Charles G. Waugh; works originally produced 1941 to 1947.
- Golden Age of Comic Books – largely coterminous period in the history of comics
