= Wasp (novel) =

1957 novel by Eric Frank Russell

- First edition
- Author: Eric Frank Russell
- Cover artist: Ric Binkley
- Language: English
- Genre: Science fiction
- Publisher: Avalon Books
- Publication date: 1957
- Publication place: United States
- Media type: Print (Hardcover)
- Pages: 223

Wasp is a 1957 science fiction novel by English author Eric Frank Russell. Terry Pratchett (author of the Discworld series of fantasy books) stated that he "can't imagine a funnier terrorists' handbook." Wasp is often considered Russell's best novel.

The title of Wasp comes from the idea that the main character's actions and central purpose mimic that particular insect; just as something as small as a wasp can terrorise a much larger creature in control of a car to the point of causing a crash and killing the occupants, so the defeat of an enemy may be wrought via psychological and guerrilla warfare by a small, but deadly, antagonist in their midst.

== Plot summary ==
Set in the future, the story is about protagonist James Mowry and an inter-planetary war between humans (collectively referred to as "Terrans") and the Sirians (collectively referred to as the Sirian Empire, from Sirius). The war has been on for nearly a year as the story begins. The Terrans, while technologically more advanced than the Sirians, are outnumbered and out-gunned twelve-to-one.

The Sirians are a humanoid species that share many of the same physical characteristics as their Terran enemies. Some of the more noticeable differences are their purple-faced complexions, pinned-back ears and a bow-legged gait. The Sirian Empire is reminiscent of fascist states that existed in the Second World War; they frequently employ a much-feared secret police force named the Kaimina Tempiti, or Kaitempi; they censor much of their media and they quell opposition to the government or the war through the use of violence and intimidation.

The novel begins by introducing James Mowry as he is being recruited by the Terran government to infiltrate enemy lines; to become a "wasp", in the sense portrayed in the opening passages of the novel. His recruitment is somewhat less than voluntary: Mowry is offered the alternative of conscription and assignment to the front. His dossier states that he can be counted on to do anything provided the alternative is worse; he accepts the assignment.

Despite being coerced, Mowry is an ideal recruit, having spent the first seventeen years of his life living under the Sirian Empire. After extensive technical training and surgery to make him appear to be Sirian, he is sent to the Sirian outpost world of Jaimec to begin his mission. The first phase of his mission involves placing stickers with subversive slogans, such as "War makes wealth for the few, misery for the many. At the right time, Dirac Angestun Gesept will punish the former, bring aid and comfort to the latter" and "Those who stand upon the platform and openly approve the war will stand upon the scaffold and weepingly regret it. Dirac Angestun Gesept" all over the Jaimecan towns in the hope of beginning to create the first murmurings of confusion and concern in Sirian society.

Mowry begins the second phase: sending letters to people of importance informing them of deaths by a mythical rebel organisation named Dirac Angestun Gesept (Sirian Freedom Party). Mowry moves on to phase three, the hiring of Sirian civilians as contract killers to assassinate prominent members of the Kaitempi and other government officials. With the Sirians becoming more concerned about the disruption they believe the D.A.G. is causing, Mowry's success allows him to move on to phase four.

Mowry plants fake wire tapping devices on several buildings (including the Kaitempi headquarters) to engender paranoia. He also continues to spread rumours via Sirian civilians to plant other seeds of doubt among the populace.

With a Terran invasion imminent, Mowry is told to skip to phase nine, the sabotaging of Jaimecan sea-borne commerce to divert Sirian concern from the real – and approaching – threat. This time, the Terrans strike and the invasion begins. Mowry is captured by a Terran occupation force and is held for a few days before a government man recognises that he is Terran. The novel ends with a government man informing Mowry that a wasp on another world has been captured and that he is the replacement.

== Publication history ==
Wasp was first published in the United States by Avalon Books in November 1957. In 1958, a revised and expanded version of the book was published by Dennis Dobson in the United Kingdom. This version, marketed as "unabridged", was first published in the United States by Ballantine Books in 1986, though the shorter version was published the same year in the United Kingdom by Methuen. When Gollancz reprinted the book in 2000 as an SF Collector's Edition, as well as in 2013 for its SF Masterworks series, they also used the shorter 1957 text.

== Themes ==
The novel portrays the Sirian Empire's censorship, suppression and police state as folly and oppression. Wasp frequently employs wry, black humour when dealing with these ideas and themes.

== Reception ==
Terry Pratchett talks of the ironic nature in Russell's storytelling; that Wasp is a "fun[ny] terrorists' handbook". An example of this humour is found in the protagonist's letter to the Sirian Central Bureau of Records in which he mockingly registers the rebel organisation "Dirac Angestun Gesept" as a legitimate organisation:

Title of organization: Dirac Angestun Gesept.
Purpose of organization: Destruction of present government and termination of war against Terra.
Customary meeting place: Wherever Kaitempi can't find us.
Names and address of elected officers: You'll find out when it's too late.
Attach hereto complete list of members: Nar.

The novel has also been praised for its gritty realism. Along with the alien culture being more believable by including slang (such as "yar" for yes and "nar" for no), Mowry's creative disruption is seen as astute. As Rupert Neethling of infinity plus states, "One has to wonder whether Eric Frank Russell applied firsthand knowledge of espionage or sabotage when writing his 1957 classic, Wasp. At the very least, he seems to have had access to some kind of saboteur's checklist". As Russell was in the Royal Air Force during the Second World War, he may well have had experience of the operations of the British Special Operations Executive agents who were trained to disrupt the Nazis in occupied Europe in much the same way as Mowry does in Wasp.

Galaxy reviewer Floyd C. Gale praised the novel, saying: "Russell has invested this hard-boiled yarn with plenty of action and authenticity." Dave Langford reviewed Wasp for White Dwarf #76 and stated that "Fast and funny - but less so than Granada's definitive editions, which like Dobson's hardback gained much from Russell's later (1958) revisions". James Sallis, writing in The Boston Globe, discusses how prescient Russell now seems. Wasp "gives off jolts of shock that Russell could not have anticipated". Sallis quoted Russell:

Mail would be examined, and all suspicious parcels would be taken apart in a blast-proof room. There'd be a city-wide search with radiation-detectors for the component parts of a fission bomb. Civil defence would be alerted in readiness to cope with a mammoth explosion that might or might not take place. Anyone on the streets who walked with a secretive air and wore a slightly mad expression would be arrested and hauled in for questioning.

While letter bombs and small nuclear weapons were not unheard-of in 1957, the book anticipates the bombing campaigns of the Troubles from the late 60s and the fear of nuclear terrorism from the mid-70s.

== Historical data ==
Although depicted as futuristic by virtue of travel between (and war between) multiple words, most of the features of the Sirian society are one-for-one copies of human societies known to the author. Inasmuch as the story describes details of daily life, transportation, urban structure, technology, media, the underworld, shipping, bureaucracy, and so on, it supplies historians with descriptive data showing what values English-speaking society held in the mid-1950s.

== See also ==
- 1957 in science fiction
- Operation Periwig, an SOE plan to waste Nazi resources by feigning resistance groups within Germany
