= Les Maîtres du temps =

1982 French animated film directed by René Laloux

- Directed by: René Laloux Tibor Hernádi (technical director)
- Written by: Mœbius René Laloux Jean-Patrick Manchette Stefan Wul
- Based on: L'Orphelin de Perdide by Stefan Wul
- Produced by: Miklós Salusinszky
- Starring: Jean Valmont Michel Elias Frédéric Legros Yves-Marie Maurin Monique Thierry Sady Rebbot
- Cinematography: Zoltán Bacsó András Klausz Mihály Kovács Árpád Lossonczy
- Edited by: Dominique Boischot
- Music by: Jean-Pierre Bourtayre Pierre Tardy Christian Zanesi
- Production company: Télécip TF1 Films Production Westdeutscher Rundfunk Südwestfunk Radio-Télévision Suisse Romande British Broadcasting Corporation Pannónia Filmstúdió Hungarofilm
- Distributed by: Compagnie Commerciale Française Cinématographique
- Release date: 24 March 1982 (France)
- Running time: 79 minutes
- Countries: France; West Germany; Switzerland; United Kingdom; Hungary
- Language: French
- Box office: $27,241

Les Maîtres du temps (lit. The Masters of Time, a.k.a. Time Masters; Herrscher der Zeit in German; Az idő urai in Hungarian) is a 1982 independent animated science fiction film directed by René Laloux and designed by Mœbius. It is based on the 1958 science fiction novel L'Orphelin de Perdide (The Orphan of Perdide) by Stefan Wul.

The film centres on a boy, Piel, who is stranded on Perdide, a desert planet where giant killer hornets live. He awaits rescue by the space pilot Jaffar, the exiled prince Matton, his sister Belle and Jaffar's old friend Silbad who are trying to reach Perdide and save Piel before it is too late.

== Plot ==
Claude races across the planet Perdide with his son Piel. He sends a message to his friend Jaffar, telling him that his wife Anne was killed by indigenous giant hornets. After a crash wrecks their vehicle and he cannot extricate himself, Claude lets Piel down from the wreckage and hands him an interstellar transceiver, telling him that it is named "Mike" and will talk to him, and to do whatever Mike tells him to do. After Claude sends Piel to the Dolongs, a nearby forest which repulses the hornets, the vehicle explodes.

On his spaceship the Double Triangle 22, Jaffar receives Claude's last message. Before heading for Perdide, he decides to seek out his friend Silbad, who has experience in living on Perdide, on the planet Devil's Ball. Jaffar's passengers, Prince Matton and his sister, Princess Belle, have been deposed from their planet and are transporting the treasure the Prince took along to fund his restoration. Matton is upset at being diverted.

On Devil's Ball, Jaffar, Silbad, Matton and Belle begin communicating with Piel to give him advice. They witness the metamorphosis of a water lily-like organism that blossoms and releases a cluster of sentient, psychic "gnomes", two of whom, Yula and Jad, stow away on Jaffar's ship seeking adventure and explore the ship, toying with the Prince's treasure. Matton nearly convinces Piel to drown himself in a lake, but is discovered by Belle. She stuns Matton with a ray gun and guides Piel to safety. It is strongly implied that Belle recommends ejecting the treasure via the airlock (presumably over ejecting Matton himself), in order to deprive Matton of his motivation for harming Piel. Yula and Jad undertake the jettisoning of the treasure.

Confined to the brig, Matton rages and threatens murder if he is not released. Yula and Jad find his raging unbearable, and conspire to help Matton escape with the expectation that he will flee to the nearby Gamma 10 and be done away with by a hostile entity which resides there.

From the bridge, the others are alerted to Matton's escape in the ship's stolen shuttlecraft, and Jaffar gives chase in an emergency capsule. On the surface of Gamma 10, Matton encounters a horde of visually identical beings that resemble faceless angels. The beings capture Matton and Jaffar and imprison them. Yula and Jad, who stowed away in the emergency capsule, slip into Jaffar's cell and warn him that the hostile entity is a being of pure thought which mentally dominates other lifeforms, causing them to lose all sense of individuality and become its puppets, the angels. They attempt to free Jaffar, but are unable to before his captors return, and tell Jaffar that he and Matton can avoid being assimilated by resisting and exuding all the hate and contempt they can muster, though the act will likely destroy both the entity and them with it. Jaffar insists that he would rather die than live on as a slave.

In a ritualistic ceremony, the angels bring Matton and Jaffar before the entity. Matton proposes they fight the angels together and trying to defeat at least some before being overwhelmed. Jaffar reveals that the true enemy is the entity, and tells him of the fatal method to fight and resist it. Matton, melancholic over his own worth, seems to find resolve. When they approach the entity, Matton shoves Jaffar aside, pleading for him to look after Belle before sacrificing himself in an apparent gesture of atonement. Perhaps uniquely suited to self-loathing, Matton successfully 'opposes unity', destroying the entity and himself. Freed of the entity's influence, the angels revert to their original selves, a varied group of spacefarers, both humans and other species. The stronghold of the entity collapses and explodes, and Matton is last observed by Jaffar to be writhing in agony, ensnared in flaming tentacles.

Yula and Jad, directed by Jaffar to return the shuttle to the ship, are able to rescue Jaffar and the former captives from the collapsing stronghold and take them all onboard. Meanwhile, Piel befriends a local creature, a hippornithorhynchus, which accompanies him. A Interplanetary Reform Patrol Fleet cruiser catches up with Jaffar's ship, pursuing the royals and the treasure Matton stole. Jaffar suggests the rescued spacefarers hijack the Reform cruiser for themselves. During the strategy meeting, one of the rescued from Gamma 10, Onyx the Digeed of Gnaz, is revealed to be able to change his shape to resemble any object. Onyx will impersonate the missing treasure, allowing the spacefarers to get onto the Reformist ship.

Jaffar's vessel is boarded, and while he presents the "captured" pirates and the fake treasure to the Reform commander, no one can converse with Piel, who begins to wander without supervision. Jaffar's crew later attempt to contact Piel, who has lost his transceiver and the hippornithorhynchus inside a cave filled with predatory tentacles. Despondent, Piel wanders back to the lakeside, which takes him out of the safety of the forest, and is attacked by the hornets which caused the death of his parents. Jaffar's ship closes on her destination, but the planet is being transported through time by a race of aliens known as the Masters of Time. Perdide and everything on it, including Piel, is sent back 60 years through time.

The effect of time travel renders the unprotected crew of Jaffar's ship unconscious. They awake in a space station, where they have been treated, but Silbad is dying. Yula and Jad telepathically discover that Silbad is actually a now-elderly Piel. At the time Perdide was displaced, Piel was nearly killed by the hornets before a passing spacefarer named Igor, who was investigating the recently appeared planet, came to his rescue. However, due to his trauma, Piel lost his childhood memories. Shortly after this revelation, Silbad dies. His funeral is attended by a Master of Time.

== Differences from the novel ==
The motion picture story is based on the novel L'Orphelin de Perdide (1958) by the French writer Stefan Wul.

In the original novel, the character of Piel was also named Claude, like his father. Laloux changed this to distinguish father and son.

== Cast ==
Character	Original	English
Jaffar	Jean Valmon	Unknown

=== Original ===
- Silbad - Michel Elias
- Piel - Frédéric Legros
- Matton - Yves-Marie
- Belle - Monique Thierry
- Claude - Sady Rebbot
- Jad - Patrick Baujin
- Yula - Pierre Tourneur
- Xul - Alain Cuny
- Général - Yves Brainville
- Igor - Michel Barbey

=== English ===
- Ray Brooks

== Production ==
The BBC (who were co-producers) aired an English-language dubbed version in 1987 called Time Masters, featuring, amongst others, the voice of Ray Brooks.

Directed by René Laloux, the film was produced largely at the Pannonia Film Studio in Hungary. The visual design was based on the art of Mœbius, otherwise known as Jean Giraud.

== Reception ==
On the review aggregator website Rotten Tomatoes, 100% of 5 critics' reviews are positive.

== Home media ==
Several versions have been released on DVD:

- A French edition (ASIN: B00017O6KM, two-disc collectors edition) which was released in 2004 and has no English subtitles.
- A German edition (ASIN: B004C5L4X6, single-disc edition) released on 11 November 2010 and another German edition (ASIN: B001I9ZML4, single-disc edition) released on 3 November 2008.
- The out-of-print single-disc edition released in the US in 2000 (ASIN: B00004S8A2) is in French with English subtitles.
- UK distributor Eureka! released a restored, wide-screen and English-subtitled version of the film as part of its Masters of Cinema series on 22 October 2007.
- The now-defunct Russian Cinema Council (abbreviated to RusCiCo) released a single-disc edition on 18 July 2005, featuring the original French track and two Russian-translated audio tracks (one being the theatrical dub and the other a voice-over), as well as Russian subtitles. It was later included in the set Фантастические миры Рене Лалу (The Fantastic Worlds of Rene Laloux), and a stripped down version would also be released, only featuring Russian audio.
- A Korean DVD with French audio and English and Korean subtitles.

== See also ==
- Causal loop
- Lists of animated feature films
