= Goulash Communism =

1956–1989 variety of communism in Hungary

Goulash Communism (Hungarian: gulyáskommunizmus), also known as refrigerator communism (Hungarian: fridzsiderkommunizmus), Kádárism or the Hungarian Thaw, is the variety of state socialism in the Hungarian People's Republic following the Hungarian Revolution of 1956. During János Kádár's period of leadership, the Hungarian People's Republic implemented policies with the goal of creating a high standard of living for the people of Hungary, coupled with economic reforms. These reforms fostered a sense of well-being and relative cultural freedom in Hungary, giving it the reputation of being "the happiest barracks" of the Eastern Bloc during the 1960s to the 1970s. With elements of regulated market economics as well as an improved human rights record, it represented a quiet reform and deviation from the Stalinist principles applied to Hungary in the previous decade.

The name is a metaphor derived from goulash, a traditional Hungarian dish. Goulash is made with an assortment of dissimilar ingredients; here, it represents how Hungarian communism became a mixed ideology, no longer strictly adhering to the Marxist–Leninist interpretations of the prior decade. Nikita Khrushchev was the first to use the term when he wanted to highlight Hungary's economic developments. This period of "pseudo-consumerism" saw an increase of consumption of consumer goods as well. During the Kádár era, Hungary became the most consumption-oriented country of the Eastern Bloc, with the highest standard of living.

The phrase "the happiest barracks" was coined in the 1970s to describe the socialist state during this period, though it was also used to describe Poland. The word "happiest" referred to the Hungarian People's Republic having the highest standard of living of all the Soviet-bloc countries. It was the easiest place to travel abroad and the quickest to get access to Western products and culture. The country, however, remained under firm party control.

== Origins ==
The flag used for the Hungarian Revolution of 1956

=== Hungarian Revolution of 1956 ===
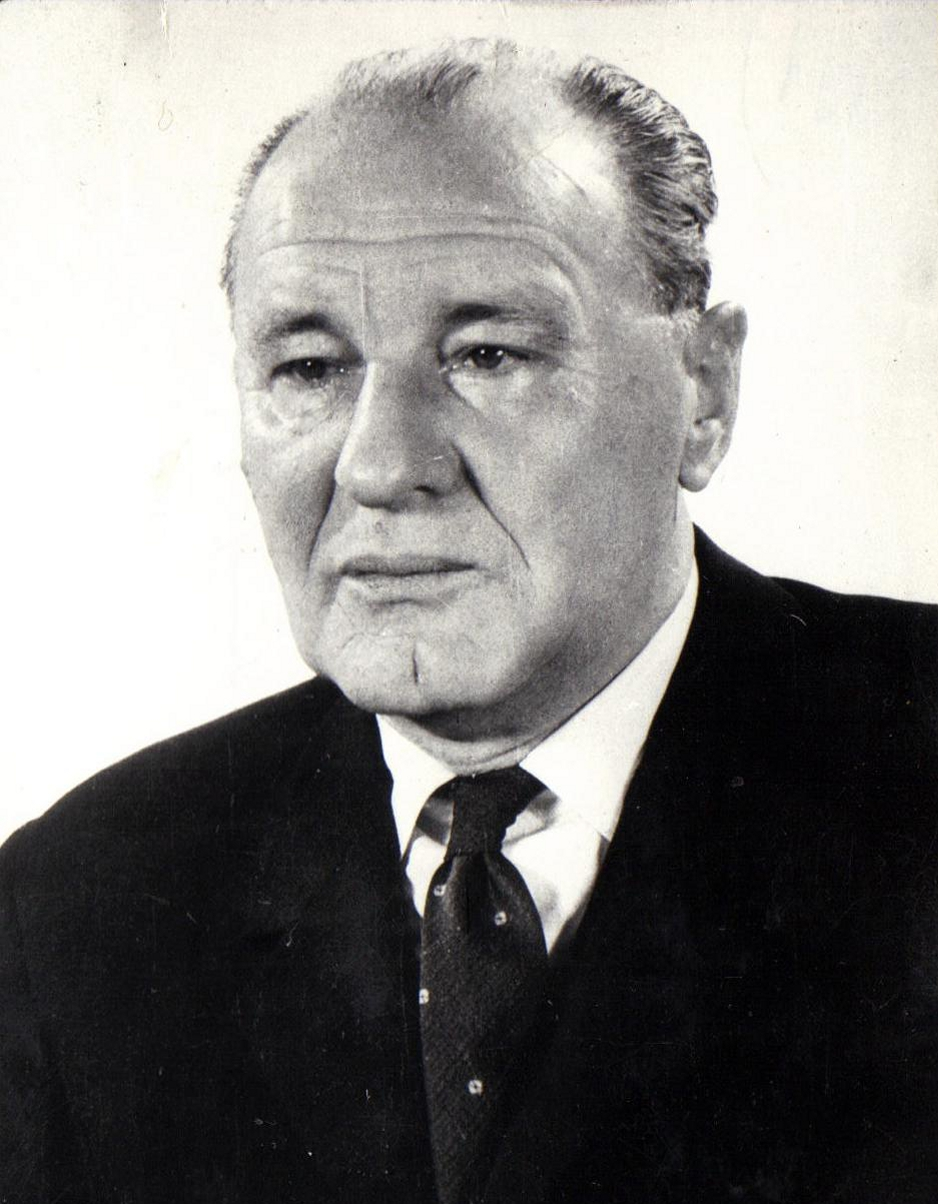
János Kádár was the General Secretary of the Hungarian Socialist Workers' Party from 1956 to 1988.

The historical events leading to and including the Hungarian Revolution of 1956 created an atmosphere for Goulash Communism to commence. Mátyás Rákosi headed the Hungarian Working People's Party (MDP) until shortly before its demise in the 1956 revolution, modelling Hungarian Communism after the regime of Joseph Stalin in the Soviet Union. In that sense, he helped implement an extensive industrialization of the country. While the quick change to industry brought an initial surge in the economy, it ultimately left many people with worse living conditions. In 1951, the Hungarian people had to use a ticket system to purchase basic supplies. After the death of Stalin in 1953, the Soviet Union supported a change in leadership in Hungary and recommended Imre Nagy for the position of Prime Minister. Nagy took steps in his government towards "political liberalization", which drove Rákosi, a staunch Stalinist, to oust him from office in 1955. Imre Nagy did come back and lead the government during the 1956 revolt. During the months of October and November 1956 the people of Hungary revolted against the political and economic situation that was imposed upon them. The Soviet Union reacted with military force and extinguished the uprising, while also changing the command of the state to János Kádár as general secretary in 1956.

=== János Kádár ===
János Kádár joined the Hungarian Communist Party while it was still illegal in 1931. He was arrested for conspiracy shortly after. A decade later, he rejoined the party in 1941 but went into hiding until the end of World War II, when Hungary was turned communist after the occupation of the Soviet Red Army, and the "blue-ballot" elections. He started openly practicing communism and worked throughout Hungary's new communist government until he was arrested for the third time for allegedly being a "secret agent" against the party. After Stalin's death, Imre Nagy released many people from prison, Kádár among them. He was released and rehabilitated. He became popular due to being a victim of Stalin's purges, proof that he stood against the former Rákosi administration. In July 1956 he was elected to the Hungarian Politburo. During the revolution, on October 25, 1956, he was elected to the position of first secretary of the MDP. Six days later, the MDP was reorganized as the Hungarian Socialist Workers' Party (MSZMP), with Kádár as its first leader. The Politburo of the Communist Party of the Soviet Union then summoned him to Moscow, where he was nominated to be the new leader of Hungary. He had major influence in the political affairs of the country until 1988.

== Ideology ==
Goulash Communism showed a far greater concern for public opinion and an increased focus on the present well-being of the citizens than had been the case in the period preceding 1956. It provided a wider latitude for dissent than was the case in the rest of the Soviet bloc; Kádár regularly said, "Who is not against us is with us." This modified the role of the Communist Party in the development of socialism, now interpreted as "serving" rather than "commanding", reduced the formality of relations between the party and the populace at large, increased the scope of societal self-expression and self-management, and refined the guiding Marxist–Leninist ideology with modified means of dissemination. In his 1956 manifesto "Reform Communism", Imre Nagy invokes Marxist–Leninist ideology in the desire to reform. He argues that Marxism is a "science that cannot remain static but must develop and become more perfect".

He credits Karl Marx with having created a method, meant to guide socialism and its development but not to encompass them in full. "The theory of Marx – as Lenin stated – gives general guiding principles, which must be utilized in Britain in another fashion than in France, in France differently than in Germany, and in Germany differently than in Russia." Successive Soviet leaderships rejected this interpretation, Nikita Khrushchev's response to Hungary in 1956 and Leonid Brezhnev's to Czechoslovakia in 1968 and the resulting Brezhnev Doctrine stating that though "each socialist country had the right to determine the concrete form of its development along the path of socialism by taking account of the specific nature of their national conditions... the Soviet Union would not tolerate deviation from the principles of socialism and the restoration of capitalism".

In 1962, six years after the Hungarian Revolution of 1956, the 8th Congress of the Hungarian Socialist Workers' Party declared the period of "consolidation of socialism" after 1956 to be over and that the "foundations for the establishment of a socialist society" had been achieved, which enabled a general amnesty for most people sentenced in connection with 1956. Under Kádár, the party gradually curbed some of the excesses of the secret police (the Ministry of Internal Affairs III replaced the State Protection Authority, for example) and repealed most of the restrictions on expression and movement enacted under Rákosi. In their place, the party introduced a relatively liberal cultural and economic course aimed at overcoming the post-1956 hostility toward the Kádár government. In 1966, the Central Committee approved the "New Economic Mechanism" which eased foreign trade restrictions, gave limited freedom to the workings of the market, and allowed a few small businesses to operate in the services sector. Though liberal in comparison to Soviet socialism, the first relaxation of economic control was far from posing the same threat as the 1956 reforms. Official policy employed different methods of administering the collectives, leaving the pace of mechanization up to each separately. Additionally, rather than enforcing the system of compulsory crop deliveries and of workdays credit, the collectivizers used monthly cash wages. Later in the 1960s, cooperatives were permitted to enter into related and then general auxiliary businesses such as food processing, light industry and service industry.

== Policy ==
=== Internal affairs ===
János Kádár came to power following Soviet military intervention. In the immediate aftermath, thousands of Hungarians were arrested. Eventually, 26,000 of these were brought before the Hungarian courts; 22,000 were sentenced and imprisoned, 13,000 interned, and 229 executed. Approximately 200,000 fled Hungary as refugees. Former Hungarian Foreign Minister Géza Jeszenszky estimated 350 were executed. Sporadic resistance and strikes by workers' councils continued until mid-1957, causing economic disruption. In the aftermath, Kádár made clear his break from the Rákosi government and sought to improve living conditions through reform.

In 1962, six years after the Hungarian Revolution, the 8th Congress of the Hungarian Socialist Workers' Party declared the general amnesty of revolutionaries imprisoned since 1956. By 1963, most political prisoners from the 1956 Hungarian Revolution had been released. In 1968, the Central Committee approved the New Economic Mechanism, an act to reform the economy of Hungary. It influenced businesses, letting them grow through horizontal integration instead of only vertical. In turn, businesses could source their raw materials and export excess product. The Act loosened central planning, giving businesses more say in their suppliers and economic decisions. The New Economic Mechanism achieved the goal of raising living standards throughout the state. Throughout the majority of the 1960s and 1970s, the people enjoyed more cultural freedoms and a reduction of ideological pressure from the state. Hungary's economic resources were mobilized to satisfy consumer demand more effectively by providing a more extensive assortment of consumer goods. Some economic reform measures were introduced to integrate limited market mechanisms into the framework of the Soviet-style economy. An unfortunate result of this policy was rising economic stresses and high indebtedness which became evident by the late 1980s.

Although there was no legal opposition, an illegal opposition group existed for about 20 years, the so-called Democratic Opposition, under close surveillance by the state apparatus. Its predecessor was the so-called Budapest School.

=== Foreign affairs ===
After the reconciliation of Hungary from the revolutionaries, János Kádár's government created a deal with the Soviet Union where they would control foreign affairs while Kádár could exercise domestic control. Through this compromise, the Soviet Union used Hungary as a rare opening between the communist East and the capitalist West. Hungary started trading and enacting transactions with the West. Much of the capital fueling the Goulash Communist period came from the West. Also fueling the reforms was an oil trade between Hungary and the Soviet Union. One main reason why Hungary could not keep Goulash Communism into the 1980s was the reliance on these foreign revenues. In the mid-1970s, an oil crisis hit Hungary (along with much of the rest of the world), forcing it to draw more loans from Western countries to pay the inflated oil prices. This oil crisis led to price increases of basic commodities across Hungary, and in turn, by 1985, the standard of living started decreasing for the first time since the introduction of Goulash Communism.

The increase in cultural freedoms, coupled with an increase in living standards and a relative openness to foreign affairs, led to an increase in the consumption of consumer goods throughout Hungary. People began buying television sets and personal cars and began to adopt a way of thinking based on increased consumption. Their demand was not easily met, and the phrase "Kicsi vagy kocsi" was used to express frustration (it means "[the choice between] a baby and a car"). Even so, there were influxes of socialist cars and other consumer items all across the state. In 1964, multiple foreign embassies opened in Budapest. As a result of being a comparatively well-off country in the Eastern bloc, Hungary was the destination for tourists from other communist nations for whom visits to the West were much more difficult.

== See also ==
- Hungary under the Kádár regime
- Barracks communism
- Khrushchev thaw
- Market socialism
- Polish October
- Titoism

General

- Eastern Bloc economies
- History of Hungary
