= Galaktika =

- Editor: Attila Németh
- Former editors: Péter Kuczka
- Categories: Science fiction magazine
- Frequency: Monthly
- Publisher: Metropolis Media Group Kft. István Burger
- First issue: 1972
- Country: Hungary
- Based in: Budapest
- Language: Hungarian
- Website: galaktika.hu
- ISSN: 0133-2430
- OCLC: 35111971

Galaktika is a Hungarian science fiction magazine. At its peak, 94,000 copies of the magazine were printed in Hungary. The publication originally ran from 1972 to 1995, before ceasing publication. It was revived and financed by Metropolis Media in 2004.

== Original Run ==
The magazine was divided into three sections: "Thematic", "National", and "Mixed". The first section concentrated on stories with similar themes, while the second selected works from the literature of a specific country. Péter Kuczka remained the editor during the lifetime of the original magazine. Galaktika's first edition was issued in the summer of 1972, with 38,000 copies printed on 125 A5 pages. In 1985, with issue #60, the format was changed to 96 A4 pages. But in 1993 it reverted to the A5 in a black-bordered format. The 1993 format persisted until the original publication ceased.

Galaktika closed in 1995. During its initial run, 2,257 short stories and articles written by more than 1,000 authors were published in Galaktika.

== Revival ==
Galaktika was revived by István Burger and managed by Metropolis Media in November 2004 with issue #176. The revival presented new page layouts, editorial structure, and ownership, but remained a publisher of science fiction.

In 2016 the magazine was accused of publishing works translated from English into Hungarian without payment or permission from the original authors. Several science fiction authors, including Terry Pratchett and George R. R. Martin indicated that their stories had been published without permission. Cat Rambo, president of the Science Fiction and Fantasy Writers Association, issued a statement criticizing the magazine and formally recommending that: "authors, editors, translators, and other publishing professionals avoid working with Galaktika until the magazine has demonstrated that existing issues have been addressed and that there will be no recurrence." In July 2017 the Authors Guild and the Science Fiction and Fantasy Writers Association reached a formal agreement with Metropolis Media to compensate affected authors and seek proper permissions for future publications.

== Awards ==
Organization	Award	Year	Notes	Ref.
European Science Fiction Society	Best Sci-Fi Magazine in Europe	1974		
European Science Fiction Society	Best Magazine	2005		
European Science Fiction Society	Best Translator	2011	Awarded to Attila Németh	
European Science Fiction Society	Best Promoter	2013	Awarded to István Burger	

== See also ==
- Hungarian science fiction
