= Monique Thierry =

French actress (1940–2021)

- Born: Monique Andrée Georgette Marie Le Bout de Château-Thierry de Beaumanoir; 26 March 1940; Saint-Thibéry, France
- Died: 30 July 2021 (aged 81)
- Occupation: Actress

Monique Thierry (26 March 1940 – 30 July 2021) was a French actress. She specialized in dubbing and was notably the French language voice of Wonder Woman in the 1970s TV series.

On television, Thierry rose to fame as Mariette in the television series The New Adventures of Vidocq. She was notably a voice actress in Who's the Boss?, Wonder Woman, and Roseanne.

Thierry married actor in Paris in 1960, with whom she had two children: Vincent and .

Monique Thierry died on 30 July 2021 at the age of 81.

== Theatre ==
- L'Île des esclaves (1963)
- The Shrewd Widow (1979)

== Filmography ==
- (1961)
- (1971)
- The New Adventures of Vidocq (1971)
- (1976)
