= Péter Kuczka =

Hungarian writer and poet

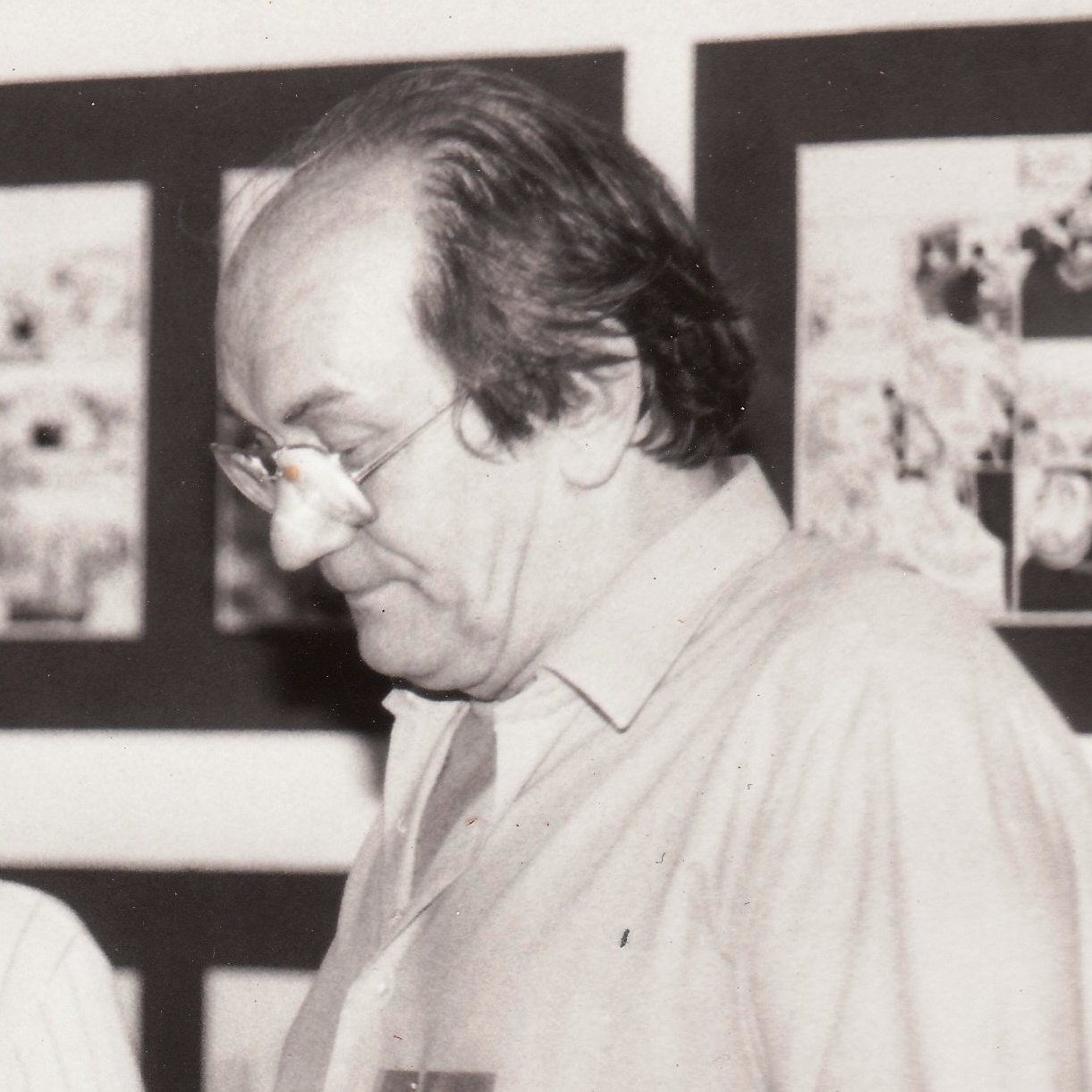
Kuczka in 1986

Péter Kuczka (Székesfehérvár, Hungary, 1 March 1923 – Budapest, Hungary, 8 December 1999) was a Hungarian writer, poet and science fiction editor. He was also active as a comic writer.

After finishing high school, Kuczka studied at the University of Economy in Hungary while working several jobs. He started writing after the end of World War II and from 1940 was influential in Hungarian literature circles.

Kuczka's poetry was first printed in 1949 but after 1956 he was not allowed to publish his poetry due to his political views and local political changes. He got national prizes for his early literature in 1950 (József Attila prize) and 1954 (Kossuth Prize).

He was the editor of the Kozmosz Fantasztikus Könyvek (Cosmos Fantastic Books) series, whose books were the first science fiction books in Hungary.

He was the founder and editor of Galaktika, the third largest science fiction anthology in the world, which had a definitive influence on the evolution of Hungarian science fiction literature. He regarded science fiction as a "high literary" genre. Consequently, he sought to present the humanistic, philosophical currents of science fiction to Hungarian readers. He did not consider science fiction being an Anglo-American dominated genre; he strove to present works by writers of various nationalities. As a result, the science fiction literature that was published in Hungary at the time was diverse, both in terms of content and style. He introduced Hungarian readers the works of Jorge Luis Borges.

He was the editor of the publisher Móra Ferenc könyvkiadó from 1976. Móra Ferenc könyvkiadó is aims to help the literary education of Hungarian children.

== Criticism ==
After World War II, Kuczka became a mouthpiece of the Communist Rákosi regime, as he put it, on a voluntary basis. He became a significant figure in contemporary Hungarian literature and culture dominated by the Communists. He became a close confidant of the Minister of Culture, József Révai, much so that in 1949 Révai forbade Magda Szabó to receive the Baumgarten Prize, which had already been awarded, and Kuczka was given the prize instead. His poems were militant, direct, raw, often prose-wise, agitative poetry. As he wrote later: "I believed in Communism, I felt and knew more and more, I wanted to be a writer for the Party, serving the set goals. I had no doubt that with the full mastery and experience of Marxism-Leninism we could arrive at socialist realism, considered to be the pinnacle of literature. I believed in our results, our successes, because I worked for them and felt them. I accepted it because I considered it necessary to have a rhythmic applause, to glorify Stalin and Rákosi, I believed in the escalation of the class struggle, the Rajk trial. I accepted a simplified and thus more understandable and transparent world, the complexity of reality was obviously alarming, I saw the history of mankind as a kind of “long march” towards communism. I have suppressed my doubts, either discarded my previous views, opinions, knowledge, or incorporated them into my new worldview."

Science fiction writer István Nemere described Kuczka as being the state-installed overlord of Hungarian science fiction during the Kádár-era, and that writers who were not sympathetic to him could simply not get their works in print. Nemere accused him of setting throwbacks to his career in the early 1980s. It is an interesting parallel that the man dominant in American science fiction publishing in the 1950s, John W. Campbell, Jr. also came into conflict with writers.

Translator and current Galaktika editor Attila Németh told that Kuczka hated the Star Trek franchise (probably because he considered it "pulp science fiction" which he despised), and that's why it was almost completely neglected in Hungary during the Socialist era. Németh, a Star Trek fan later translated Trek novels to Hungarian, and served as translator and consultant on the Hungarian dubbed version of the Star Trek series and movies. However Németh also said that under Communism, with strict censorship, critical messages could sometimes slip through the cracks in science fiction literature, because the plot, set in distant times on distant planets, did not seem as realistic as if it had been set in the real world, like in contemporary Socialist Hungary.
