= 1961 in science fiction =

The year 1961 was marked, in science fiction, by the following events.

== Events ==
- The 19th annual Worldcon, Seacon, is held in Seattle, USA

=== Births ===
- Neal Asher
- Greg Egan

=== Deaths ===
- Clark Ashton Smith

== Literary Releases ==
=== Novels ===
- The Primal Urge by Brian Aldiss
- Solaris by Stanislaw Lem
- Stranger in a Strange Land by Robert A. Heinlein

=== Comics ===
- Fantastic Four #1 by Stan Lee and Jack Kirby

== Television ==
- A for Andromeda

== Awards ==
- A Canticle for Liebowitz by Walter M. Miller, Jr. won the Hugo Award for Best Novel
- The Longest Voyage by Poul Anderson won the Hugo Award for Best Short Story
- The Twilight Zone won the Hugo Award for Best Dramatic Presentation
