= Hungary under the Kádár regime =

Era in Hungarian history

The period of Hungary from 1956 to 1989, also known as the Kádár era or Kádár regime, was a period of the communist Hungarian People's Republic. The name Kádár era was named after János Kádár, who was chosen by the Soviets to be the leader of the Hungarian Socialist Workers' Party (MSZMP) and led the country until May 1988. During his period of leadership, the Hungarian People's Republic implemented policies with the goal to create a high standard of living for the people of Hungary coupled with economic reforms. These reforms fostered a sense of well-being and relative cultural freedom in Hungary, giving it the reputation of being "the happiest barracks" of the Eastern Bloc during the 1960s to the 1970s. With elements of regulated market economics as well as an improved human rights record, it represented a quiet reform and deviation from the Stalinist principles applied to Hungary in the previous decade. During the Kádár era, Hungary became the most consumption-oriented country of the Eastern Bloc, with the highest standard of living. The word "happiest" referred to the Hungarian People's Republic having the highest standard of living of all the Soviet-bloc countries. It was the easiest place to travel abroad and the quickest to get access to Western products and culture. The country, however, remained under firm party control.

== Early tenure of János Kádár (1956–1963) ==
At the same time as the 1956 revolution was crushed by the Soviets, János Kádár was appointed Hungarian Communist Party leader and Prime Minister in Moscow (although Ferenc Münnich was also a candidate). During the Kádár reprisals, over three years, about 400 people were executed for participating in the revolution, more than 21,668 people were imprisoned, and 16-18 thousand people were interned (some transported to the USSR). Former Hungarian Foreign Minister Géza Jeszenszky estimated 350 were executed. Sporadic resistance and strikes by workers' councils continued until mid-1957, causing economic disruption. In the aftermath, Kádár made clear his break from the Rákosi government and sought to improve living conditions through reform. The institutional system of the communist dictatorship established between 1948 and 1950 under the leadership of the Hungarian Working People's Party (MDP) was restored. At the same time, the new government also tried to keep in check the Stalinist opponents within the communist party, which was reorganized under the name of the Hungarian Socialist Workers' Party (MSZMP), and was organized for the construction of power. Mátyás Rákosi (who ruled as the de facto leader of Hungary from 1947 until 1956), Ernő Gerő, and their hard-line comrades were permanently expelled from the party in 1962. One of the main political goals of the strengthened dictatorship remained the most organized control of the citizens. However, terror was essentially only used selectively from the turn of 1956/57. In the easing confrontation of the Cold War, the policy and position of the UN and Western Europe on the so-called "Hungarian question" made it clear that there was no return to the pre-1956 policy. The legitimacy of Kádár (and thus the entire country) was tied to Hungary's accession to the UN by the Western powers, while the UN, in turn, condemned the system in its position paper and included the "Hungarian question" on its agenda until the Kádár compromise. As one of the main factors of the unpopularity of the pre-revolutionary regime, the State Protection Authority (ÁVH) was not reorganized, but its former members had the opportunity to apply for new bodies, such as the reorganized police or workers' guard, or investigative departments in its aftermath.

Many of them took advantage of this opportunity. Under the terms of the compromise, Kádár declared a general amnesty for those convicted of 1956. (Note: Due to this, in 1960 and again on March 15, 1963, about 80% of those imprisoned were released.) In return, Hungary was accepted internationally, was allowed to delegate and receive ambassadors, and in exchange for greater personal freedom and career opportunities, could maintain strict limits on political activity, thus removing the Hungarian question from the UN table. 3,000 political prisoners were released, but not all, because many were sentenced under criminal law. On May 1, 1957, barely half a year after the suppression of the revolution, a crowd of several hundred thousand people participated in the official ceremony and May Day parade in Heroes' Square, and this was presented as an expression of sympathy for Kádár. In reality, it was the feeling of intimidation in the aftermath of the Soviets' suppression of the Hungarian revolution, and the scale of the crowd (thousands) proved to be an advantageous tool for the regime to show its popularity.

The reconstruction and consolidation of the economy, which had collapsed and was already outdated during the revolution, was supported by the CSTO, the Soviet Union, Romania, and China with loans, commodity credits, and aid. The Soviets transferred the largest sums, but they almost completely dictated the methods of using the credit lines. By 1961, forced collectivization had ended, during which peasants were often forced to hand over their lands to the production cooperatives by administrative means, blackmail, and beatings. As a result, 90% of the land came into the hands of state-owned farms and cooperative farms (kolhoz). The system of delivery was abolished and food supplies became secure. By 1963, electricity had reached every settlement or village. More attention was paid to light (clothes etc.) and food industries, but the wasteful, over-regulated and bureaucratic system of planned economy and distorted industrial structure remained. Infrastructure continued to be neglected.

== Apex of the Kádár era (1963–1979) ==
The Stalinist party leadership had become completely authoritarian and was replaced by 1963, with the new leadership no longer striving for total dictatorship or complete control of the people. Stalinist cadres were sent to lower positions. The methods were refined, and the repression became indirect. Kádár proclaimed the policy of "whoever is not against us is with us". (Note: Based on Tibor Méray's article titled "Csodatevók avagy egyszerű emberek írása", published in the foreign opposition newspaper Irodalmi Újság on October 23, 1961, where the writer wrote this as an opinion on the current situation on the occasion of the fifth anniversary of the 1956 revolution. It is not known how Kádár obtained access to the foreign newspaper, which was banned in Hungary, but it clearly inspired him to make the ominous statement a month later on December 8, at the congress of the Patriotic People's Front, which was then attributed to him. Rákosi used to say: "Who is not with us, is against us!", which was the sign of totalitarianism.) In Hungary, it was no longer obligatory to believe in the system, but it was still forbidden to act against it whether in words or in any other form. During the period of the soft dictatorship of the party-state, Hungary was often called the "happiest barracks" of the socialist camp in the Western press, in comparison with the harsher dictatorships of other socialist countries, but it was also called "Goulash Communism" and "refrigerator communism", referring to the more livable conditions of the era. Since the party leadership made decisions without their participation, the people turned away from politics. Some intellectuals mixed the whole Kádár era with Goulash Communism, but neither before 1963 nor after 1980 were the same living standards of regular people for the Communist Party important like between the years of 1963 to 1980. Some issues were considered taboo in the controlled publicity of the system, which was full of contradictions: it was forbidden to question the legitimacy and ideological foundations of the system. For example, the fact of the Soviet occupation, the necessity of the proletarian dictatorship, the fact of hidden unemployment inside the factory gates due to full employment, the hard-line Kádárist assessment of 1956, the person of János Kádár, the continued existence of poverty, which although reduced by the 1980s due to the extensive social welfare system, remained. In addition, however, most topics in the party-controlled press were practically debatable by the intelligentsia. On the other hand, the secret service surveillance of the population expanded, and the network of informants grew, although it never reached the level of the GDR.

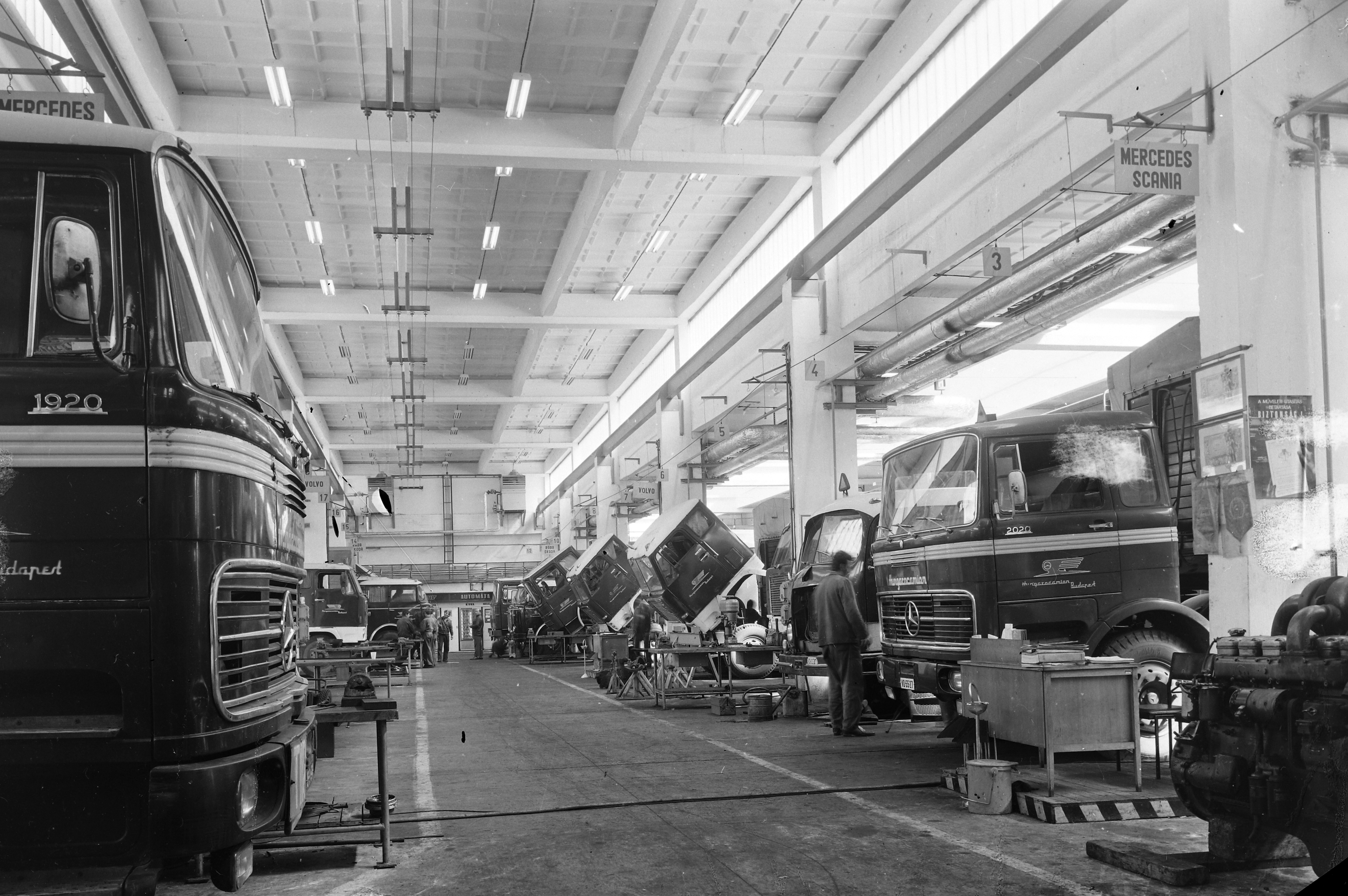
Cinkotai Street, Budapest, in 1971

The Kádár regime was characterized by Goulash Communism, because everyday satisfaction was considered a strategic issue due to 1956, and therefore they tried to increase the standard of living at any cost, even in an unsustainable way. A multitude of resorts and hotels were built, and the possibility of vacationing became widespread. Foreign (even Western) travel was permitted to a limited extent: such an application could be submitted every three years, which the authorities either approved or rejected. Transport and telecommunications began to develop, albeit slowly. In addition, subsidized private houses (the Kádár cube, which defined the appearance of smaller settlements, became widespread at that time), began to appear and were constructed between the 1960s and the 1980s.

Throughout the majority of the 1960s and 1970s the people enjoyed more cultural freedoms and a reduction of ideological pressure from the state. Hungary's economic resources were mobilized to satisfy consumer demand more effectively by providing a more extensive assortment of consumer goods. Some economic reform measures were introduced to integrate limited market mechanisms into the framework of the Soviet-style economy. An unfortunate result of this policy were rising economic stresses and high indebtedness which became evident by the late 1980s.

Hospitals and clinics were built, from 1975 (until 1998) the population became citizens and the rate of participation in social insurance reached 100% (primarily the rural, agricultural population was included in the system), health indicators improved. Durable consumer goods were available. Dozens of educational institutions were built and the level of education improved. During this period, the population began to develop a consumerist petty bourgeoisie (weekend plots, cars, permanent homes, branded Western products), which was also helped by the technological achievements of the third industrial revolution. By legitimizing consumption and side jobs (which were forbidden in many other socialist countries), anyone could (in theory) buy or apply for a telephone, refrigerator, television, car, summer house, and other goods that significantly improved the individual's sense of comfort, which made the system itself more bearable. The previous forced puritanism was replaced by consumer mass culture, and the principle of equality was replaced by the importance of personal existence.

Ideological intrusion into the average citizen's lives was low, and due to the development and better life prospects, Kádár himself was also better regarded, his role in the suppression of the revolution was no longer much discussed, and over time he became a kind of paternal leader in the eyes of the people.

== Decline and fall (1979–1989) ==
As economic problems intensified (indebtedness, increasing dependence on Western imports), the communist leadership's sense of insecurity grew, because the great lesson of the 1956 revolution was considered that the standard of living should not be lowered. In the 1980s, as a result of the re-imposed unmodern industrialization (primarily in the energy sector instead of heavy industry), increasingly large sums were withdrawn from agriculture, infrastructure development was neglected compared to the previous decade, and the development of transport and communications decreased. Due to price subsidies and the decline in real wages, inflation began to increase. In order to alleviate the negative effects of the depleted state sector and the deficit economy, the private sector and the second economy were allowed to play an increasingly important role, with the exception of the period between 1968 and 1971, which was tolerated. The government remained subordinate to the party, and the parliament was a mere formality until the first free elections. The first opposition groups appeared after 1979, and reform initiatives were launched within the ruling MSZMP. The democratic opposition slowly developed, and its two major branches, the popular (national, rural-centric) and the urban (urban, liberal).

In 1981, the opposition press was founded, in the form of the samizdat, or illegally published magazine Beszélő. This was later followed by several new newspapers (Hírmondó 1984, Demokrata 1986, Hitel 1989). The policy of the new Soviet party secretary Gorbachev from 1985 opened the way towards a peaceful regime change. The Hungarian government and the World Bank signed the "Industrial Restructuring Loan" (ISAL) agreement on July 1, 1988, within the framework of which, among other things, the Companies Act and other related laws were enacted and adopted. This made it possible for state-owned companies to become joint-stock companies, for natural persons to purchase voting shares, and for natural persons to establish limited liability companies and joint-stock companies. Corporate income taxation was transformed, and the amount of subsidies for the iron industry and coal mining, producer and consumer prices was significantly reduced (although not by the promised 10%). VAT and personal income tax (PIT) were introduced, as well as a "world passport" valid for all countries of the world as a citizen's right. As a precursor to economic change, joint ventures were established with the involvement of wealthy Western companies. Unregulated (spontaneous) privatization began. In addition to the downsizing of loss-making sectors of the energy sector, large state-owned companies producing for the markets of Eastern European countries went bankrupt one after another as a result of the lack of orders. By the end of the decade, unemployment, which had been virtually unknown until then, appeared. Previously, this had been persecuted under the title of socially dangerous evasion of work.

Although Hungary had achieved some lasting economic reforms and limited political liberalization during the 1980s, major reforms only occurred following the replacement of János Kádár as General Secretary of the Communist Party (MSZMP) on 22 May 1988. That same year, the Parliament adopted a "democracy package", which included trade union pluralism; freedom of association, assembly, and the press; a new electoral law; and a radical revision of the constitution, among others.

Imre Nagy, whom communists had executed decades ago, was politically rehabilitated and his remains reburied on the 31st anniversary of his execution in the same plot after a funeral organized by, among others, opponents of the country's communist regime. Over 100,000 people are estimated to have attended Nagy's reinterment.

The Pan-European Picnic was a peace demonstration held on the Austrian-Hungarian border near the town of Sopron on 19 August 1989, an important event in political developments which led to the fall of the Iron Curtain and the reunification of Germany. Prime Minister Miklós Németh decided that his government could not afford to maintain automated border control along the border with Austria; spare parts would come from the West and were paid for in hard currency. Németh believed it was no longer necessary to secure the borders; Hungarians were allowed to travel freely, and the government did not intend to continue fortifying the country's western borders. On 27 June Austrian Foreign Minister Alois Mock and his Hungarian counterpart, Gyula Horn, cut the border fence in a symbolic ceremony highlighting Hungary's decision to dismantle its border surveillance, which had begun on 2 May.

In October 1989, the MSZMP convened its last congress and re-established itself as the Hungarian Socialist Party. In a historic session from 16 October to 20 October, the parliament adopted a package of nearly 100 constitutional amendments providing for multi-party parliamentary elections and a direct presidential election. The legislation transformed Hungary from a People's Republic into the Republic of Hungary, guaranteed human and civil rights, and created an institutional structure that ensured separation of powers among the judicial, legislative, and executive branches of government. On 23 October 1989 at Kossuth tér, Budapest, the Republic of Hungary was proclaimed for Mátyás Szűrös, provisional President, from balcony of Hungarian Parliament Building.

== See also ==
- Goulash Communism
