= Niourk =

1957 novel by Stefan Wul

First edition Cover art by René Brantonne

Niourk (published 1957) is a science fiction novel by the French writer Stefan Wul. It first appeared as one of the Fleuve Noir Anticipation collection published in France since 1951 which reflected the authors' attitudes towards the supposed post war rise of a "technocracy" in the country.

== Plot ==
The name of the novel, "Niourk", comes from the pronunciation of the name of New York City, and the book presents a future in which Earth is deserted and only small bands of hunter-gatherer tribes exist on a Paleolithic level.

"The Black Child" lives with his tribe on the dry bottom of the Caribbean Sea, where Cuba and Haiti are mountain ranges. Considered a mutant because of his skin colour, he is sentenced to death by the tribal shaman, and will be executed when the shaman has returned from his pilgrimage to the city of the gods. When the shaman does not come back, the child defies a taboo and follows the shaman's route into the ruins of an abandoned city. There, he finds pre-apocalyptic human artefacts, and picks up a laser rifle. The Black Child finds the frozen dead body of the shaman and, according to tribal custom, eats the shaman's brain and adds one of the shaman's vertebrae to the necklace of similar vertebrae that is the symbol of his power. By doing this, the Black Child becomes the tribal shaman. The child is attacked by a bear and defends himself with the laser weapon, but then, instead of killing it, tames the beast, which becomes his companion.

In the meantime, driven from their usual hunting grounds by a wildfire which has driven off all game, the tribe moves towards another hunting area, where they are attacked by intelligent, tentacled monsters mutated from octopuses by nuclear waste on the bottom of the now nearly dry Atlantic Ocean. The tribesmen kill one of the monsters and eat it, which makes them stronger, faster, and more intelligent. However, they also become heavily irradiated.

The Black Child returns to the tribe and saves them with the laser rifle from a larger monster attack. He then eats one of the monster's brains and begins to experience an exponential transformation of his intellect and abilities, but is also heavily irradiated.

As they travel, the tribe meet a human (whom they take to be a mad god) from a space-bound branch of mankind shipwrecked on earth. He directs them to New York before wandering off. On the trip there, all the tribesmen die from acute radiation sickness. New York is a futuristic city full of functional autonomous machinery. There, the Black Child meets two other humans from the shipwrecked crew. They heal the child, and in the process he develops tremendous intelligence, teaches himself to read, learns most of the human history, and develops superhuman powers. He is increasingly able to manipulate matter and space, which enables him to fly, go through walls, manipulate objects psycho-kinetically, and be in many places simultaneously. He creates a space ship and sends his three human companions home to Venus. Then he recreates them, plus all the members of his tribe, and relocates the Earth to the centre of the galaxy. The final sentences of the book also reveal that he has created a copy of himself to accompany the real humans home to Venus.

== Adaptations ==
A graphic novel adaptation by Olivier Vatine was published by Ankama Editions in 2012, and was translated into English by Dark Horse Comics in 2018.
