= Steve Terrell =

American actor

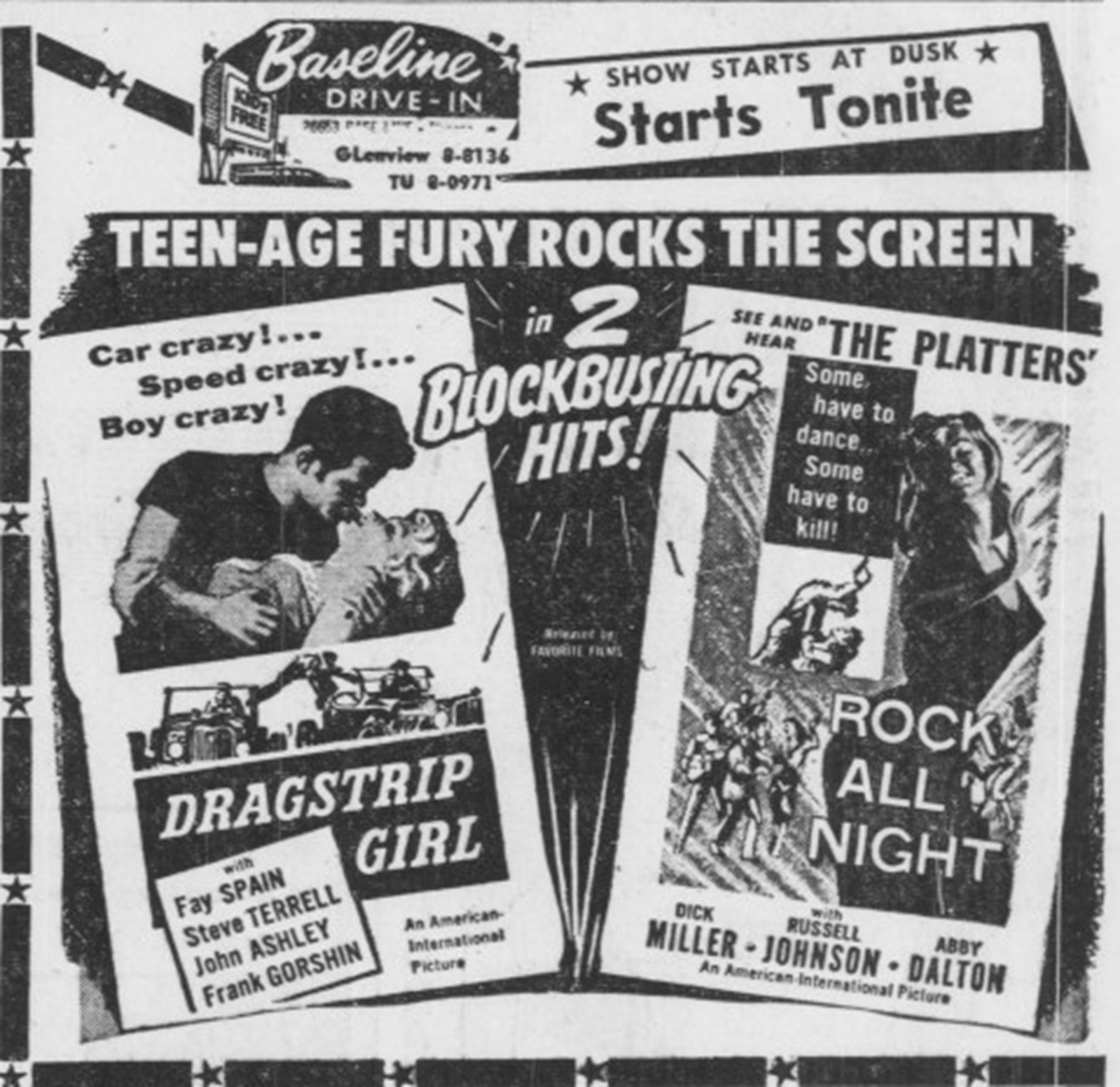
- Advertisement for Dragstrip Girl (1957) with Terrell
- Born: 1929 or 1930 (age 96–97); La Jolla, California, U.S.
- Education: Pasadena Playhouse School of Theater
- Occupation: Actor
- Years active: 1952–1965

Steven Terrell (born 1929 or 1930) is an American actor who worked extensively on American films and television series in the 1950s and 1960s. He is best known for his association with American International Pictures for whom he made Invasion of the Saucer Men and Runaway Daughters.

== Biography ==
Born in La Jolla, California, Terrell attended Burbank High School and the Pasadena Playhouse School of Theater.

He played Grove Nichols in the Perry Mason episode "The Case of the Blushing Pearls" and as Nick Lacy in the Ripcord episode "Willie". He also appeared as Warren Thomas White in the 1954 Dragnet episode "The Big Winchester".

Terrell and his wife Else Terrell later started a theatre troupe that came out of Minnesota and moved to San Diego in 1971 called "Lamb's Players Theatre" which still exists as of January 2022. This company has been in residence in Coronado, California as a regional theatre since 1994. Steve and Else left the company in 1981.

Also appeared in the TV series The Restless Gun appearing as the title role in the episode "The Nowhere Kid". In 1957 he portrayed “Billy Baxter” on the TV series Gunsmoke in “Who Lives By The Sword” (S2E34), and again in 1960 as “Jerry Everly” in “Jailbait Janet” (S5E25).
