= Pavel Shumil =

Russian science fiction author (born 1957)

Pavel Robertovitch Shumilov
- Born: July 22, 1957 (age 69); Leningrad
- Occupation: Author
- Writing career
- Pen name: Pavel Shumil
- Period: 1994-today
- Genre: Hard science fiction
- Website: dragonbase.narod.ru

Pavel Shumil (Па́вел Ро́бертович Шуми́лов) is a Russian science fiction author.

== Biography ==
Shumilov was born on 22 July 1957. In 1974 he entered the Electrotechnical Institute in Leningrad (ЛЭТИ), and graduated in 1980 as a computer engineer. He then worked in the research computing center of the Academy of Sciences in Leningrad (ЛНИВЦ АН СССР), where he operated computers of all classes as an operating engineer, application and system programmer, and systems analyst. His hobbies are cycling, boating, and FIDO.

Shumilov began writing in 1994. His first published work appeared in 1999 - The Word about a Dragon («Слово о драконе») series. Currently he lives in Saint-Petersburg, where he is an active member of the seminar of Boris Strugatsky.

== Bibliography ==
=== Printed books ===
1. The Word about a Dragon series
  1. Павел Шумилов. Одинокий дракон. Москва. Центрполиграф. 1999. 459 с.
    Contents:
    - Одинокий дракон (The Lone Dragon)
    - Последний Повелитель (The Last of the Sovereigns)
  2. Павел Шумилов. Дракон замка Конгов. Москва. Центрполиграф. 1999. 508 с.
    Contents:
    - Давно забытая планета (Long-forgotten Planet)
    - Дракон замка Конгов (Dragon of the Kongs' Castle)
  3. Павел Шумилов. Стать драконом. Москва. Центрполиграф. 1999. 491 с.
    Contents:
    - Стать драконом (To Become a Dragon)
    - Осколки Эдема (Shards of Eden)
  4. Павел Шумилов. Караван Мертвецов. Москва. Центpполигpаф. 1999. 489 с.
    Infringing publication.
    Contents
    - Иди, поймай свою звезду (Go and Catch a Falling Star)
    - Караван Мертвецов (Caravan of the Dead)
    - Адам и Ева — 2 (Adam and Eve II)
2. Separate publications
  1. «Полдень, XXI век» N5-2005 (19). One novel of Harsh Tales («Жестокие сказки») cycle
    Сказка N6. К вопросу о равенстве полов (Tale #6. On the matter of the equality of sexes).

=== Publications in digital form (freely distributed) ===
1. «Слово о драконе» (The Word about a Dragon) series.
  1. Слово о Драконе (The Word about a Dragon) (11.1994 − 03.1995)
  2. Последний Повелитель (The Last of the Sovereigns) (03.1995 − 05.1995)
  3. Давно забытая планета (Long-forgotten Planet) (16.07.1995 − 03.12.1995)
  4. Дракон замка Конгов (Dragon of the Kongs' Castle) (12.05.1996 − 03.11.1997)
  5. Стать Драконом (To Become a Dragon) (30.01.1996 − 08.04.1996)
  6. Осколки Эдема (Shards of Eden) (31.05.1996 − 03.11.1996)
  7. Иди, поймай свою звезду (Go and Catch a Falling Star) (31.05.1996 − 28.06.1997)
  8. К вопросу о смысле жизни (On the Matter of the Purport of Life) (25.01.1997 − 28.01.1997)
  9. Караван мертвецов (Caravan of the Dead) (02.02.1997 − 22.03.1997)
  10. Адам и Ева — 2 (Adam and Eve II) (12.03.1998 − 01.05.1998)
  11. Долг перед видом (Duty to One's Species) (12.03.1998 − 01.05.1998)
2. «Жестокие сказки» (Harsh Tales) collection.
  1. Сказка N1. Мастер-ломастер (Tale #1. The Crash-Master)
  2. Сказка N2. Любит — не любит (Tale #2. Loves Me - Loves Me Not)
  3. Сказка N3. К вопросу о природе семейного счастья (Tale #3. On the Matter of the Nature of Family Happiness)
  4. Сказка N4. Переведи меня через майдан (Tale #4. Lead Me Across the Square)
  5. Сказка N5. Кошкин дом (Tale #5. The Cat's House)
  6. Сказка N6. К вопросу о равенстве полов (Tale #6. On the Matter of the Equality of Sexes)
  7. Сказка N7. Должны любить (Tale #7. They Must Love)
  8. Сказка N8. Процент соответствия (Tale #8. Adequacy Percentage)
3. Separate publications.
  1. К вопросу о долгой жизни (On the Matter of Long Life) (20.08.2002 − 21.08.2002)
  2. Семь дней по лунному календарю (Seven Days, Moonwise) (17.09.1998 − 09.10.1998)
  3. К вопросу об охоте на драконов (On the Matter of Dragon Hunting) (07.04.2001 − 09.05.2001)
  4. Трюкач (Trickmaster) (20.02.2004)
  5. Эмбер. Чужая игра (Amber. The Strange Game) (08.05.1998 − 02.09.1998)

=== Translations ===
No professional translator has worked with Shumilov's writing. Only fan translations exist, on Shumilov's website.

1. English
  1. Loves me - loves me not... (2007)
  2. The Cat's House (2006)
  3. Trickmaster (2006)
2. Portuguese
  1. Me ajuda a atravessar maidan (Let me across a maidan) (2004)
  2. A Casa da Gata (The Cat's House) (2004)
  3. O Ajudante (Trickmaster) (2004)
