= Stefan Wul =

French writer

- Born: Pierre Pairault; 27 March 1922; Paris, France
- Died: 26 November 2003 (aged 81); Évreux, France
- Occupation: Author
- Writing career
- Notable works: Niourk; Oms en série L'Orphelin de Perdide

Stefan Wul was the nom de plume of the French science fiction writer Pierre Pairault (27 March 1922 – 26 November 2003), born in Paris.

== Biography ==
He was a dental surgeon, but science fiction was his real passion. Most of his books reflect that, showing a deep knowledge of scientific data. Pairault retired from dental surgery in 1989, but remained active in the French science fiction scene.

He published eleven novels between 1956 and 1959 (all published in the Fleuve Noir 'anticipation' imprint) and a twelfth in 1977. One of them, Le Temple du Passé (1957), was translated into English, as The Temple of the Past in 1973. His fame outside of French-speaking countries is due to the animated adaptations of two of his novels by the animator and film director René Laloux. Oms en série, which Laloux filmed in 1973, was translated into English in 2010 and published under the title Fantastic Planet.

== Bibliography ==
- Retour à zéro (Back to Zero, 1956)
- Niourk (1957)
- Rayons pour Sidar (Rays for Sidar, 1957)
- La Peur géante (The Giant Fear, 1957)
- Oms en série (Oms by the Dozen, 1957; filmed as La Planète sauvage in 1973)
- Le Temple du passé (The Temple of the Past, 1957)
- L'Orphelin de Perdide (The Orphan of Perdide, 1958; filmed as Les Maîtres du temps in 1982)
- La Mort vivante (The Living Death, 1958)
- Piège sur Zarkass (Trap on Zarkass, 1958)
- Terminus 1 (1959)
- Odyssée sous contrôle (Odyssey Under Control, 1959)
- Noô (1977)

== Honours ==
Stefan Wul received Prix Julia Verlanger in 1986 for his roman Noô.

Asteroid 213800 Stefanwul is named in his honor.
