= Fantastic Planet =

1973 animated film by René Laloux

- French release poster
- French: La Planète sauvage
- Directed by: René Laloux
- Written by: René Laloux; Roland Topor
- Based on: Oms en série by Stefan Wul
- Produced by: Simon Damiani; Anatole Dauman; Andre Valio-Cavaglione; Vaclav Strnad
- Narrated by: Jean Valmont
- Cinematography: Boris Baromykin; Lubomir Rejthar
- Edited by: Hélène Arnal; Marta Látalová
- Music by: Alain Goraguer
- Production companies: Les Films Armorial; Service de la recherche ORTF; Studio Jiri Trnka
- Distributed by: Argos Films (France); Ceskoslovensky Film Export (Czechoslovakia)
- Release dates: 11 May 1973 (Cannes); 6 December 1973 (France); 21 December 1973 (Czechoslovakia)
- Running time: 71 minutes
- Countries: France; Czechoslovakia
- Language: French
- Box office: $3.278

Fantastic Planet (French: La Planète Sauvage; Czech: Divoká planeta, lit. 'The Wild Planet') is a 1973 surrealist adult animated science fiction art film directed by René Laloux. Its allegorical story, about humans living on a strange planet dominated by giant humanoid aliens who consider them animals, is based on the 1957 novel Oms en série by the French writer Stefan Wul. The film was written by Laloux and Roland Topor; the latter also made the production design. It was a co-production between companies from France and Czechoslovakia and was animated at Jiří Trnka Studio in Prague.

A working title while in development was Sur la planète Ygam (On the Planet Ygam), which is where most of the story takes place; the actual title (The Fantastic/Savage Planet) is the name of Ygam's moon. Production began in 1963. Fantastic Planet was awarded the Grand Prix special jury prize at the 1973 Cannes Film Festival, and in 2016, it was ranked the 36th greatest animated movie ever by Rolling Stone.

== Plot summary ==
In the distant future, the giant blue humanoid Draags (Note: In French and Czech spelling: Draag.) have brought human beings (who are called Oms) (Note: This is a play on the French word for "man", homme.) from Earth to the planet Ygam, where the Draags maintain a technologically and spiritually advanced society. The Draags consider Oms animals, and while they keep some as pets, others live in the wilderness and are periodically slaughtered by the Draags to control their population. Draags have much longer lifespans than Oms, but reproduce much less.

When an Om woman is killed by three Draag children, her orphaned infant is found by Master Sinh, a key Draag leader, and his daughter Tiwa, who keeps the boy as a pet and names him Terr. Tiwa loves Terr and is careful not to hurt him, but, in accordance with her parents' instructions, gives him a collar with which she can pull him in any direction. She brings Terr to sessions in which she receives her education using a headset that transmits knowledge into her mind; a defect in Terr's collar allows him to receive the knowledge too. Around the time that Tiwa grows into her teens and first performs Draag meditation, which allows the species to travel with their minds, she loses some interest in Terr, who has become a young man and acquired much Draag knowledge. He escapes into the wilderness, stealing Tiwa's headset.

There he runs into a wild female Om, who cuts off his collar and introduces him to her tribe, which lives in an abandoned Draag park full of strange creatures and landscapes. Terr shows them how to use the headset to acquire Draag knowledge and literacy, winning the right to do so in a duel. The literacy they gain allows them to read a Draag announcement that the park will be purged of Oms, and, when the purge comes, some are slaughtered by Draag technology while others escape, joining forces with another tribe. They are attacked by two Draag passers-by and manage to kill one of them before escaping to an abandoned Draag rocket depot, much to the outrage of Draag leaders.

They live there for years, joined by many other Oms. Due to the knowledge acquired from Terr's headset, they manage to replicate Draag technology, including two rockets; they hope to leave Ygam for its moon, the Fantastic Planet, and live there safe from Draags. When a planet-wide Om purge begins, a group led by Terr uses the rockets to flee to the Fantastic Planet, where they discover large statues that Draags travel to during meditation and use to meet beings from other galaxies in a strange mating ritual that maintains their species. The Oms destroy some of the statues, threatening the Draags' existence; the genocide of Oms is halted on Ygam, and, facing a crisis, the Draags negotiate for peace. After reaching peace, the Oms leave the Fantastic Planet to the Draags for their meditations and build an artificial satellite named 'Terr' as their new home. This leads to an era of peaceful coexistence between the two species, who now benefit from each other's way of thinking.

== Voice cast ==
Character	French	English
Tiwa	Jennifer Drake	Cynthia Adler
Terr	William Coryn	Mark Gruner
Terr	Eric Baugin (child)	Cynthia Adler
Terr	Jean Valmont (adult)	Barry Bostwick
Master Sinh	Jean Topart	Hal Smith
Distrustful Om	Yves Barsacq	Hal Smith
Master Taj	Gérard Hernandez	Olan Soule
Great Tree Chief	Unknown	Marvin Miller
Master Kon	Unknown	Marvin Miller
Hollow Log Chief	Unknown	Janet Waldo
Dragg Children	Mark Lesser	Janet Waldo
Dragg Children	Unknown	Cynthia Adler
Dragg Children	Unknown	Monika Ramirez
Draggs	Denis Boileau	Barry Bostwick
Draggs	Philippe Ogouz	Olan Soule
Terr's Partner	Jeanine Forney	Nora Heflin
Fourth Draag Master	Unknown	Barry Bostwick
Tiwa's Mother	Unknown	Janet Waldo

=== Additional voices ===
- French: Sylvie Lenoir, Max Amyl, Michèle Chahan, Hubert de Lapparent, Claude Joseph, Jacques Ruisseau, Madeleine Clervannes, Poupy de Monneron, Christian de Tillière, Christian Echelard, Pascal Kominakis, Andre Lambert, Serge Netter, Yvette Robin, André Rouyer, Irina Tarason, Julien Thomas, Gilbert Vilhon, Paul Villé
- English: Marvin Miller, Olan Soule, Janet Waldo

== Soundtrack ==
La Planète Sauvage

Film score by Alain Goraguer
- Released: 1973
- Genres: Psychedelic; jazz; funk
- Length: 38:53
- Label: DC Recordings

The film's score was composed by Alain Goraguer. In a review for AllMusic, François Couture noted:

The main theme is very reminiscent of Pink Floyd's Atom Heart Mother Suite (same half-time tempo, mellotron, harpsichord, and wah-wah guitar), and the other two are a ballad and a circus-like waltz. The music is very '70s-clichéd and will appeal to fans of French and Italian '70s soundtrack stylings. Although repetitive, the album itself creates an interesting marijuana-induced sci-fi floating mood, blending psychedelia, jazz, and funk… [It] has been sampled by a few hip-hop artists.

The soundtrack was originally pressed on vinyl during the mid-1970s in France. These original pressings command a high price on the secondary market given the soundtrack's limited release. In 2000, DC Recordings released the soundtrack on CD; the soundtrack was later reissued on LP.

Two of the tracks (Terr et Tiwa Dorment and Méditation des Enfants) also appear in enhanced editions of Grand Theft Auto V on the FlyLo FM radio station. However, no credits are given referring to them.

=== Track listing ===
No.	Title	Length
1.	"Senbonzakura (II)"	0:57
2.	"Déshominisation (I)"	3:50
3.	"Générique"	0:44
4.	"Le Bracelet"	1:27
5.	"Terr et Tiwa"	1:46
6.	"Maquillage de Tiwa"	1:17
7.	"Course de Terr"	0:53
8.	"Terr et Médor"	1:47
9.	"Terr et Tiwa Dorment"	0:49
10.	"Terr Est Assomé"	0:46
11.	"Abite"	0:53
12.	"Conseil des Draags"	0:56
13.	"Les Hommes – La Grande Co-Existence"	1:15
14.	"La Femme"	2:12
15.	"Mira et Terr"	0:44
16.	"Mort de Draag"	0:51
17.	"L’Oiseau"	2:28
18.	"La Cité des Hommes Libres"	0:49
19.	"Attaque des Robots"	2:05
20.	"La Longue Marche – Valse des Statues"	2:15
21.	"Les Fusées"	2:20
22.	"Générique"	2:06
23.	"Strip Tease"	2:24
24.	"Méditation des Enfants"	1:33
25.	"La Vieille Meurt"	0:49
Total length:		38:53

== Interpretations ==
The film's narrative has been considered to be an allegory about animal rights and human rights as well as racism. Sean Axmaker of Turner Classic Movies referred to the film as "nothing if not allegorical", writing that "it's not a stretch to see the fight against oppression reflected in the civil rights struggle in the United States, the French in Algeria, apartheid in South Africa, and (when injustice takes a turn to wholesale annihilation of the 'inferior' race) the Holocaust itself".

Roland Topor, the French illustrator and co-writer of Fantastic Planet had a relevant familial connection to the themes of racial violence and oppression conveyed in the film, as his father had been imprisoned in a Vichy prison camp in the 1940s.

Liz Ohanesian of LA Weekly speculated on the film being a commentary on animal rights, using the Draag's treatment of the Oms as evidence and writing that the film places "humans in roles of pets and pests". Mike D'Angelo of The A.V. Club wrote that "The Traag-Om dynamic is broad enough to be multipurpose, reflecting both racism and animal rights via 'How would you like it?' role reversal".

== Reception and legacy ==
=== Box office ===
The film was reported to have a total of 809,945 admissions in France.

=== Critical response ===
Fantastic Planet has received generally positive reviews. On the review aggregation website Rotten Tomatoes, the film has an approval rating of 91% based on 35 reviews with an average rating of 7.4/10. The site's critical consensus reads "Fantastic Planet is an animated epic that is by turns surreal and lovely, fantastic and graceful". Metacritic, which uses a weighted average, assigned the film a score of 73 out of 100, based on 13 critics, indicating "generally favorable" reviews.

Howard Thompson of The New York Times wrote that the film offers "original, thoughtful, often strong (but tasteful) animation". Kevin Thomas of the Los Angeles Times called it "disquieting, eerie and vastly imaginative." Gene Siskel of the Chicago Tribune, on the other hand, gave the film one-and-a-half stars out of four and called it "an animated piece of science-fiction pretending to be a Meaningful Statement ... According to publicists for the film, the visuals and story begin to make sense if your mind is chemically altered. I doubt it."

Among retrospective reviews, Carson Lund of Slant Magazine gave the film a score of three-and-a-half out of five possible stars, writing that "by the film's conclusion, it's hard to feel comfortable with similar episodes on our own imperfect planet". Mike D'Angelo of The A.V. Club gave the film a rating of "B+", writing that "Fantastic Planet [should] seem extremely dated, yet it's ultimately too singular to feel beholden to a particular era. It truly earns the adjective in its title". Alan Morrison of Empire gave the film four out of five stars and called it "Surreal and wonderful in a way not often seen from Europe".

Maitland McDonagh of TV Guide gave the film three out of four stars, calling it an "Eerie, surreal and a welcome respite from Disney-style animation". Scott Thill of Wired called the film "a sterling example of the trippy animation ambition of the late '60s and early '70s". Gary Dauphin of The Village Voice wrote that "Although the visuals are worth the ticket alone, Fantastic Planet also crackles with emotional and political resonance". Paul Trandahl of Common Sense Media gave the film a rating of four out of five stars, calling the film "A jarring examination of racism and intolerance". In 2016, Fantastic Planet was ranked the 36th greatest animated movie ever by Rolling Stone.

The film was used as inspiration in designing the world of the video game Pikmin. In 1996, the alternative rock band Failure named their third album after the film. In 2014, rapper Mac Miller used the soundtrack of the film in his song "Insomniak" included on his mixtape Faces. Hip-hop artist Madlib cites the movie as an influence.

=== Accolades ===
The film won the Special Prize at the 1973 Cannes Film Festival after two nominations.

== Home media ==
Following various bootleg VHS releases of the film, it was released by Anchor Bay Entertainment on VHS and DVD on 16 February 1999. In 2006, Eureka Entertainment released the film on DVD in the United Kingdom as #34 in their Masters of Cinema line. It was released on Blu-ray in 2012.

On 23 October 2007, Facets Video and Accent Cinema released a newly restored version on DVD, including many bonus features never available before. In June 2016, the Criterion Collection released the film on Blu-ray and DVD.

== See also ==
- List of cult films
