= Oms en série =

1957 novel by Stefan Wul

First edition

Oms en série (lit. Oms Linked Together, translation published as Fantastic Planet) is a French science fiction novel written by Stefan Wul, first published in 1957 as one of the Fleuve Noir "Anticipation" novels, It was later adapted into the animated feature film La Planète sauvage (Fantastic Planet, 1973). An English translation was first published in 2010 – over 50 years later – by United Kingdom publisher Creation Books.

== Summary ==
The story, set in the far future, deals with Oms (a play on the French word "hommes", meaning "men"), tiny people from Terre (French for "Earth"), who have been brought by the giant Draags to their home planet, Ygam. Some Oms are domesticated as pets, but others run wild in parks, and are exterminated every two Draag years (one Draag year being roughly equivalent to 45 Earth years). The Draags' treatment of the Oms is ironically contrasted with their high level of technological and spiritual development. The protagonist is a domesticated Om named Terr (again, playing on the French word for Earth) who runs away and joins a group of wild Oms. He has learned some of the Draags' scientific knowledge while in captivity, and uses this to forge a new, equal relationship with the Draags.

== Adaptations ==
Oms en série was adapted into the animated film Fantastic Planet, released in 1973.
