= René Laloux =

French animator and director (1929–2004)

- Born: 13 July 1929; Paris, France
- Died: 15 March 2004 (aged 74); Angoulême, Charente, Poitou-Charentes, France
- Occupations: Animator; Film director Screenwriter
- Years active: 1957–1998

René Laloux (French: [lalu]; 13 July 1929 – 15 March 2004) was a French animator, screenwriter and film director.

== Biography ==
He was born in Paris in 1929 and went to art school to study painting. After some time working in advertising, he got a job in a psychiatric institution where he began experimenting in animation with the interns. It is at the psychiatric institution that he made the 1960 film Monkey's Teeth (Les Dents du Singe), in collaboration with Paul Grimault's studio, and using a script written by the Cour Cheverny's interns.

Another important collaborator of his was Roland Topor with whom Laloux made Dead Time (Les Temps Morts, 1964), The Snails (Les Escargots, 1965) and his most famous work, the feature length Fantastic Planet (La Planète Sauvage, 1973).

Laloux also worked with Jean Giraud (Mœbius) to create the lesser known film Les Maîtres du temps (Time Masters), released in 1982. Laloux's 1987 film, Gandahar, was released in the US as Light Years, and made in cooperation with the artist Caza. The US version was redubbed by Harvey Weinstein, from a screenplay adapted by Isaac Asimov. The US version was not as successful as the French, grossing less than $400,000 on its release.

Laloux died of a heart attack on 14 March 2004 in Angoulême, Charente, Poitou-Charentes, France.

== Filmography ==
Feature films

- Fantastic Planet (La Planète Sauvage) (1973)
- Time Masters (1982)
- Gandahar (1987) (released in the U.S. in bowdlerized form under the title Light Years)

Short films

- Tick-Tock (Tic-Tac) (1957)
- Les Achalunés (1958)
- The Monkey's Teeth (Les Dents du singe) (1960)
- Dead Times (Les Temps morts) (1965)
- The Snails (Les Escargots) (1966)
- The Play (1975)
- Quality Control (1984)
- The Captive (La Prisonnière) (1985)
- How Wang-fo Was Saved (Comment Wang-Fo fut sauvé) (1987)
- Eye of the Wolf (L'Œil du loup) (1998) (screenwriter only)
