= Lois McMaster Bujold bibliography =

This is the complete list of works by American science fiction and fantasy author Lois McMaster Bujold.

== Bibliography ==
=== Vorkosigan Saga ===
==== Cordelia Naismith ====
- Shards of Honor (1986)
- Barrayar (1991)
- Cordelia's Honor (1996)—Combined edition of Shards of Honor and Barrayar with an afterword by the author.
- Gentleman Jole and the Red Queen (2016)

==== Miles Vorkosigan ====
- The Warrior's Apprentice (1986)
- Brothers in Arms (1989)
- Borders of Infinity (1989) including "The Mountains of Mourning", "Labyrinth", and "The Borders of Infinity"
- The Vor Game (1990)
- Vorkosigan's Game (omnibus: The Vor Game, Borders of Infinity; 1992)
- Mirror Dance (1994)
- Cetaganda (1995)
- Memory (1996)
- Young Miles (omnibus: The Warrior's Apprentice, "The Mountains of Mourning", The Vor Game; 1997)
- Komarr (1998)
- A Civil Campaign (1999)
- Miles, Mystery and Mayhem (omnibus: Cetaganda, Ethan of Athos, "Labyrinth"; 2001)
- Diplomatic Immunity (2002)
- Miles Errant (omnibus: "The Borders of Infinity", Brothers in Arms, Mirror Dance; 2002)
- Miles, Mutants and Microbes (omnibus: Falling Free, "Labyrinth", Diplomatic Immunity; 2007)
- Miles in Love (omnibus: Komarr, A Civil Campaign, Winterfair Gifts; 2008)
- Cryoburn (2010)

==== Other ====
- Ethan of Athos (1986)
- Falling Free (1988)
- "Dreamweaver's Dilemma" (novelette, 1996)
- Winterfair Gifts (novella, 2004)
- Captain Vorpatril's Alliance (2012)
- The Flowers of Vashnoi (novella, 2018)

==== Internal chronology ====
- "Dreamweaver's Dilemma" (1995)—Set in the Vorkosigan universe long before the rest of the series (included in the collection Dreamweaver's Dilemma) NESFA Press
- Falling Free (1988)—Set approximately 200 years before the birth of Miles Vorkosigan—Nebula Award winner, 1988, Hugo Award nominee, 1989
- Shards of Honor (1986)—Set approximately one year before the birth of Miles Vorkosigan
- Barrayar (1991)—Hugo Award winner, Locus Award winner, 1992, Nebula Award nominee, 1991
- The Warrior's Apprentice (1986)
- The Mountains of Mourning (1989)—Hugo Award winner, Nebula Award winner. First published in Analog magazine; included in Borders of Infinity
- Weatherman (1990)
- The Vor Game (1990)—Hugo Award winner, Locus Award nominee, 1991
- Cetaganda (1995) Locus Award nominee, 1997
- Ethan of Athos (1986)—Miles Vorkosigan is referred to, but does not actually appear, in this novel.
- Labyrinth (1989)—First published in Analog magazine; included in Borders of Infinity.
- The Borders of Infinity (1987)—First published in Free Lancers; included in Borders of Infinity; available online via Baen's Webscriptions.
- Brothers in Arms (1989)
- Borders of Infinity (1989)—Collection of The Mountains of Mourning, Labyrinth and The Borders of Infinity, tied together with an original frame story interspliced between them, which is set shortly after Brothers in Arms.
- Mirror Dance (1994)—Hugo Award winner, Locus Award winner, 1995
- Memory (1996)—Hugo Award nominee, Nebula Award nominee, Locus Award nominee, 1997
- Komarr (1998)
- A Civil Campaign (2000)—Hugo Award nominee, Nebula Award nominee, Locus Award nominee, 2000
- Winterfair Gifts (2003 in Croatian, as Zimoslavni Darovi; 2004 in English)—First published in English in Irresistible Forces, a science fiction/romance genre crossover anthology edited by Catherine Asaro. Also in the omnibus Miles in Love. The Winterfair Gifts novella is also available as a standalone ebook from Fictionwise.
- Diplomatic Immunity (2002)—Nebula Award nominee, 2003
- Captain Vorpatril's Alliance (2012)—Hugo Award nominee, 2013
- The Flowers of Vashnoi (2018)
- Cryoburn (2010)—Hugo Award nominee, 2011
- Gentleman Jole and the Red Queen (2016)

==== Omnibus volumes ====
- Cordelia's Honor—contains Shards of Honor and Barrayar
- Young Miles—contains The Warrior's Apprentice, The Mountains of Mourning, and The Vor Game
- Miles, Mystery, and Mayhem—Cetaganda, Ethan of Athos, and Labyrinth
- Miles Errant—The Borders of Infinity, Brothers in Arms, and Mirror Dance
- Miles in Love—Komarr, A Civil Campaign, and Winterfair Gifts
- Miles, Mutants and Microbes—Falling Free, Diplomatic Immunity, and Labyrinth
- Test of Honor—out of print; contains Shards of Honor and The Warrior's Apprentice
- Vorkosigan's Game—out of print; contains The Vor Game, The Mountains of Mourning, Labyrinth, and The Borders of Infinity, with the framing story for the collection Borders of Infinity

==== Audiobooks ====
Cassette tape and CD versions of Falling Free, Shards of Honor, Barrayar, The Warrior's Apprentice, The Vor Game, Cetaganda, Ethan of Athos, Borders of Infinity, and Brothers in Arms were produced by The Reader's Chair. This company is no longer in business.

Currently, unabridged audio CD editions are available (retail and library), via iPhone/iPod Touch apps using the Folium enhancedAudio player, MP3, Playaway and cassette versions through Blackstone Audio for Falling Free, Shards of Honor, Barrayar, The Warrior's Apprentice, The Vor Game, Cetaganda, Ethan of Athos, Brothers in Arms, Borders of Infinity, Mirror Dance, Memory, Komarr, A Civil Campaign, Winterfair Gifts, Diplomatic Immunity, Cryoburn, Captain Vorpatril's Alliance, and Gentleman Jole and the Red Queen.

Most titles produced by Blackstone Audio are also available for download on Audible.com and from the websites of several public libraries via overdrive.com and Hoopla. The enhancedAudio app versions are available via the Apple iTunes Store and can be previewed at the BlackstoneAudioApps.com website.

==== Comic books ====
The Vorkosigan Saga has also been adapted for a comic book in France:

- La saga Vorkosigan volume 1 : L'apprentissage du guerrier (The Warrior's Apprentice; literally, "the warrior's apprenticeship"), written by Dominique Latil (scenario) and José Maria Beroy (drawings and colors; 2010).

=== The World of the Five Gods ===
The World of the Five Gods was once informally titled "the Chalion series", but none of the stories after The Curse of Chalion and Paladin of Souls were actually set in Chalion, so the name was abandoned as the series grew.

==== Chalion ====
- The Curse of Chalion (2001) Hugo, Locus Fantasy, and World Fantasy Awards nominee, 2002
- Paladin of Souls (2003; sequel to The Curse of Chalion) Hugo, Nebula and Locus Fantasy Awards winner, 2004

==== The Weald ====
- The Hallowed Hunt (2005) Locus Fantasy Award nominee, 2006

==== Penric and Desdemona (publication order) ====
- Penric's Demon (2015; novella, Hugo Award nominee 2016)
- Penric and the Shaman (2016; standalone novella, Hugo Award nominee 2017)
- Penric's Mission (2016; novella)
- Mira's Last Dance (2017; novella)
- Penric's Fox (2017; novella; comes between Penric and the Shaman and Penric's Mission in series-internal chronology)
- The Prisoner of Limnos (2017; novella)
- The Orphans of Raspay (2019; novella)
- The Physicians of Vilnoc (2020; novella)
- Masquerade in Lodi (2020; novella; comes between Penric's Fox and Penric's Mission in series-internal chronology)
- The Assassins of Thasalon (2021; novel)
- Knot of Shadows (2021; novella)
- Demon Daughter (2024; novella)
- Penric and the Bandit (2024; novella)
- The Adventure of the Demonic Ox (2025; novella)
- Testimony of Mute Things (2025; novella; takes place after Penric and the Shaman)
- Darksight Dare (2026; novella)

==== Omnibus volumes ====
1. Penric's Progress (2020)—contains "Penric's Demon", "Penric and the Shaman", and "Penric's Fox"
2. Penric's Travels (2020)—contains "Penric's Mission", "Mira's Last Dance", and "The Prisoner of Limnos"
3. Penric's Labors (2022)—contains "Masquerade in Lodi", "The Orphans of Raspay", and "The Physicians of Vilnoc"
4. Penric's Intrigues (2026)—contains "The Assassins of Thasalon" and "Knot of Shadows"

=== Sharing Knife series ===
The Sharing Knife is a single fantasy novel published in four volumes:

- Beguilement (2006)
- Legacy (2007)
- Passage (2008)
- Horizon (2009)

These are followed by a short novel or long novella:

- Knife Children (2019)

=== Other titles ===
- The Spirit Ring (1993) Locus Fantasy Award nominee, 1993
- Sidelines: Talks and Essays (2013)
- Proto Zoa: Five Early Short Stories (2011 ebook, 2016 audiobook)

=== Audiobooks ===
Blackstone Audio produces CD editions, MP3, Playaway, and cassette versions of The Curse of Chalion, Paladin of Souls, The Hallowed Hunt, The Sharing Knife: Beguilement, Legacy, Passage and Horizon. All of these titles are also available from Audible.com and emusic.com.
