= Miles Vorkosigan =

Fictional protagonist in novel series by Lois McMaster Bujold

Miles Naismith Vorkosigan is a protagonist of a series of science fiction novels and short stories known as the Vorkosigan Saga, written by American author Lois McMaster Bujold.

== Personality ==
=== Traits ===
Miles is depicted as both brilliant (especially in military tactics) and hyperactive; one of his girlfriends describes him as "addicted to adrenaline rushes". He compulsively and constantly challenges the world, sometimes with disastrous consequences, although more often than not, his mind overcomes his physical weakness. As Simon Illyan says to Ekaterin when Miles is courting her in A Civil Campaign, "Do you know all those old folk tales where the Count tries to get rid of his only daughter's unsuitable suitor by giving him three impossible tasks? Don't ever try that with Miles. Just ... don't."

He has a strong tendency to manipulate people and is very good at bluffing. The Dendarii Free Mercenaries, for instance, begin as pure imaginative figment, and through frantic improvisation, he conceals his deception from his recruits; their accomplishments make real his invention. Despite the initial successes of this "lie first, fix later" strategy, it always makes for manic juggling of various falsehoods and stories, and often ends up working against him. For instance: first, he is caught lying about his seizure disorder, and then the widow he loves is enraged when she discovers that he has been attempting to court her by stealth during her socially-recognized period of mourning.

=== Romance and Sexuality ===
His childhood love interest is Elena Bothari, the daughter of Sergeant Konstantin Bothari, but the feeling is not reciprocated. In the novel Cetaganda (1996), Miles has an unrequited crush on Rian Degtiar, the "Handmaiden of the Star Crèche" who later becomes an Empress of Cetaganda. As his alter ego, Admiral Naismith, Miles has relationships with Admiral Elli Quinn of the Dendarii Mercenaries and Taura, a sergeant of the same mercenary outfit who was originally created as a military experiment and later rescued by Miles in the short story "Labyrinth". In the long term, Miles is looking for a wife who will become the future Lady Vorkosigan, a prospect that drives his non-Barrayaran lovers away. Eventually he falls for and wins the love of Ekaterin Vorsoisson in the novel Komarr (1998).

While Miles primarily falls for women, in Diplomatic Immunity (2002) he is forced to confront and admit his attraction for Betan Bel Thorne, a non-binary and intersex character:

In their Dendarii days Bel had taken out its unrequited lust for Miles in a series of half-joking passes, half-regretfully declined. Miles repented his younger sexual reticence altogether, now. Profoundly. We should have taken our chances back then, when we were young and beautiful and didn't even know it. And Bel had been beautiful, in its own ironic way, living and moving at ease in a body athletic, healthy, and trim. [emphasis in original]

— Miles Vorkosigan, in Lois McMaster Bujold, Diplomatic Immunity, Chapter 14

=== Inspiration ===
In an article in The Vorkosigan Companion, Bujold acknowledged several real-life inspirations for the character: T. E. Lawrence, a young Winston Churchill, "a physical template in a handicapped hospital pharmacist I'd worked with", and even herself (the "great man's son syndrome"). She also noted that she and her creation adopted dual personas, she as a housewife and writer, he as an aristocratic Vor scion and mercenary Admiral Naismith. However, she also asserted that Miles developed a personality all his own from the first book, The Warrior's Apprentice.

== Reception ==
In the New York Review of Science Fiction, October 1998 (Number 122), Miles is summarized as follows:

Miles bestrides the Vorkosigan universe, a figure whose panache conquers readers as fast as fellow characters, and who has bent the shape of the military subgenre along with most of the rules of SF: even as he re-writes the manual for military heroes, Miles slews Bujold's books irrevocably toward the primacy of character. Beyond that, his long-term development is a phenomenon in either mainstream or genre fiction. We are all familiar with the serial hero, from Mulder and Scully to Sherlock Holmes: but how many of them, in the course of their adventures, change and mature, let alone metamorphose? And how many burst generic conventions in the process? On the other hand, mainstream fiction and 'high' literature have traditionally focussed on the character and/or development of a protagonist; but how many such writers, from Dickens onward, have taken it beyond a single book? (...) I can think of no other SF characterisation that combines such appeal with such a sustained and complex development, far less such an expansion of generic boundaries. Miles alone makes Bujold worthy of a comparison with Le Guin.

== Fictional character biography ==
=== Traumatic birth ===
Miles Vorkosigan is the son of Aral Vorkosigan of the planet Barrayar and his Betan wife Cordelia Naismith. He has several physical impairments due to an assassination attempt directed at his parents. A poison gas grenade was thrown into their bedroom during Cordelia's pregnancy with Miles but the couple's lives were saved by quick administration of the antidote—a violent teratogen that destroys skeletal development in a growing fetus.

The only available treatment for the fetus was experimental at best, and would have been fatal to the mother. Miles was therefore transferred to an artificial uterine replicator in an effort to salvage his bone development. While in the replicator, Miles was kidnapped from the hospital and used as a hostage against his father by Vidal Vordarian, the leader of the Vordarian pretendership, putting a temporary halt to the treatments. He was ultimately born with "chalk-stick bones, friable as talc", and is described as "wizened as an infant homunculus."

=== Appearance ===
Despite repeated corrective surgeries, Miles's height only reaches four-foot-nine at maturity. He has his mother's sea grey eyes and his father's dark hair. Miles is described as winter pale with laugh lines around his eyes and pain lines around his mouth. Miles was slightly hunch-backed, but after his death and cryo-revival, a surgeon managed to straighten his spine a bit, giving him a valued additional centimeter of height. Miles has fine scars running all over his body from having his easily broken bones replaced with synthetics in his twenties. Many people on Barrayar are prejudiced against him because they incorrectly believe him to be a mutant. "Mutants" (real or perceived, which are common on Barrayar due to a small population at the beginning of the Time of Isolation) are highly undesirable on Barrayar, and children visibly carrying a mutated gene are often killed by their families. Though the Time of Isolation is over, prejudice against mutants and the physically disabled is still very high.

=== Abnormal name for the abnormal lord ===
When his famous grandfather learns of the prenatal damage, he tries to abort the fetus in the replicator, and later tries to kill the infant because he believes that "We cannot afford to have a deformed Count Vorkosigan." Count Piotr is thwarted in this by his own armsman, Sergeant Bothari, who is devoted to Cordelia. Vor male heirs are usually named with the first name of the paternal grandfather as the child's first name, and the first name of the maternal grandfather as the middle name, and before the soltoxin Miles was to be named Piotr Miles Vorkosigan. When the Count, frustrated in his attempted infanticide, disinherits Aral and his family from his name and his property, Cordelia instead bestows her deceased father's full name on her son, henceforth Miles Naismith Vorkosigan.

General Count Piotr is reconciled to his son, daughter-in-law and grandson when Miles becomes able to walk at age five, and shows a forceful interest in his grandfather's beloved horses. This common ground, and observation of Miles' intelligence and determination, earns the boy Piotr's respect and acceptance, and they have a closer though still challenging relationship until the Count's death.

=== Childhood and adolescence ===
As a child, Miles is highly energetic and enjoys swimming and horseback riding, despite frequent injuries and broken bones. To compensate for the social disadvantage of his appearance, he develops tremendous charm and manipulation skills, even getting the Koudelka girls to march around as a "precision drill team". He has a series of adventures and misadventures, including driving a hover tank through a barn at age 12. His companions when growing up include Elena Bothari, Miles's bodyguard's daughter; his cousin, Ivan Vorpatril; and his foster-brother, Emperor Gregor Vorbarra.

Miles grows up around the corridors of power, and learns to see his father's powerful colleagues not as objects of awe but as fixtures in his home, as he listens to their frank discussions and arguments. This behind-the-scenes perspective will profoundly influence the course of his career.

At the age of 17, he fails the physical test to enter the Barrayaran Imperial Military Service Academy by jumping from a wall obstacle and breaking both legs on landing. To get over this disappointment, he takes a trip to his mother's home world, Beta Colony; has (unintended) space adventures for a few months; and improvises a force called the Dendarii Mercenaries into existence. In the process, his lifelong protector Sergeant Bothari is killed. Miles is charged with treason, exonerated, and (through a little nepotism) accepted into the Barrayaran Imperial Military Service. After graduating he is asked to resolve an infanticide charge in Silvy Vale, a rural area of his father's district (described in "The Mountains of Mourning"). The people he encounters and his experiences there strongly influence his sense of purpose and identity throughout the rest of his life.

=== ImpSec career ===
Shortly after graduating from the academy Miles is assigned to the worst posting in the Barrayaran Empire: Kyril Island. Kyril Island is a winter infantry training post often called "Camp Permafrost". Miles is assigned as the weather officer for the base. There is an accident where a mutagenic poison is spilled and a few soldiers are ordered to clean it up without adequate protective gear. They refuse the order, and the infuriated base commander orders them to strip at gunpoint and stay outside in the snow until they are ready to comply. Deciding to join the objectors on ethical grounds, a naked Miles convinces the base commander to use an alternative method, but at the cost of ending his career as he is charged with mutiny.

When the full story comes out, Miles's father leans on Simon Illyan to have Miles work in Covert Ops directly under Illyan. Miles is given difficult, sometimes seemingly impossible missions. He works only under Illyan with one rule: "Deliver results or pay with your ass". Working deep cover missions in the persona of Miles Naismith, Miles is forced to improvise solutions to difficult questions extemporaneously. More often than not Miles talks his way into and out of life-threatening situations. Unfortunately, his physical appearance makes him hard to forget. When cornered by a reporter who sees the similarity between Miles Vorkosigan and Miles Naismith, he says that they are clone brothers.

At age 24, Miles' life becomes more complicated when he discovers that he has an actual clone, created by a Komarran terrorist with the aim of killing Miles, his family, and the Emperor, and ultimately becoming himself Emperor of Barrayar. His friends urge him to kill the clone, but due to the Betan influence on his upbringing, Miles thinks of the clone as his brother and lets him go free. Four years later, Miles is killed while trying to rescue his clone-brother, and although he is successfully cryo-frozen and revived, he is left with a condition which causes periodic seizures, particularly under great stress. He tries to conceal this from Simon Illyan, his boss and chief of Imperial Security (ImpSec). Miles falsifies a report after he has a seizure in combat, but this is detected and he is fired from ImpSec, putting an end to his life with the Dendarii as well. Miles is devastated as the character of Naismith had become the expression of everything he ever wanted, in essence he loses himself and his sense of purpose.

Almost immediately, he becomes suspicious of a plot against Illyan who has fallen ill and is being kept isolated; he requests the assignment of an Imperial Auditor to help him investigate the situation, but instead, the Emperor surprises him by making him the "Ninth Auditor", a temporary designation by tradition, but nonetheless endowed with full Auditor powers. During the course of the investigation Miles confronts his quest for identity and wins.

His handling and solving of the case is reviewed by the other Auditors and his status as Auditor is made permanent. Miles is the first Imperial Auditor in the history of the Vorkosigans.

=== Mid life—30s on ===
Shortly thereafter, Vorkosigan accompanies one of his new colleagues, Lord Auditor Vorthys, to Komarr, home to the sole wormhole connecting Barrayar to the rest of the Nexus. (Barrayar, led by his father, conquered Komarr some years before Miles' birth in order to gain control of that vital access). Their mission is to investigate an accident involving the solar energy array orbiting Komarr; the accident turns out to have been caused by the secret testing of a new weapon with which Komarran conspirators hope to permanently collapse the wormhole and isolate Barrayar again. Miles is quartered with Lord Auditor Vorthys' niece and her husband, a Barrayaran official. In the course of the investigation, Miles survives yet another brush with death although his host, who has become ensnared in the plot, does not survive. To make a bad situation worse, Miles has fallen in love with his host's wife (later widow), Ekaterin, who just happens to be on the verge of leaving her emotionally abusive husband when disaster strikes. She is then instrumental in foiling the plot. The entire affair is classified as secret due both to the political nature of the conspiracy and the new technology of the Komarran secret weapon.

Ekaterin, professing after her bad experiences with her late husband to be violently allergic to marriage, moves back to Barrayar with her nine-year-old son, Nikolai, to stay with her uncle, Lord Auditor Vorthys. Miles embarks upon a bizarre, if typically complicated, strategy: he will woo Ekaterin without telling her, in the hope that she can be persuaded to reconsider her stance. Miles's plan backfires during a particularly disastrous dinner party to which Ekaterin is invited. She is initially furious when she discovers his machinations. An additional complication arises when rumors arise alleging that Miles murdered her husband in order to marry her. Due to the Imperial security concerns surrounding her husband's death, she is not at liberty to refute the allegations, even when her relatives attempt to move her son to "safety". This provokes her to drastic action: she proposes to Miles herself in a most public fashion; he accepts without hesitation.

In "Winterfair Gifts", they are married during the mid-winter festival that marks the beginning of a new year on Barrayar, and survive yet another attack in which Ekaterin is poisoned by one of Miles' Auditorial suspects. The plot is foiled by Taura, one of his many former lovers, and Roic, one of his Armsmen.

Their honeymoon is delayed by a considerable period, during which they conceive twins who are nurtured in uterine replicators; while this is by now normal for well-to-do Barrayaran couples, it also conveniently allows the happy couple to leave the planet while their unborn children remain safely at home. In Diplomatic Immunity, Emperor Gregor dispatches his youngest Auditor to defuse a diplomatic crisis at a Quaddie space station. The couple becomes embroiled in yet another deadly, complicated situation involving potential war with Cetaganda. Happily, Miles survives a near-death illness caused by exposure to a Cetagandan nanotech biological weapon, though he does suffer permanent damage, and they are able to return to Barrayar just in time for their children's birth—a son named Aral Alexander and a daughter named Helen Natalia.

=== Countship ===
Following the death of his father from a brain aneurysm on Sergyar, Miles, at age 39, succeeds to the Countship of the Vorkosigan District. At that time, he has a stepson (Nikolai [approximately 17]), a son (Aral Alexander [5]), and three daughters (Helen Natalia [5], Lizzie [3], and Taurie [10 months]). In Gentleman Jole and the Red Queen, Alex and Helen are 11, Elizabeth is 8, Taurie is 5 and Selig with his not-twin Simone are two-ish.

Bujold has stated that she feels Miles dies at age 57; however, when later asked if she still had that opinion, she emphasized that "The writer should always reserve the right to have a better idea."

== Admiral Naismith ==
Admiral Naismith is an alter ego and cover identity that Miles developed as a youth and used until the novel Memory.

=== Creation of Naismith ===
Miles Vorkosigan developed an alternative identity as Admiral Naismith, under which he ran the Dendarii Mercenaries (formally the Oseran Mercenaries until Miles took over from Admiral Oser) until the novel Memory. It began as a lie but eventually evolved into a real cover identity. Even this was an improvisation, as Miles found himself facing charges of treason for raising a private army, and had to offer the Dendarii as a "Crown Troop" working in the service of Emperor Gregor to deflect the charges. Necessarily he had to be Admiral Naismith so that the Dendarii could carry out missions on behalf of Barrayar without the responsibility for those missions being traced back to Barrayar itself. Given the restricted life of a Vor lordling, and the galaxy-spanning horizons available to Naismith, Miles eventually came to value Naismith's life over the one he was born to.

According to his mother, Cordelia, Miles invented Naismith, because Barrayar gave him "so much unbearable stress, so much pain, he created an entire other personality to escape into. He then persuaded several thousand galactic mercenaries to support his psychosis, and ... conned the Barrayaran Imperium into paying for it all"

=== Identity ===
Miles Vorkosigan himself once said to Emperor Gregor Vorbarra of Barrayar, "I guess Naismith is me with no brakes. No constraints." This characteristic makes him a very dangerous enemy, as he is willing to take risks that most normal people would avoid. He also improvises brilliantly. Sent into a Cetagandan prison camp to find and extract one important Marilacan guerrilla leader, he managed to convert the mission into a full-scale breakout of most of the prisoners, using nothing more than the force of his personality, a screwball religion espoused by one of the inmates, and some coded comments picked up by his support team, who had infiltrated the Cetagandan garrison to monitor the mission. The success of this mission, and the ensuing rebellion on Marilac, caused the Cetagandans to put a price on Miles' head.

In theory, Naismith is a Betan by birth and speaks with the distinctive nasal Betan accent, which Miles learned from his mother. The typical Barrayaran accent is described as guttural in comparison. The back story that Miles improvised when taking over the Oseran mercenaries had him being part of a larger mercenary group, but in time it became apparent to veterans such as Captains Ky Tung and Bel Thorne that this was a lie. Officially the truth was known only to Miles, Elena Bothari, her husband Baz Jesek, Arde Mayhew, and Miles's second-in-command and lover Elli Quinn.

Later, Miles developed a cover that he was a clone made by the Cetagandans meant to infiltrate Barrayar by replacing Miles Vorkosigan. This turned out to be ironic, as there was a real clone made for just that purpose, but by Komarrans. When Miles encountered, and made peace with, his clone brother Mark, this allowed Miles to cement his cover by having two Cetagandans, an officer and an intelligence agent, see both Miles and Mark together.

Eventually, switching between Naismith and Vorkosigan became a problem for Miles. This was especially true on Earth, when fleeing the Cetagandans, he had to work in the Barrayaran embassy as Miles Vorkosigan, while still commanding the fleet during a difficult and expensive refit. It was complicated by his developing affair with Elli Quinn, who was adamant that while she loved Admiral Naismith, she did not like Lord Vorkosigan at all. It also complicated his dealings with various plots on his life, since he did not always know which were directed at Naismith, and which at Vorkosigan.

=== Decline and fall ===
Naismith—and Vorkosigan—was fatally shot with a needle grenade during a botched rescue mission on the planet Jackson's Whole. Miles was trying to rescue his clone brother Mark, who had impersonated Naismith for his own purposes. Fortunately cryo-preservation was available and eventually Miles was revived. Meanwhile, Mark, despite gorging himself into obesity, had to become Naismith for a time. The chaotic story is described in the novel Mirror Dance.

As a result of his death and cryo-preservation, Miles Vorkosigan suffered neurological damage resulting in seizures triggered by the buildup of stress-related neurotransmitters, ensuring that he is most likely to have a seizure when he most needs to be lucid. When a seizure results in a badly botched mission, Miles covers it up. Illyan quickly discovers the coverup and Miles, in both personas, is fired from ImpSec. This precipitates a crisis for Miles, for whom Admiral Naismith was not just a role but his life—a better one, perhaps, than his "real" life on Barrayar. On hearing the news of Miles' dismissal, his mother, Cordelia Vorkosigan, bet her husband Aral Vorkosigan that Miles would choose "the little admiral" and run off with the Mercenaries.

Miles Vorkosigan mourned the loss of Admiral Naismith for a long time. However, his new role as Imperial Auditor gives him the opportunity to use Naismith's talents once more but as part of Lord Vorkosigan's life. As Ivan Vorpatril describes it, Vorkosigan as Naismith means "full tilt forward, no inhibitions, innocent bystanders scramble for their lives." Miles at last finds that he doesn't need to run away from Barrayar to have both the Lord and the Admiral.

Even had Miles not been fired from ImpSec, Naismith's effectiveness as a cover was coming to an end. During the celebration of Emperor Gregor's wedding, ghem-General Dag Benin passed Miles a message from the Cetagandan Emperor, expressing condolences over Naismith's death. The clear implication is that the Cetagandans have at some point learned the truth. Benin also informs Miles that the Emperor would prefer Naismith to remain deceased, to which Miles responded, "I trust his resurrection will not be required."

=== Fictional appearances ===
Miles Vorkosigan first appeared in Bujold's novel The Warrior's Apprentice (1986), although his parents had appeared in the earlier Shards of Honor (also 1986), set before Miles's birth.

According to The Vorkosigan Companion, the internal sequence of the books featuring Miles (although not the order in which they were written) is:

Vorkosigan Saga timeline
Time / Age (Note: Relative to series protagonist Miles Vorkosigan)	Title	First published	Hugo	Nebula	Locus	Omnibus collection
-500	"Dreamweaver's Dilemma" (Note: Set in same universe, but no Vorkosigan family appearances)	1996				Dreamweaver's Dilemma (Note: Published in Feb 1996 for the Boskone 33 conference; original story was written c. 1982)
-200	Falling Free	1988 (Note: Originally published serially in Analog between December 1987 and February 1988)	Finalist	Won		Miles, Mutants & Microbes (Note: Also includes the novella "Labyrinth")
-1	Shards of Honor (Note: Primarily focuses on Cordelia Naismith, Miles' mother) (Note: Novel incorporates the short story "Aftermaths" as an epilogue; "Aftermaths" was originally published in Far Frontiers 5 (Spring 1986))	1986				Cordelia's Honor
-0	Barrayar	1991	Won	Finalist	Won	Cordelia's Honor
+17	The Warrior's Apprentice	1986				Young Miles
+20	"The Mountains of Mourning" in Borders of Infinity (Note: Borders of Infinity is a three-novella anthology with a framing story set when Miles is 25 years old.)	1989 (Note: Originally published in Analog magazine, May 1989)	Won	Won		Young Miles
+20	The Vor Game (Note: Incorporates the short story "Weatherman", which was originally published in Analog, Feb 1990)	1990	Won	Finalist (Note: For "Weatherman")	Finalist	Young Miles
+22	Cetaganda	1995			Finalist	Miles, Mystery & Mayhem
+22	Ethan of Athos	1986				Miles, Mystery & Mayhem
+23	"Labyrinth" in Borders of Infinity	1989 (Note: Originally published in Analog magazine, August 1989)				Miles, Mystery & Mayhem
+24	"The Borders of Infinity" in Borders of Infinity	1987 (Note: Originally published in the anthology Free Lancers (1987))				Miles Errant
+24	Brothers in Arms	1989				Miles Errant
+28	Mirror Dance	1994	Won		Won	Miles Errant
+29	Memory	1996	Finalist	Finalist	Finalist	(none)
+30	Komarr	1998				Miles in Love
+30	A Civil Campaign	1999	Finalist	Finalist	Finalist	Miles in Love
+31	"Winterfair Gifts" in Irresistible Forces (Note: Irresistible Forces is an anthology edited by Catherine Asaro)	2004	Finalist			Miles in Love
+32	Diplomatic Immunity	2002		Finalist		Miles, Mutants & Microbes
+35	Captain Vorpatril's Alliance (Note: Primarily focuses on cousin Ivan Vorpatril; Miles is a minor character)	2012	Finalist			(none)
+35	"The Flowers of Vashnoi"	2018				(none)
+39	Cryoburn	2010	Finalist		Finalist	(none)
+42	Gentleman Jole and the Red Queen	2016				(none)

== Mark Vorkosigan ==
Mark Vorkosigan is Miles' clone-brother, born six years after Miles. He is created in a plot by Ser Galen, a Komarran terrorist, to replace Miles, assassinate Miles' father Aral and Emperor Gregor Vorbarra, claim the Imperial Throne, and foment chaos and revolution. Miles, under the influence of his mother's Betan upbringing, refuses to kill Mark or even hinder him, and only desires that he come to Barrayar as a true Vorkosigan. Mark, after he kills Ser Galen (who had become both his tormentor and father-figure) refuses, and goes his own way. Mark looks a bit different than Miles because of crude attempts to simulate the effects of the chemical Miles was exposed to in utero that affected the development of his bones (Brothers in Arms)

However, after a few years, Mark resurfaces and infiltrates the Dendarii Mercenaries by posing as Admiral Miles Naismith, planning to send them on a mission to liberate more than 40 clones who are scheduled for body harvesting. The scheme is only semi-successful, as the clones are rescued, but Miles is seemingly killed by a needle grenade. While Miles' body is missing (it turns out he is in stasis in cryogenic freeze, but found by people who do not know his true identity), Mark is returned to Barrayar, now uncomfortably situated as Count Vorkosigan's heir if Miles is dead. Mark is able to convince Countess Vorkosigan to allow him to mount a rescue mission—to Illyan's dismay—for Miles. Mark is captured by Baron Ryoval, who subjects him to physical, sexual and mental torture, during which Mark develops an unusual psychosis that he later dubs "The Black Gang", a group of specialist sub-personalities: Grunt (Mark's sexuality), Gorge (Mark's gluttony), Howl (Mark's masochism), and Killer (Mark's assassin personality). "The Black Gang" protects a fifth personality, "Lord Mark" (Marks own, fragile and newborn personal identity) from the tortures inflicted on it by Ryoval, and after Killer kills Ryoval, Lord Mark emerges to take charge, being the only one who can think outside of one purpose. The Black Gang serve Lord Mark well—using his split personality, he is able to kill the Baron, and sell 90% of his assets to the Baron's rival, Fell, receiving a healthy cut (of a value of approximately 2 million Betan dollars, or 8 - 10 million Barrayaran marks) of Ryoval's estate and ownership of a bioresearch firm that Mark subsidizes to combat the "clone chop shops" of Jackson's Whole. He also attracts the attentions of Kareen Koudelka, the youngest daughter of Count and Countess Vorkosigan's closest family friends. (Mirror Dance)

To distinguish himself from Miles, Mark allows himself to grow grotesquely overweight. Contrary to Miles, Mark is deadly in unarmed combat, having been trained as an assassin, and having developed masochistic tendencies. When he is relatively thinner, he has been described as "a small tank". His romance with Kareen deepened while they were both studying on Beta Colony. Unfortunately, his relationship became strained upon their return to Barrayar when Kareen's parents learned of their sexual relationship at Miles' famously disastrous dinner party. Countess Vorkosigan ultimately stepped in and brokered an arrangement for them. During this time, Mark invested in a business deal with the galactic scientist Enrique Borgos, who had created a new insect livestock he called "Butter Bugs". Initially grotesque, if highly functional, Ekaterin Vorsoissons's design changes made the newly renamed "Glorious Bugs" highly popular. (A Civil Campaign).

Mark's legal status changes depending on which set of laws is applied. There is no Barrayaran tradition or law regarding clones, but as several characters observe during the Saga, "anything done twice on Barrayar is a tradition". Mark is pushed out into Vor society as Miles' brother and, at first, potential heir to the title of Count Vorkosigan. Other Vor may challenge this, if they dare. Under the laws of Beta Colony, the birthplace of Cordelia Naismith, Mark could be considered Cordelia's son, Miles's son, or the son of Ser Galen, depending on how the circumstances of his creation are interpreted. Mark regards himself as a native of Jackson's Whole, where there is no law of any kind other than the "Golden Rule", as in "He who has the gold makes the rules." Thus, on Jackson's Whole, Mark was created with no human rights and could have been killed at any time.

He is half-owner of the Durona Group, sharing control with Lily Durona. He travels across the galaxy of his far-flung financial empire with his unmarried life partner Kareen Koudelka, who serves as the good cop to his bad cop during business meetings.

== Analysis ==
Miles has been discussed as an example of an atypical space opera, science fiction hero - "short and handicapped, unlike the traditional tall, dark and handsome heroes of popular space opera". He wins against adversity because of his skills, including rhetorical ones, rather than physical prowess.
