= List of Vorkosigan Saga characters =

This is a list of Vorkosigan Saga characters created by Lois McMaster Bujold in a series of novels and short stories.

== Barrayarans ==
- Miles Vorkosigan is the main protagonist of the series. He is born with severe physical disabilities, including very brittle bones, due to a failed attempt to assassinate his parents, Aral and Cordelia Vorkosigan, with a chemical weapon while the latter was pregnant with him. He endures many medical treatments during his early life, and as an adult, he is short and slightly hunchbacked. However, he is highly intelligent, very energetic and extremely, even pathologically, driven to excel. He becomes a space mercenary admiral (creating the Dendarii Mercenaries on the fly out of personnel at hand), Barrayaran Imperial Security (ImpSec) agent, Imperial Auditor (second in power only to the emperor of Barrayar) and eventually count of the Vorkosigan's District.
- Aral Vorkosigan is an admiral and, following the death of his father, Piotr Vorkosigan, one of 60 district counts. He meets Cordelia Naismith, a Betan Survey commander and nominal enemy, during the opening stage of Barrayar's war with Escobar; the two fall in love and, despite many obstacles, marry. Miles is their only (naturally born) child. A brilliant military strategist and leader, Aral extricates Barrayar's forces from a disastrous attack against Escobar. He reluctantly agrees to serve as regent for the orphaned young child emperor, Gregor Vorbarra. He and Cordelia raise Gregor with Miles. Despite his arduous responsibilities as regent, Aral sets aside time each day to spend with his fragile young son. When Emperor Gregor Vorbarra comes of age, Aral gratefully resigns his regency, but remains a force to be reckoned with. He and Cordelia are eventually appointed Viceroy and Vicereine of Sergyar, the planet where they first met.
- Cordelia Vorkosigan, née Naismith, is a native of technologically advanced and liberal Beta Colony. She is an elite Betan Astronomical Survey commander, leading the exploration of a new planet, when she becomes entangled with Barrayarans, among them Aral. Despite the initially hostile circumstances of their meeting, she travels to Barrayar and marries Aral. She plays a pivotal role in foiling a coup attempt against Gregor. In rescuing her unborn son (in a uterine replicator) from the rebels, she brings about the end not only of Vordarian's Pretendership, but also Count Vordarian himself.
- Piotr Vorkosigan is Aral's father. An experienced general, he was a leader of the guerrilla resistance to the Cetagandan occupation of Barrayar. He also played a pivotal role in deposing Mad Emperor Yuri in favor of Ezar Vorbarra, the grandfather of Gregor Vorbarra. Like nearly all Barrayarans, he hates mutants; he tries to persuade Cordelia to abort Miles after the antidote to the poison used in the failed assassination severely harms the fetus. After the boy is born, Piotr tries to have him killed as unfit to be count. Later, he comes around.
- Gregor Vorbarra becomes emperor of Barrayar after the death of his grandfather. He is orphaned as a child when his mother is killed during an attempted coup, his corrupt and debauched father having already died in the military debacle at Escobar.
- Konstantine Bothari is Miles' bodyguard from Miles' birth. Paranoid and homicidal, probably due to a horrific childhood, he is unwaveringly loyal to the Vorkosigans, especially Cordelia, who provide the moral framework he needs but lacks.
- Elena Bothari is Konstantine Bothari's daughter, the product of his rape of an Escobaran prisoner of war. She is raised with Miles, Gregor and Ivan Vorpatril. Elena is Miles' first love. She becomes an officer in the Dendarii Mercenary Fleet, before leaving to raise a family.
- Ivan Vorpatril is Miles' cousin. Handsome and intelligent, he is also indolent and seeks to avoid attention. He is Miles' closest friend and reluctant assistant in many of Miles' escapades.
- Alys Vorpatril is Ivan's mother. She serves as primary hostess for Emperor Gregor, when she is not trying to get her only offspring to marry.
- Simon Illyan is the head of Barrayaran Imperial Security (Impsec). When Captain Negri, the head of Impsec, is killed at the onset of Vordarian's coup attempt, Illyan is appointed his successor by Aral Vorkosigan. Later, he is pressured into becoming Miles' boss, to both his initial horror and later delight.
- Bazil "Baz" Jesek is a deserter from the Barrayaran military who becomes one of the first members of Miles' mercenary army, the Dendarii. He winds up the outfit's chief engineer. He and Elena marry and eventually leave for a more peaceful life.
- Ludmilla "Drou" Droushnakovi is a one-time bodyguard of Gregor Vorbara. She helps Cordelia end Vordarian's Pretendership. She later marries Kou Koudelka and raises four daughters.
- Klement "Kou" Koudelka is Aral's assistant during the latter's regency. Originally one of Aral's crew on Sergyar, he suffers a nerve disruptor blast, which leaves him partially disabled.
- Kareen Koudelka is the youngest of the four Koudelka children, all tall, beautiful blondes. During her year of education on Beta Colony, courtesy of Cordelia, she and Mark Vorkosigan (a clone of Miles created by enemies of Barrayar; see Jacksonians section below) become lovers, which causes her difficulty when she returns to Barrayar and its strict mores.
- Delia, Olivia, and Martya Koudelka, Kareen's older sisters, all beauties and trained in personal combat by their mother. Delia marries Duv Galeni, Olivia pairs off with Count Dono Vorrutyer, and Martya takes a liking to brilliant, but bumbling Escobaran scientist Enrique Borgos, Mark Vorkosigan's business partner.
- Ekaterin Vorsoisson comes to Miles' notice when, in his role as Imperial Auditor, he investigates what may be sabotage on Komarr. They are attracted to each other. After Ekaterin's emotionally abusive husband is killed, she returns to Barrayar. Miles, aware of her skittishness towards remarrying, "secretly" courts her, with near-disastrous results. Miles is faced with baseless accusations concerning her husband's death, and, to defuse the situation, she asks him to marry her in front of the entire Council of Counts. They have several children.
- Georg Vorthys is an Imperial Auditor, engineering expert and professor and Ekaterin's uncle. He and Miles investigate possible sabotage on Komarr. He is partially based on Bujold's father.
- Dr. Helen Vorthys is Georg's wife and a distinguished "Professora" in her own right.
- Byerly "By" Vorrutyer is an agent for Barrayaran Imperial Security, using his cover identity as a disreputable social gadfly.
- Lord Dono Vorrutyer, born as Lady Donna, the younger sister of the late Count Pierre Vorrutyer, seeks the vacant title, undergoing sex reassignment surgery on Beta Colony to bolster his bid. His confirmation by the other counts, and the intrigues of his cousin Richars who also wants the title, create much trouble for Miles and his intended fiancée Ekaterin.

== Dendarii ==
- Admiral Naismith is Miles Vorkosigan's cover identity. Miles invents Naismith to command his (unplanned and improvised on the fly) creation, the Dendarii Mercenaries. He eventually persuades Emperor Gregor Vorbarra and ImpSec head Illyan to accept the unit as a secret arm of the Barrayaran military, able to go where Barrayarans cannot and mount operations that cannot be traced back to Barrayar.
- Elli Quinn becomes Miles' second-in-command. She is also his lover, though she rejects Miles' many proposals that she become the next Lady Vorkosigan, as she detests the idea of being planet-bound. When Miles is no longer medically fit to lead the Dendarii, he names her his successor.
- Bel Thorne is a hermaphrodite from Beta Colony and a very capable Dendarii officer. Bel canonically uses it/its pronouns. It has an unrequited crush on Miles. When it goes along with a disastrous rescue mission conceived and led by Mark Vorkosigan, a clone of Miles masquerading as Naismith (see Jacksonians section below), Miles has no choice but to dismiss it from the Dendarii. They, however, are unexpectedly reunited for one more adventure.
- Ky Tung is a senior Dendarii captain. Initially a not-too-hostile enemy, he becomes Miles' mentor, before retiring to his native Earth.
- Admiral Yuan Oser is the commander of the Oseran Free Mercenary Fleet. However, he is outmaneuvered at every turn by Miles during the Tau Verde Ring War and gradually loses portions of his fleet and personnel to the Barrayaran, who transforms them into the Dendarii. He eventually concedes and joins the Dendarii. However, after Miles is absent for an unexpectedly long time, he manages to regain control of the fleet, only to quickly lose it again when Miles returns.
- Arde Mayhew is a starship jump pilot, one of Miles' first recruits.

== Cetagandans ==
- Emperor the haut Fletchir Giaja is the ruler of the Cetagandan Empire, which is composed of two castes. The ruling haut are engaged in ongoing genetic engineering to evolve their own people. The ghem serve the haut as military, police and minor aristocracy.
- The haut Rian Degtiar is a member of the Star Creche, the highest level of haut authority and responsible for the genetic modifications disseminated throughout the empire. When she crosses paths with Miles, he falls in love with her. She eventually becomes the empress of the empire.
- The haut Pel Navarr is another, older member of the Star Creche.
- Dag Benin, originally a ghem-colonel in security assigned to investigate Miles' involvement in Cetagandan intrigues, becomes a ghem-general and head of Cetagandan Imperial Security after he and Miles expose some dangerous conspirators.
- Terence Cee, or "Terran C", is the result of genetic engineering for telepathy by the Cetagandans. His ability manifests when he consumes large amounts of tyramine, a common derivative of an amino acid. Fleeing to Kline Station, he is sought by Elli Quinn from the Dendarii and the Cetagandans themselves, entangling Ethan Urquhart from Athos in the process.

== Escobarans ==
- Dr. Enrique Borgos is a brilliant, but socially inept scientist. Mark Vorkosigan becomes his business partner; Borgos develops "butter bugs", while Mark sets out to market them.

== Jacksonians ==
- Mark Pierre Vorkosigan is a clone of Miles created and raised on Jackson's Whole for exiled diehard Komarran resistance fighters determined to free their planet from Barrayaran control. He is painfully and repeatedly biosculpted to look exactly like Miles so he can replace his progenitor, poison Aral Vorkosigan and attempt to seize the throne. However, he rebels and kills his trainer, father figure and tormenter, Ser Galen. Miles eventually gives him a large sum of money and his freedom, to his bewilderment. Later, Mark botches a rescue of clones from Jackson's Whole, masquerading as Admiral Naismith to hijack some of the Dendarii to assist him. When Miles comes to the rescue, Miles is killed and his body is lost (though he is cryogenically frozen and later revived). Later, Mark locates Miles, but is captured by a vengeful Baron Ryoval. Mistaking Mark for Miles, he subjects him to tortures that cause him to develop multiple personalities as a defense: Gorge, Grunt, Howl and Killer. Killer emerges and kills Ryoval using the assassin's skills he learned from Ser Galen. It takes several attempts, but Miles manages to coax Mark into the Vorkosigan family fold. Mark, determined to distance himself as far as possible from Miles, turns his energies to entrepreneurship.
- Georish Stauber, Baron Fell, is the leader of one of the most powerful of the Great Houses that dominate Jackson's Whole. His business is mostly military.
- Ry Ryoval, Baron Ryoval, heads only a House Minor, but is accorded the respect of the leader of a Great House. His business is the creation of genetic freaks. He bears an intense grudge against Miles for the immense damage Miles inflicted on his genetic property and his resulting humiliation.
- Vasa Luigi, Baron Baraputra, commands another Great House. One of his businesses is the creation of clones of rich clients, into which their brains can be transplanted to give them a new life.
- The Duronas are a clan of clones, male and female, derived from Lilly, a brilliant scientist who heads a medical research organization staffed entirely by her clones, working for Baron Fell. As part of a deal with Fell, Mark purchases their freedom. They settle on Escobar, where they set up their own commercial operation.
- Taura is part of an unsuccessful attempt to create a super soldier. After Miles rescues her, she becomes a member of the Dendarii and Miles' occasional lover, despite her being 8 feet (2.4 m) tall to Miles' 4 feet 9 inches (1.45 m), and equipped with fangs. As a fail-safe, and partly because of her accelerated metabolism, she has a short lifespan, but the Dendarii medical staff are able to extend it somewhat.
- Hugo Canaba is a top research scientist working for Ryoval who defects to Barrayar, being given a new identity as Vaughn Weddell. During his extraction, Miles has to rescue Taura so Canaba can extract genetic material he implanted in her body. Later, Miles uses Canaba's expertise to help figure out who sabotaged a brain implant used by Simon Illyan, thereby incapacitating the security chief.

== Komarrans ==
- Duv Galeni, born David Galen, is one of the first Komarrans admitted into ImpSec. He first encounters Miles at the embassy on Earth where, unknown to him, his father Ser Galen has arranged to replace Miles with a clone.
- Ser Galen (Ser is a Komarran title, like "mister") is a fanatical Komarran resistance leader.
- Laisa Toscane is an heiress of a very wealthy Komarran family who attracts Gregor Vorbarra's attention when she is part of a trade delegation to Barrayar. Gregor marries her, much to the relief of many, as Gregor is the only ruler acceptable to all of Barrayar's factions.

== Quaddies ==
Quaddies are the result of genetic engineering to create humans who could live and work their entire lives in zero gravity. Instead of legs, they have an extra pair of arms, and metabolisms adjusted for their intended environment. After artificial gravity was invented, making them obsolete overnight, the corporation that created them scheduled them for either termination or imprisonment on a planetary surface, but they were rescued and eventually settled down at a remote star system known as Quaddiespace.

- Silver is one of the original quaddies. She becomes the lover of Leo Graf, the human engineer who masterminds the escape. He restructures the quaddie habitat for interstellar travel/escape from the company that created the quaddies. Their love story is celebrated in song and dance in Quaddiespace.
- Nicol is a quaddie employed on Jackson's Whole as a musician, playing an instrument resembling two xylophones with her four arms, while sitting in an anti-gravity chair. Rescued by Miles and the Dendarii at the same time as Taura and Hugo Canaba, she becomes a star entertainer in Quaddiespace and eventually the lover of Bel Thorne, the Betan hermaphrodite.

== Bibliography ==
- Carl, Lillian Stewart; Helfers, John (August 31, 2010). The Vorkosigan Companion. Baen. ISBN 9781439133798.
