= The Flowers of Vashnoi =

Short story by Lois McMaster Bujold

"The Flowers of Vashnoi" is a 2018 science fiction novella by Lois McMaster Bujold, part of her Vorkosigan Saga. It was first published by Subterranean Press.

== Synopsis ==
When Ekaterin Vorkosigan and Enrique Borgos test Enrique's genetically engineered insects (modified "butter bugs" from A Civil Campaign) for the bioremediation of the radioactive wasteland surrounding the former site of the city of Vorkosigan Vashnoi, they discover that the area is not deserted as they had thought.

== Reception ==
Publishers Weekly praised the novella as "enjoyable" and "savory", noting that Ekaterin is "as formidable, whip-smart, and compassionate as her husband". AudioFile, reviewing the audio version, considered that "(t)he plot is not terribly complicated", but emphasized that "like most of the [Vorkosigan] series, [it] is character driven", and lauded Bujold's "sardonic humor". Tulsa Book Review described it as "heartwarming" and a "gentle elaboration of the complexities of Barrayaran history and culture", while warning that a true appreciation of the text requires a familiarity with Bujold's oeuvre. Tor.com commended Bujold's increased focus on Enrique and her reuse of Ekaterin as a viewpoint character, observing that the story is "all about redemption".

James Nicoll declared it to be "enjoyable entertainment" and "a pleasing way to fill an hour", but also "slight [and] short" and "[m]ore of an anecdote than a story;" Nicoll also questioned the likelihood of Ekaterin being able to successfully rehabilitate the children, and noted that it was "(p)robably for the best that the story focuses on the short-term issues."
