= Captain Vorpatril's Alliance =

2012 science fiction novel by Lois McMaster Bujold

- Author: Lois McMaster Bujold
- Audio read by: Grover Gardner
- Cover artist: Dave Seeley
- Language: English
- Series: Vorkosigan Saga
- Genre: Science fiction
- Publisher: Baen Books
- Publication date: November 6, 2012 (hardcover) (e-book was sold from June 2012)
- Publication place: United States
- Media type: Print (hardcover), e-book
- Pages: 422
- ISBN: 978-1-4516-3845-5 (hardcover)
- LC Class: PS3552.U397C37
- Preceded by: Cryoburn
- Followed by: Gentleman Jole and the Red Queen

Captain Vorpatril's Alliance is a science fiction novel by American writer Lois McMaster Bujold, part of the Vorkosigan Saga. The action centers on Miles Vorkosigan's cousin Ivan Vorpatril, now a captain, and a Jackson's Whole refugee called Tej. By internal chronology, the book is set a year or so after Diplomatic Immunity (2002), about four years before Cryoburn (2010).

== Plot ==
During a stay on the planet Komarr, Captain Ivan Vorpatril is recruited by Byerly Vorrutyer, an undercover agent of Imperial Security, to find out the real identity of a young woman named Tej, connected to his investigation, whom he believes may be in danger.

Ivan visits her workplace and flirts with her, asking her on a date, but is rejected. After he follows her back to her building, she lets him into her apartment, where he is ambushed by her companion, a genetically modified woman named Rish. He spends the night tied to a chair in their apartment while they decide what to do with him. When two men break in, Ivan manages to alert the women, who stun the intruders. Ivan then offers his own flat as a safe place for them.

The women's persecutors accuse them of illegally entering Komarr and simultaneously accuse Ivan of kidnapping them, using the police investigation of these crimes to track them. A few days later, while the police force their way into his apartment, Ivan hastily marries Tej and hires Rish as her employee to give them legal protection.

Tej reveals that she is the youngest daughter of Baron Cordonah from Jackson's Whole, a planet based on laissez-faire free market economics where what would be crimes elsewhere abound. House Cordonah had been recently taken over by force by a competitor, who put a price on the remaining members of the House, making bounty hunters track them all the way to Komarr. Now as part of the family of a high Vor lord, Tej and Rish travel with Ivan to Barrayar.

Back on Barrayar, Rish gets involved romantically with Byerly. Tej and Ivan attempt to get a divorce by petition to Count Falco Vorpatril, but are rejected. Falco tells Ivan that he will have to face the consequences of his own actions for a change. Ivan and Tej begin developing feelings for each other.

Then the surviving members of Tej's family arrive unexpectedly. They have come to Barrayar to acquire the financial resources needed to attempt to take back their House. Tej's grandmother, a former Cetagandan haut lady, knows of an underground bunker forgotten since the Cetagandan invasion of Barrayar had been defeated a century before. It is filled with looted treasure, but they discover that Imperial Security's headquarters was inadvertently built just across the street from where the bunker is buried. They use a genetically modified fungus to dig their way into the bunker without alerting Imperial Security (ImpSec). Just as they are ready to enter the bunker, Ivan figures out the scheme and confronts Tej, who manages to secure his help. The scheme falls apart when the smuggler the baron had hired to transport the treasure trove proves to be more interested in the bounties on the family, and in the confrontation a long-forgotten buried bomb explodes, trapping them all in the bunker.

While the bunker is flooding, Ivan and Tej confess their mutual feelings for each other and resolve to stay together. Barrayaran Imperial forces rescue them, but the foundations of ImpSec Headquarters are compromised, and the building partially sinks into the ground. Emperor Gregor negotiates a deal with Baron Cordonah: in exchange for one tenth of the bunker's contents and a ship to return to Jackson's Whole, House Cordonah becomes a covert ally of Barrayar.

Byerly is exiled to Jackson's Whole with the Cordonahs, while Ivan is assigned as a diplomatic aide to planet Ylla. The book ends with Ivan and Tej reading letters from their families and planning their future.

== Reception ==
Captain Vorpatril's Alliance was a finalist for the 2013 Hugo Award for Best Novel. At Tor.com, Jo Walton described it as "adorable as a whole", "deeply readable and tons of fun", and "also a really remarkably good science fiction novel", comparing it to Georgette Heyer's Cotillion, while at Locus Online, Paul Di Filippo compared it to a Gilbert and Sullivan farce, and to a "lighthearted and absurd" version of the works of C. J. Cherryh, complimenting Bujold's execution in alternating the viewpoint between Ivan and Tej. The SF Site's Steven H Silver, conversely, felt that the alternating viewpoint was not executed as well as it could have been, and that Ivan "makes a better support[ing] character than a primary character"; Silver conceded, however, that Ivan and Tej may "seem less than dynamic merely in comparison to Bujold's more typical protagonists".

== Publication history ==
Bujold began writing the novel in November 2009, but was interrupted by medical issues. In December 2010, she deleted the last five chapters and rewrote them with the "(s)ame characters, but a different location, (which) made all the difference."

From June 2012, the book was sold as a non-proofread advance reader e-book (e-ARC). The official print release was November 2012.
