= The Mountains of Mourning =

Novella by Lois McMaster Bujold

The Mountains of Mourning is a science fiction novella by American author Lois McMaster Bujold. It is part of her Vorkosigan Saga, chronologically taking place between the novels The Warrior's Apprentice and The Vor Game. It won the 1990 Hugo Award for Best Novella and the Nebula Award for Best Novella of 1989.

The novella debuted in 1989 in Analog Science Fiction and Fact. It was later collected in the omnibus editions Vorkosigan's Game; Young Miles; and Borders of Infinity.

== Plot summary ==
Miles has just graduated from the Imperial Academy, and is at home at Vorkosigan Surleau with his parents. A woman from an isolated rural village demands justice for the murder of her baby, who was born with a cleft lip and palate, but was otherwise healthy. Miles' father sends him to investigate as his Voice (representative with full powers) to gain experience. Miles solves the mystery and exercises justice and mercy in appropriate measures.

== Reception ==
The Mountains of Mourning won the 1990 Hugo Award for Best Novella and the Nebula Award for Best Novella of 1989.
