= Cetaganda =

1996 novel by Lois McMaster Bujold

- Cover of the first edition
- Author: Lois McMaster Bujold
- Audio read by: Grover Gardner
- Cover artist: Gary Ruddell
- Language: English
- Series: Vorkosigan Saga
- Genre: Science fiction
- Publisher: Baen Books
- Publication date: 1996
- Publication place: United States
- Pages: 302
- ISBN: 0-671-87701-1
- Preceded by: Mirror Dance
- Followed by: Memory

Cetaganda is a science fiction novel by Lois McMaster Bujold, first published in four parts from October to December 1995 in Analog Science Fiction and Fact, and published in book form by Baen Books in January 1996. It is a part of the Vorkosigan Saga, and was included in the 2001 omnibus Miles, Mystery and Mayhem.

== Plot summary ==
Previous novels referred to the Cetagandan Empire because of its occupation of Barrayar decades before the events of the first novel, Shards of Honor. Cetagandan soldiers of the ghem military class appear in The Warrior's Apprentice, Ethan of Athos and Brothers in Arms. This novel introduces the haut ruling class of the Empire. The haut have different long-range goals than their ghem underlings.

Miles and Ivan are sent to the home world of the Cetagandan Empire to represent Barrayar at the state funeral of the dowager Empress Lisbet, mother of the current emperor, the haut Fletchir Giaja. They quickly become entangled in an internal Cetagandan plot when they arrive at a nearly deserted docking bay, much to their puzzlement. A ba (a sexless servant of the Cetagandan rulers) unexpectedly rushes into their spaceship. A struggle ensues, in which the ba drops a weapon and some sort of artifact before fleeing. Miles takes it upon himself to investigate — without informing his superiors — and eventually discovers that the artifact is a fake copy of the priceless Great Key, which has been stolen. The ba is later found dead.

Realizing that an unknown enemy is trying to frame him and Barrayar, Miles forms an unusual alliance with the haut Rian Degtiar, the "Handmaiden of the Star Crèche", who is charged with the duties of empress until the new one is chosen. The Star Crèche is the heart of the genetic engineering project that is the haut class's efforts to evolve beyond the merely human.

Miles solves the complex mystery and stops a plot to fragment the Cetagandan Empire into eight dangerously expansionist-minded parts, a plot which itself is hijacked by one of the haut governors for personal gain, abetted by a renegade haut lady and his top ghem general. Much to his chagrin, he is publicly awarded the Order of Merit, one of the very highest Cetagandan honors, by the Emperor himself. He also picks up clues to a Cetagandan genetic experiment, which becomes the object of much skullduggery in Ethan of Athos.

== Reception ==
Cetaganda was nominated for the Locus Award in 1997, the same year as Memory, the following book in the series. SF Site praised the novel as having "a good and delicious mystery at its core". At Tor.com, Jo Walton noted that she didn't consider "the Cetagandan political set-up to be very plausible, [or] very interesting"; Walton also observed that, although the previous three Vorkosigan novels all won the Hugo Award for Best Novel, Cetaganda was not even nominated. SFF.net found it to be "certainly an enjoyable book, though not (Bujold's) best."

== Reviews ==
- Backstab #11
