= Playaway =

Portable media player for use in libraries

Playaway is a brand of portable media players designed for circulation in libraries by Playaway Products, LLC, based in Solon, Ohio. The format is used in institutional lending, such as in public and school libraries. Playaway's library Web site states that it is currently available in over 25,000 schools and libraries. The devices have also been used by the United States military to give troops access to audiobooks overseas.

Penguin Random House acquired Playaway in 2023.

== Playaway Audiobooks ==
Playaway audiobook device. Headphones shown for size reference.

Playaway is a solid-state prerecorded audio player introduced in 2005 and redesigned in 2016. About the size of a deck of playing cards and weighing 2 ounces (57 g), it can store up to 80 hours of audio. As of March 2010, the audiobooks are all produced in high-definition audio.

The digital content (audiobook or music compilation) is preloaded at the factory and cannot easily be changed or copied by the end user. A 3.5 mm stereo jack provides output to earphones or an external amplifier. Playaway Light was explicitly designed to use the most commonly available cassette adaptors and FM transmitters. Power is provided by a changeable 1.5V AAA cell, which the manufacturer claims allows it to operate approximately 20 hours before battery depletion, 30 hours for the newer versions. There are about 15,000 titles on Playaway, generally priced in line with the publisher's suggested library pricing for the CD equivalent. As of 2013, the newest Playaway versions feature HD Audio and high-definition sound. These new units enable users to lock the keypad and slow down reading speed. In 2016, Playaway added a backlit LCD screen with more details and simplified the button layout.

== Wonderbook ==
Wonderbook is a print book with an audio player permanently attached to the inside cover. It includes a "read-along mode" for reading along with the print book, as well as a "learning mode" which asks questions about the book. There is also a "Sing-Along" storybook version.

== Playaway Launchpad ==
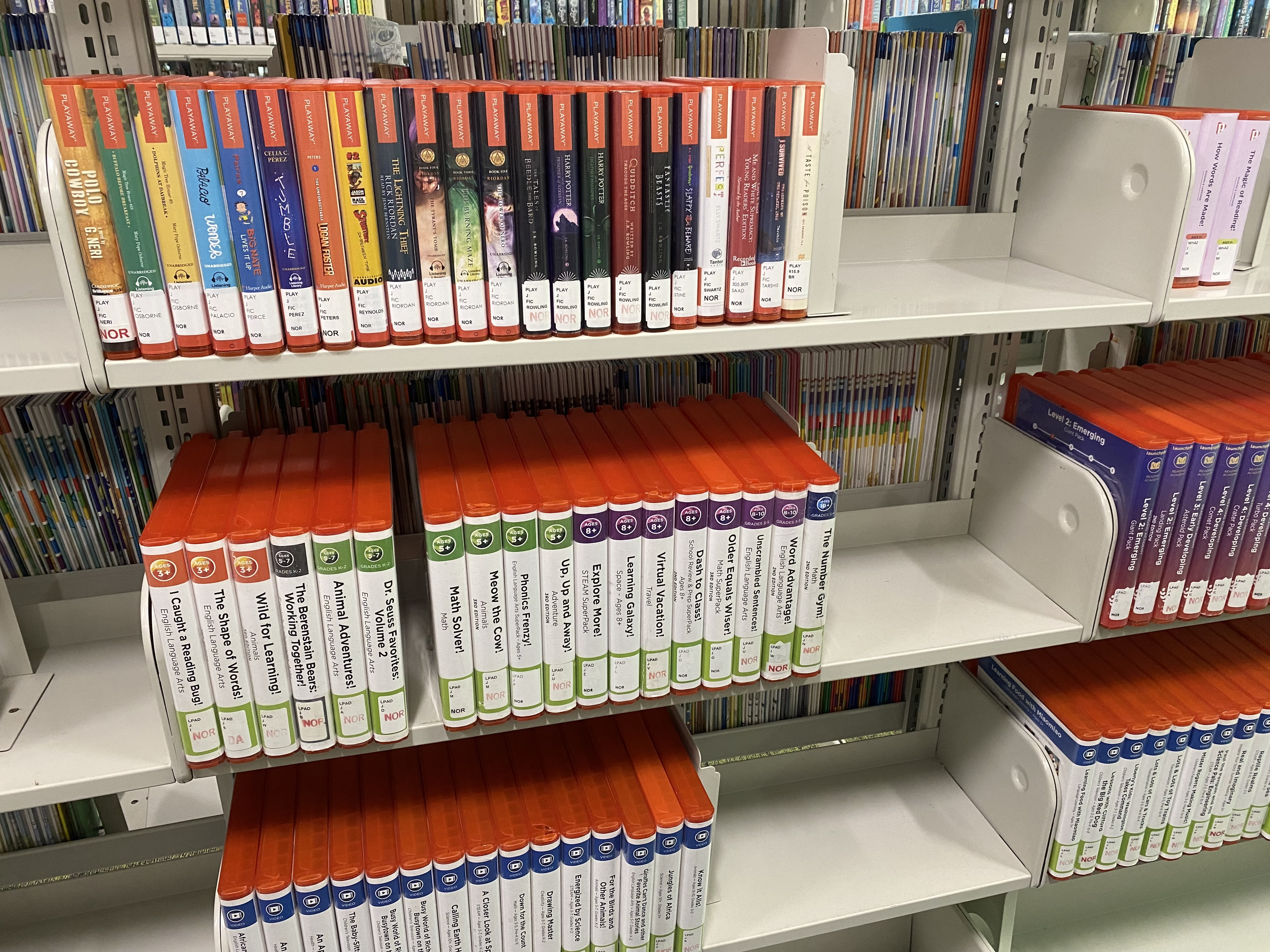
Playaway Launchpads and audiobooks at a Florida library

Playaway Launchpad is a modified Android tablet pre-loaded with games and other educational apps. Each tablet comes pre-loaded with several apps that have a shared subject. There is no way for end users to add or remove apps.

== Playaway View ==
Playaway View was a portable video player. The content was pre-loaded and could not be modified by the end user. Selections included popular movies and television shows for children and adults, documentaries, and educational content. Children's books could be played in a moving picture style with narration. They have been discontinued in favor of Launchpad.
