= Cryoburn =

2010 novel by Lois McMaster Bujold

- Author: Lois McMaster Bujold
- Audio read by: Grover Gardner
- Cover artist: David Seeley
- Language: English
- Series: Vorkosigan Saga
- Genre: Science fiction
- Publisher: Baen Books
- Publication date: October 19, 2010
- Publication place: United States
- Pages: 345
- ISBN: 978-1-4391-3394-1
- Preceded by: Diplomatic Immunity
- Followed by: Captain Vorpatril's Alliance

Cryoburn is a science fiction novel by American writer Lois McMaster Bujold, first published in October 2010. Part of the Vorkosigan Saga, it explores the long-term societal effects of cryonics. Bujold has called it "an extended meditation on death."

== Synopsis ==
Some years after the events of Diplomatic Immunity, Miles Vorkosigan is sent by Emperor Gregor to the planet Kibou-daini ("New Hope") to investigate White Chrysanthemum Cryonics Corporation. WhiteChrys, a major "cryocorp", to which sick or dying people go to be frozen in hopes of one day being revived and cured, is opening a subsidiary on Komarr, arousing suspicions. The narrative follows three points of view: those of Miles, his Armsman Roic, and Jin Sato, a local Kibou-daini boy. At a conference, an attempt is made to kidnap Miles and the other attendees. Miles avoids capture because an allergic reaction to the drug used on him makes him extremely hyperactive, and escapes into the below-ground Cryocombs, where the frozen are stored. Roic is caught along with Raven, a cryo-revival specialist from the Durona Group who assisted in reviving Miles after his death on Jackson's Whole (detailed in Mirror Dance).

When Miles finds his way back to the surface, he encounters Jin, an eleven-year-old boy living with his chickens and other pets in a disused building. Jin introduces him to a society of outcasts living in abandoned facilities. This helps Miles piece together what is really going on.

== Publication history ==
Lois Bujold announced the name of the book on her blog: "My editor, playing the part of the Supreme Court, has kindly cast the deciding vote in this close election: the new Miles book shall henceforth be known as CryoBurn." The other two choices under consideration were Cold Breath and Cryopolis.

Bujold read the first two chapters at Denvention 3 in August 2008. The full-length electronic Advance Reader Copy was made available through Webscriptions on August 3, 2010. The hardcover version of Cryoburn also comes with a CD-ROM containing E-Book versions of the omnibus editions of the Vorkosigan Saga.

== Reception ==
Cryoburn was a finalist for the Hugo Award for Best Novel in 2011, Bujold's ninth Best Novel nomination. It was also one of the top five finishers in the poll for the 2011 Locus Award for Best Science Fiction Novel.

At the SF Site, Rich Horton described it as "a fun read" with "a satisfying science fictional aspect", but "ultimately pretty minor work," in which "Miles (...) is a curiously muted figure."

At Reactor, Liz Bourke called it "damn entertaining", with "themes of mortality and the fear thereof [that] mesh well with the character and concerns of an older Miles", but nonetheless found it to be "less a book about Miles than one through which Miles passes", and one whose "endgame felt rushed and incomplete", particularly observing that "Kibou-daini doesn’t matter to Miles the same way Barrayar or Komarr does."

At Black Gate, James Enge praised Bujold's characterization, especially her portrayal of Jin and the aftermath of his being shot by Roic, but noted that of the two primary plot threads, the one involving corporate malfeasance and Komarr is "too administrative in nature to make for a dramatic story", while the one involving Kibou-Daini internal unrest is "more interesting, but Miles doesn’t really have a place in it, except as a catalyst. Most of that will take place in his absence."

At Strange Horizons, Kelly Jennings was more critical, calling it "a wacky romantic comedy set on a planet, we are told, an inch away from revolution and economic shutdown", which "should have been a lot darker." Jennings commended the novel's many depictions of "economic injustice", but felt that "Bujold doesn't seriously engage with the situation she's created, and no solution, or even any real critique, is given for either the economic problems of Kibou-daini or for the philosophical failings regarding death which have caused this economic disaster;" as well, she considered that "Miles treat[s] Jin like a tool he's going to use and leave behind", and emphasized that although the novel does include characters "who speak up for the poor and ignorant (...) very little page space or attention is given to them or their efforts or goals."
