= Gentleman Jole and the Red Queen =

Novel by Lois McMaster Bujold

- Author: Lois McMaster Bujold
- Audio read by: Grover Gardner
- Cover artist: Ron Miller
- Language: English
- Series: Vorkosigan Saga
- Genre: Science fiction
- Publisher: Baen Books
- Publication date: 2 February 2016 (eARC sold from October 2015)
- Publication place: United States
- Media type: E-book, print
- ISBN: 9781476781228
- Preceded by: Cryoburn

Gentleman Jole and the Red Queen is a science fiction novel by American writer Lois McMaster Bujold. It is an installment in Bujold's Vorkosigan Saga. Bujold has described it as "not a war story. It is about grownups."

The concept for the cover art was designed by Bujold herself.

The eARC was released for sale by Baen Books on October 21, 2015. The paper edition was published in February 2016.

== Plot summary ==
Three years after the death of Aral Vorkosigan, Admiral Oliver Jole of the Sergyar Fleet (Aral's long-time subordinate and lover) receives a proposal. After returning from Barrayar, Aral's widow Cordelia Naismith Vorkosigan announces that she intends to have several new children using stored genetic material from herself and Aral. She also offers Jole the chance to have children of his own, likewise created from the genes of Jole and Aral.

== Reception ==
At Ars Technica, Annalee Newitz declared it to be "one of the most realistic and funny novels you'll ever read about space colonization", while Tor.com's Ellen Cheeseman-Meyer observed that it would be a fitting conclusion, both to Cordelia's character arc and to the Vorkosigan universe as a whole. Publishers Weekly considered it "droll" and "enjoyable", and compared it to the works of Jane Austen, but noted that it was "more comforting than exciting" and would "work best for readers who don’t expect interstellar derring-do."
