= The Spirit Ring =

Novel by Lois McMaster Bujold

- First edition
- Author: Lois McMaster Bujold
- Cover artist: Stephen Hickman
- Language: English
- Genre: Fantasy novel
- Publisher: (Baen)
- Publication date: November 1992
- Publication place: United States
- Media type: Print Hardbound & Paperback & E-Book
- Pages: 367 pp (first edition, hardbound)
- LC Class: PZ7.B91114 Sp 1992

The Spirit Ring is a 1992 historical fantasy by Lois McMaster Bujold based on Agricola's De re metallica. It was combined with the folkloric tradition of the grateful dead and the life of Benvenuto Cellini.

== Plot ==
Set in the fictional Italian city-state of Montefoglia, The Spirit Ring follows 15-year-old Fiametta, daughter of a master metalworker and magician, Prospero Beneforte. He indulges her wish to learn to make magical items of metal, though it is not generally viewed as appropriate for her gender.

At the beginning of the story, Fiametta casts a lion's-head ring with a love spell that aims to identify a 'true heart'. The young girl is chagrined when the heart selected by the spell belongs to a young Swiss miner named Thur Ochs. Thur came to Montefoglia to work as an apprentice to Prospero Beneforte, a position secured by his brother, Uri.

Uri is killed in the fight when Duke Sandrino is usurped by an ambitious mercenary leader, Lord Ferrante. Ferrante's magician, Vitelli, pickles Uri's body in salt for future use in making a ring of power — the spirit ring of the book's title. Fiametta and her father manage to escape but are followed by Ferrante's men. Prospero dies of a heart attack while holding the attackers back to let Fiametta escape, and his body eventually is added to that of Uri as a resource for ring-making.

The story then follows Fiametta, Thur, and the local Abbot as they find out Lord Ferrante's plans and invent ways to block them. The grandest of these countermeasures is the use of a larger-than-life Perseus statue cast in bronze, though by the time of his death, Master Beneforte's masterpiece had only reached the wax model stage. After the casting and the voluntary investment in the spirit of Uri Ochs, the invincible soldier is able to lead a rabble of townspeople into the castle to kill Lord Ferrante just before the statue cools to immobility. The Abbot manages to shrive the spirits of the assorted casualties of the concluding battle. Fiametta manages to unmake the ring, and Master Beneforte in spirit form helps end the career of Vitelli.

== Reception ==
Publishers Weekly praised it as "enthralling, crisply paced and fully developed", while the SF Site called it "Bujold at her storytelling best" and "a fine and stirring yarn".

Infinity Plus stated that it has "good writing, decent plot, engaging characters, and the logical, well put-together world", but found it to be "somehow lacking a certain snap that Bujold has consistently brought to her Science Fiction". At Tor.com, Jo Walton noted that she "ought to like the book more", emphasizing that it had "wonderful ingredients", having "intellectual admiration" for it, and it would be easy to discuss the book "in a way that really made it sound amazing by dwelling on the things that are amazing". However, she ultimately concluded that "there's no spark", and Bujold had "written books that were so much better".
