= Komarr =

1998 novel by Lois McMaster Bujold

- Cover of the first edition
- Author: Lois McMaster Bujold
- Audio read by: Grover Gardner
- Language: English
- Series: Vorkosigan Saga
- Genre: Science fiction
- Publisher: Baen Books
- Publication date: 1998
- Publication place: United States
- ISBN: 978-0671017835
- Preceded by: Memory
- Followed by: A Civil Campaign

Komarr is a 1998 science fiction novel by Lois McMaster Bujold. It is a part of the Vorkosigan Saga, and is the twelfth full-length novel in publication order. It was included in the 2008 omnibus Miles in Love. It won the Minnesota Book Award (1999).

== Plot summary ==
In his new role as Imperial Auditor, Miles Vorkosigan finds himself on Komarr, a planet where his father has an unfortunate reputation, being blamed for a massacre of government officials who had surrendered to him during the planet's conquest. He is there, along with Professor Vorthys, an older, more experienced Auditor and engineer, to investigate whether the destruction of a solar power satellite vital to the ongoing terraforming of the planet was an accident or sabotage.

Miles uncovers an extremely dangerous Komarran conspiracy, one which threatens the entire Barrayaran Empire, and is attracted to Vorthys's niece, Ekaterin Vorsoisson, the unhappy wife of an Etienne "Tien" Vorsoisson, an engineer at one of the terraforming facilities. Tien suffers from a degenerative genetic condition, which would stigmatize him with other Barrayarans, and has tried to raise money for secret treatment by gambling on the Komarran financial markets. Heavily in debt, he has been bribed to ignore certain irregularities, which he believes are just a swindle, but are actually part of the plot against Barrayar.

Tien Vorsoisson and Miles stumble upon the conspirators and are captured. They are left shackled and outside in the noxious Komarran atmosphere with only their breathing masks to sustain them, but Tien neglected to recharge his mask's air supply and suffocates. Ekaterin finds her husband dead and Miles injured from his efforts to come to Tien's aid. She had been about to leave the marriage, having discovered Tien's gambling losses, but received a mysterious call to pick up Miles and Tien at the remote facility.

Miles and Vorthys recruit a renowned Komarran physicist to try to figure out what the plotters have built, based on their purchases. They deduce the cabal seeks to isolate Barrayar by closing its only wormhole, but the Komarran expert believes that the device would not work as intended, but would return a gravity pulse that would destroy the device. A test of the device shattered the spaceship it was on, and the debris destroyed the satellite.

Ekaterin travel to an orbiting station to meet Vorthys's wife, the "Professora", Ekaterin's favorite relative. The pair accidentally encounter one of the conspirators who have gone to the station to launch their plot. They are taken prisoner. By the time Miles arrives, Barrayaran Security has the plotters under siege, but Ekaterin and the Professora are hostages. After persuading the Komarrans to surrender, Miles is surprised and utterly delighted to discover that Ekaterin has a previously hidden talent for causing mayhem and had already dealt the plot a fatal blow.

Miles bids farewell to Ekaterin before returning to Barrayar to report to Emperor Gregor. Their relationship develops further in the next novel, A Civil Campaign.

In a departure from the style of previous Vorkosigan books, the point of view is split between Miles and Ekaterin, offering an outside view on Miles.

== Reception ==
Publishers Weekly called it "a fast-moving story that combines just the right amount of action and wit", and considered the portrayal of Ekaterin as "a good woman stuck in a loveless marriage" to be "both believable and intensely painful".

At Tor.com, Jo Walton stated that Komarr is "a perfect mystery, with all the clues in plain sight (...) but cleverly misdirected", and commended Bujold's portrayal of "plausible villains who think of themselves as heroes". At the SF Site, Nicki Gerlach praised the depiction of an abusive relationship, noting in particular that Ekaterin's reasons for remaining with Tien ("other than inertia") are "not only believable, but also contribute to [her] overall characterization and likability."
