= A Civil Campaign =

1999 science fiction novel by Lois McMaster Bujold

- Cover of the first edition
- Author: Lois McMaster Bujold
- Audio read by: Grover Gardner
- Cover artist: Patrick Turner
- Language: English
- Series: Vorkosigan Saga
- Genre: Science fiction
- Published: 1999 (Baen Books)
- Publication place: United States
- Media type: Print
- Pages: 405
- ISBN: 978-0-671-57827-5
- Preceded by: Komarr
- Followed by: Diplomatic Immunity

A Civil Campaign: A Comedy of Biology and Manners (Note: The subtitle "A Comedy of Biology and Manners" does not appear in the eBook editions of this book.) is a science fiction novel by American writer Lois McMaster Bujold, first published in September 1999. It is a part of the Vorkosigan Saga, and is the thirteenth full-length novel in publication order. It is included in the 2008 omnibus Miles in Love. The title is an homage to the Georgette Heyer novel A Civil Contract and, like Heyer's historical romances, the novel focuses on romance, comedy, and courtship. It is dedicated to "Jane, Charlotte, Georgette, and Dorothy", novelists Jane Austen, Charlotte Brontë, Georgette Heyer, and Dorothy L. Sayers.

== Plot summary ==
Romance is in the air on Barrayar as Emperor Gregor's imperial marriage to Laisa Toscane approaches. Miles Vorkosigan wants to woo Ekaterin Vorsoisson, recently widowed (when Miles foiled a terrorist plot on Komarr), but fears that openly courting her so soon after the death of her husband would drive her away. He takes an indirect approach: he hires her to design a garden beside Vorkosigan House so he can spend time with her.

His clone brother Mark also has romance problems. He and Kareen Koudelka, one of the daughters of a very close friend of Miles' mother, became lovers at Beta Colony, but the sexual mores of conservative Barrayar are much stricter, and she both keeps their relationship a secret from her family while declining any amorous activities on Barrayar. When Kareen's parents finally learn the truth, they take it very badly. Miles recommends his brother involve their mother, the formidable Lady Vorkosigan. She persuades Kareen's parents to accept their relationship.

A significant subplot involves Mark's latest entrepreneurial venture: a disgusting-looking genetically engineered insect called the "butter bug," capable of eating all kinds of waste organic material of Earth origin and regurgitating a nutritious goo that Miles disparagingly calls "bug vomit". Enrique Borgos, the genius scientist who created the bugs, causes numerous chaotic incidents due to his inept social skills, such as creating bugs with the Vorkosigan livery and crest that escape to cause havoc, messy overflowing bug butter vats, interplanetary legal complications, and strife among the residents of Vorkosigan House.

Meanwhile, two seats on the powerful Council of Counts are up for grabs: Count Rene Vorbretten has been found to be part Cetagandan, dating back to the brutal Cetagandan occupation of Barrayar, meaning he is not a legitimate descendant of the previous counts; and Count Pierre Vorrutyer had not named a successor before he died. His vacant seat is being contested by his (at the time of Count Pierre's death) closest male relative, cousin Richars, and Pierre's sister Lady Donna, who secretly undergoes gender reassignment surgery on Beta Colony to become a man, Lord Dono. Lady Donna had previously ably managed the district for her brother. Miles gets involved in the behind-the-scenes scheming on behalf of Count Vorbretten and Lord Dono Vorrutyer after Richars tries to blackmail Miles with false accusations.

Miles' cousin Lord Ivan Vorpatril gets dragged into the various intrigues. Initially excited to become reacquainted with former lover Lady Donna, he is stunned to discover she is now a man, but nevertheless helps him in his efforts to become the next Count Vorrutyer. Ivan also expresses some interest in Ekaterin Vorsoisson; when Miles manipulates him into leaving her alone, he decides to have some fun (and revenge for all the other times Miles has used him) by spreading the word that Ekaterin is a highly desirable widow (in a world where men seriously outnumber women due to the widespread adoption of sex selection of offspring).

Miles cannot stop himself from informing several people close to him about his secret courtship. This proves to be a colossal blunder. He hosts a dinner party to introduce Ekaterin to his friends, at which his secret is inadvertently revealed to all, causing Miles to panic and propose. A furious Ekaterin leaves. His political enemies seize this opportunity to spread the rumor that Miles killed Etienne Vorsoisson, and because of the top secret nature of the Komarran plot foiled by Miles and Ekaterin (as detailed in Komarr), he cannot defend himself.

On the eve of the voting for both countships, Richars sends his henchmen to castrate his rival, but the attempt is foiled by Ivan Vorpatril and Olivia Koudelka. The next day, when the plot is revealed to the council of counts before the voting for both seats, Richars loses the support of the leaders of the conservative faction, who are annoyed, not by the attempted crime, but by his bungling of it. Richars loses the vote and Lord Dono becomes Count Dono. Foiled, Richars addresses the Council of Counts, accusing Miles of killing Etienne Vorsoisson. This provokes Ekaterin, watching from the audience, into publicly proposing to Miles, which he instantly accepts. Count Rene also retains his title.

The various romantic threads are resolved: Emperor Gregor of Barrayar's wedding goes off without a hitch; Martya Koudelka becomes involved with Enrique Borgos; Olivia Koudelka becomes engaged to Count Dono; Kareen gets her parents to agree she and Mark each have a year's "option" on each other and can explore their relationship openly; and Ivan's mother's relationship with former ImpSec head Simon Ilyan is grudgingly accepted by Ivan.

== Reception ==
A Civil Campaign was a finalist for the 2000 Hugo Award for Best Novel, the 2000 Nebula Award for Best Novel and the 2000 Locus Award for Best Science Fiction Novel.

Publishers Weekly called the novel "sprightly" and "enormously satisfying", lauding Bujold's ability to combine "quirky humor, (...) just enough action, a dab of feminist social commentary and her usual superb character development " Kirkus Reviews described it as "(i)nviting if sometimes overembellished folderol, with an agreeable sense of humor".

The SF Site (reviewing the audiobook) lauded it as an excellent example of a Regency romance within science fiction, with "absolutely wonderful character moments for everybody, not just the romantic leads", and "one of the best love letters (...) this side of Persuasion". Infinity Plus praised Bujold's "subtle plotting and genuine wit", calling it "truly superior farce, rich with incident and characters" and faulting it only for the extent to which it benefits from a familiarity with the previous Vorkosigan novels.

Cheryl Morgan, analyzing the novel's approach to transgender issues, noted that "the nice characters in the book react positively to Dono, whereas the nasty characters recoil in horror", but stated that he is "a very unconvincing portrait of a trans person". In particular, Morgan emphasized that "(t)here's no suggestion that [Donna] wants to be a man for any reasons other than to secure the title [of Count], and for intellectual curiosity", and that "(f)or [Dono], changing gender is just a lifestyle choice." Aside from this "one very important caveat", however, Morgan found the novel to be "a lot of fun" and "remarkably readable".
