= Vorkosigan Saga =

Science fiction book series by Lois McMaster Bujold

The Vorkosigan Saga
- Cover of Shards of Honor, the first book in the series.
- Author: Lois McMaster Bujold
- Country: United States
- Language: English
- Genre: Science fiction, space opera, romance
- Publisher: Baen Books
- Published: 1986 – ongoing
- Media type: Print (hardcover and paperback), audiobook, e-book
- No. of books: 16 & 6 short works (List of books)

The Vorkosigan Saga is a series of science fiction novels and short stories set in a common fictional universe by American author Lois McMaster Bujold. The first of these was published in 1986 and the most recent in May 2018. Works in the series have received numerous awards and nominations, including five Hugo Award wins including one for Best Series.

The point of view characters include women (Cordelia in Shards of Honor, Barrayar, and Gentleman Jole and the Red Queen; Ekaterin in Komarr, A Civil Campaign, and The Flowers of Vashnoi), a gay man (Ethan of Athos), a pair of brothers, one of whom is physically disabled and the other a clone (Miles and Mark Vorkosigan), and their cousin (Ivan Vorpatril), together with some minor characters (e.g., Miles's bodyguard Roic, family friend Kareen Koudelka, and the runaway Jin).

The various forms of society and government Bujold presents often reflect contemporary politics. In many novels, there is a contrast between the technology-rich egalitarian Beta Colony (or more generally, galactic society) and the heroic, militaristic, hierarchical society of Barrayar, where personal relationships must ensure societal continuity. Miles Vorkosigan, the protagonist of most of the series, is the son of a Betan former ship captain mother and a Barrayaran aristocrat father.

== Background ==
=== "Vorkosiverse" ===
Humanity has colonized a galaxy in which there are no competing intelligent species. Since then (at least 400 years before Falling Free or 600 years before Shards of Honor), dozens of planets have been colonized and have developed divergent cultures. Barrayar was colonized and then lost contact with the rest of the galaxy, suffering a "Time of Isolation", after which it was reconnected. Due to apparent nuclear warfare that has left large areas too radioactive to inhabit, low genetic diversity on Barrayar during the time of isolation, as well as the effects of mutagenic compounds found in native Barrayaran plants, a cultural phobia about mutation developed that leads to a high level of xenophobia. Within the series, exploration and colonization of new planets is still ongoing, most notably on the planet Sergyar.

Interstellar travel is achieved by "jumping" from solar system to solar system via spatial anomalies known as wormholes that create tunnels in a five-dimensional space. Typically wormholes are bracketed by space stations, military or commercial, which provide ports for jump travel. Stations may be owned by planetary governments, or by specific commercial organizations, or they may be completely independent of any planetary organization. Barrayar's original wormhole collapsed, a rare event leading to the Time of Isolation. Barrayar was later re-discovered via a wormhole jump from Komarr. Komarr allows the neighboring Cetagandan empire to use their wormhole to conquer Barrayar, and is later conquered in its turn when Barrayar eventually defeats the Cetagandans.

The stories feature several planetary systems, each with its own political organization, including government by corporate democracy, rule by criminal corporations, monarchies, empires and direct democracies. In most cases, there is a single government which dominates the entire planet (exceptions include Jackson's Whole and Earth). Both Cetaganda and Barrayar have empires, acquired by conquering other planets via neighboring wormholes.

As a tool to simplify the writing process, Bujold devises a standard system of timekeeping universal to all planets regardless of the length of their day and year. Bujold herself has commented that her posited system is neither technologically nor economically feasible, but is rather a convenience for storytelling.

=== Technology ===
Most of the technology in the series is based on 20th-century engineering situations, projected into null-g or alternative solar system situations. Biomedical advances such as cloning, artificial wombs (named "uterine replicators") and cryochambers to preserve and revive recently deceased people are featured heavily in the series.

Bujold presents issues of technological obsolescence and the high rate of failure of R&D projects in personal terms, via bioengineering. Two jump pilots with obsolete navigational brain implants and a number of characters created by genetic manipulation are psychologically stranded by the termination of the programs for which they were designed.

The series features gravity manipulation, both artificially generated in spaceships, and artificially suppressed in ground transport and elevators. Falling Free and Diplomatic Immunity explore the relationship between a culture adapted to an environment without gravity and one which depends on gravity.

=== Computing and communications ===
In most societies featured in the series, paper has been mostly replaced by either plastic sheets or electronic devices, and two-dimensional video is replaced by three-dimensional holograms. Most characters use portable computers called "wristconsoles" and personal computers named "comconsoles".

Interstellar messages, however, have to be recorded on a physical disc which is transported through wormholes at a high cost, and relayed between wormholes by the ships' communication systems, imposing both time and cost constraints on interstellar communications.

=== Military technology ===
As the series features a military background in several novels, special attention is paid to military technology. Ship-to-ship combat includes plasma rays and attacks based on gravity manipulation, and defensive countermeasures. Personal combat includes the use of combat suits, plasma rays, needlers, and nerve disruptors, which emit rays that destroy nerve tissue. Biological weapons are also mentioned in the form of wide-spectrum toxin bombs and genetically modified microbes that target specific races, and in some cases, specific people.

A truth serum, "fast-penta", is a widespread tool used in interrogation. Several defenses are devised, such as induced allergies that kill the subject before they can reveal information, genetic engineering to create immunity, or compartmentalization of information on a need-to-know basis. Miles Vorkosigan has an atypical reaction to the drug, which enables him to thwart his enemies on at least one occasion.

=== Biospheres ===
In the Vorkosigan saga, humans live on planets with diverse degrees of habitability, and have developed diverse adaptation strategies to environments that are only approximately fit for human life. For example, Komarr is a cold planet with high CO_{2} that is going through long-term terraforming to make it habitable, while Beta Colony is a hot, sandy planet where humans must live underground. Barrayar's vegetation is incompatible with Earth's, and often poisonous or allergenic to humans; Barrayarans clear native forest and use compost from Earth-descended plants or horse manure to grow new Earth vegetation. In spaceships and space stations, people live in closed ecologies in which air and waste are continuously reprocessed.

=== Medical technology ===
Medical advances are a fundamental part of the saga's worldbuilding. The most ubiquitous are "uterine replicators", devices that allow complete in vitro reproduction, with gene therapy ("gene cleaning") to correct for congenital defects. In Ethan of Athos, this also makes possible an all-male society in which eggs are produced by ovaries maintained in a lab. The Cetagandan haut go beyond gene cleaning, deliberately engineering the human genome in an attempt to produce a post-human species (Cetaganda, Diplomatic Immunity).

Other advances include genetic manipulation to produce microbes and animals tailored for specific purposes, including decoration, or humans adapted for combat or to live and work in zero gravity. Fertile hermaphrodites have been created in an attempt to surpass gender roles. Medical prolonging of human life has advanced to achieve natural lifespans of 120 years or more, though Barrayar lags galactic civilization on this. Cloning is featured in the series, prominently in the person of Mark, Miles' clone-brother, and in a morally dubious industry on Jackson's Whole that grows clones of wealthy people to transplant their brains from elderly bodies to youthful, healthy ones.

Barrayar is an exception to most of these advances due to its long isolation from the rest of humanity. Women carrying their babies to term without uterine replicators are the rule at the beginning of the series, and there is an ingrained fear of mutation in its society. The social challenges posed by medical technology and Miles Vorkosigan's visible deformities are integral to the plot of several of the stories.

=== Society ===
The time required for wormhole jumps between planetary systems means travel and communication require time and effort which isolate each planet and allow it to develop its own culture, most of them derived to some extent from a culture known historically on Earth.

For example, the planet Athos creates a monosexual culture in which men reproduce in vitro without female intervention, Cetaganda is an empire in which hierarchies are based in genetic fitness, Jackson's Whole is a cutthroat criminal planet in which trade and money are law, and Escobar is a moderate planet focused on scientific advancement.

The novels do not focus much on several sources of social organization and prejudice on Earth, such as language, skin color, and religion. In general, Nexus inhabitants speak a common language, though they may know other languages or have a planetary accent. A good-looking woman, whether a four-armed quaddie, a Cetagandan haut-lady glimpsed in her floating bubble, or a Barrayaran damsel, has skin comparable to ivory or milk. On the other hand, the most prominent genotype on Barrayar is olive skin (and brown eyes and dark hair). The Arqua family are described as dark-skinned, and the Durona group and Ky Tung are Eurasian. Only isolated Athos has a planetary religion, though Cordelia Naismith and Leo Graf (the hero of Falling Free) believe in a God.

The environment and history of the planets dictate their social structures and prejudices. For example, because of the isolation of Barrayar, located with a single wormhole to connect it with the rest of the galaxy, and its people having to defend a broadly habitable planet, Barrayarans both need and can afford a militaristic society. Their genetic isolation has led them to create a patriarchal society to preserve genetic purity. The Betans, on a hostile planet where they must live in domes, rely on industrial export and limit not only childbearing but also every kind of behavior that might be considered "antisocial". From their point of view, Barrayaran society is irrational and backward, while the Barrayarans view the Betans as sexually and politically undisciplined, referring to a "Betan vote" as an obstacle to decision-making. Planets accessible by many wormholes become centers of trade and finance, whether benign (Komarr, Escobar) or malicious (Jackson's Whole). Finally, some dwellers in space habitats look down on those who call one planet home as "dirt suckers".

=== The Vorkosigans and Barrayar ===
In all the books except Ethan of Athos and Falling Free, the protagonists are connected to the planet Barrayar, home of the Vorkosigan clan. For this planet Bujold devised a history which allowed for "swords 'n' spaceships" due to the transition between the Time of Isolation and galactic culture. In the lifetime of Miles Vorkosigan, Barrayar uses spaceships, computers, and other high technology, but its culture remembers dueling, celebrates the Emperor's birthday by handing him bags of gold, and provides liveried life-sworn servants to carry love letters sealed with the writer's blood. In the conservative backwoods, some still practice infanticide if signs of mutation are detected. Stories of the evils of mutation are pervasive within Barrayaran culture.

Barrayar is a planet colonized by humans some four hundred years prior to Shards of Honor, the first Vorkosigan novel. Shortly after colonization, the 50,000 settlers are cut off by a failure of the sole wormhole connecting Barrayar to the rest of humanity. During the following centuries, the "Time of Isolation", the colony regresses socially and technologically, eventually developing a feudal form of government, in which the Emperor of Barrayar is supported by sixty regional counts and other minor aristocrats, identified by the honorific prefix Vor- in their names. The Vor caste is a military one, and Barrayaran culture is highly militaristic and hierarchical. The Counts, however, originate as accountants, with the duty of ensuring that the Emperor's taxes are collected. Because of Barrayar's tradition of direct military action, the Counts also become extremely militaristic.

Barrayar is eventually rediscovered via a different wormhole route controlled by the rich merchant planet Komarr. The Komarrans allow the neighboring expansionist Cetagandan Empire to invade Barrayar in return for commercial rights and concessions. Despite a significant technological advantage, the Cetagandans are finally expelled at great cost after many years of occupation and guerrilla warfare, in large part due to the leadership of General Count Piotr Vorkosigan, Miles' paternal grandfather. The Barrayarans then conquer and annex Komarr under the command of Admiral Aral Vorkosigan, Count Piotr's second son. Due to a massacre initiated by a subordinate, Aral Vorkosigan acquires the sobriquet "Butcher of Komarr."

Aral Vorkosigan later meets Cordelia Naismith, an enemy officer from Beta Colony, at the commencement of another war. Forced to work together to survive on a hostile planet, they fall in love and eventually marry, resulting in the conception of Miles.

An attempt to poison Aral during his regency for the child Emperor, Gregor Vorbarra, leads to the exposure of a pregnant Cordelia to a teratogenic compound, the antidote to the poison. Desperate experimental medical procedures are required to save the unborn baby, and the side effects of the antidote threaten to kill Cordelia. Miles is transferred to a uterine replicator to allow medical procedures that would threaten his mother. Miles' physical development is severely affected; in particular, his long bones are short and fragile. As an adult, he is subtly but noticeably misshapen and no taller than a nine-year-old boy. As a result, he has to deal with the deeply ingrained prejudice against mutants on his native world (though he is not technically a mutant since the damage is teratogenic). With nearly pathological determination and high intelligence, aided by his supportive parents and their high social rank, he fashions an extraordinary military and civilian career for himself in the Barrayaran Empire.

== Reception ==
=== Awards and nominations ===
- Falling Free – won the Nebula Award for Best Novel of 1988; inducted in 2014 into the Prometheus Hall of Fame for Best Classic Fiction; nominated for the Hugo Award for Best Novel in 1989
- The Mountains of Mourning – won the 1990 Hugo and Nebula awards for best novella
- Weatherman – nominated for 1991 Nebula awards for best novella
- The Vor Game – won the Hugo for Best Novel in 1991; nominated for the Locus Award for Best Science Fiction Novel that same year
- Barrayar – won the Hugo and Locus Awards in 1992; nominated for the Nebula Award for Best Novel of 1991
- Mirror Dance – won the Hugo and Locus Awards for Best Novel in 1995
- Cetaganda – nominated for the Locus Award in 1997
- Memory – nominated for the Hugo, Nebula, and Locus Awards in 1997
- A Civil Campaign – nominated for the Hugo, Nebula, and Locus Awards in 2000
- Diplomatic Immunity – nominated for the Nebula Award in 2002
- Winterfair Gifts – nominated for the 2005 Hugo for best novella
- Cryoburn – nominated for the Hugo Award and Locus Award in 2011
- Captain Vorpatril's Alliance – nominated for the Hugo Award in 2013
- The entire series won the Hugo Award for Best Series in 2017.

=== Sales and international popularity ===
Three of the novels made the New York Times Bestseller List when first released in hardback: A Civil Campaign at #26, Diplomatic Immunity at #25, and Cryoburn at #32. The novels have been translated into a number of languages and the covers of various international editions have been archived.

A comic book adaptation of The Warrior's Apprentice was published in France in 2010, which was the first of a projected series called La Saga Vorkosigan.

== Works ==
The Saga's internal chronology does not match the order in which the books were written. Bujold has stated that she is generally in favor of reading the books in internal chronological order, with caveats. A more detailed chronology can be found in The Vorkosigan Companion.

With the publication of Cryoburn, almost all Vorkosigan tales were available as free e-texts on a CD that accompanied the hardcover release. This CD was initially shared online, but has since been withdrawn by request of the author. Earlier works published up to 2004, including novels (except Memory) and the short stories (except "Dreamweaver's Dilemma"), have been repackaged in omnibus editions. The first of these was Vorkosigan's Game (September 1990), an omnibus volume published by a book sales club, collecting The Vor Game and the three-novella Borders of Infinity anthology. While all the books and novellas are currently in print as ebooks, in America they are in print as omnibus editions.

The roots of the Vorkosigan Saga lie in an early collection by Bujold called Dreamweaver's Dilemma. The title story features Beta Colony, and another story contains a character named Cordelia Naismith, perhaps a distant ancestor of the Vorkosigan character. When beginning her first novel, Shards of Honor, Bujold incorporated these elements, but greatly expanded. She followed that up with the second novel with the same setting, The Warrior's Apprentice, then worked on Ethan of Athos. After being rejected by four publishers, The Warrior's Apprentice was accepted by Baen Books, who agreed to a three-book deal to include the two other novels.

Shards of Honor and Barrayar concern Miles' parents, Ethan of Athos involves a few minor characters from other Vorkosigan novels, and Falling Free does not involve Miles or any of his family, though in some later novels Miles encounters the descendants of the characters from Falling Free.

Vorkosigan Saga timeline
| Time / Age (Note: Relative to series protagonist Miles Vorkosigan) | Title | First published | Hugo | Nebula | Locus | Omnibus collection |
|---|---|---|---|---|---|---|
| -500 | "Dreamweaver's Dilemma" (Note: Set in same universe, but no Vorkosigan family appearances) | 1996 | | | | Dreamweaver's Dilemma (Note: Published in Feb 1996 for the Boskone 33 conference; original story was written c. 1982) |
| -200 | Falling Free | 1988 (Note: Originally published serially in Analog between December 1987 and February 1988) | Finalist | Won | | Miles, Mutants & Microbes (Note: Also includes the novella "Labyrinth") |
| -1 | Shards of Honor (Note: Primarily focuses on Cordelia Naismith, Miles' mother) (Note: Novel incorporates the short story "Aftermaths" as an epilogue; "Aftermaths" was originally published in Far Frontiers 5 (Spring 1986)) | 1986 | | | | Cordelia's Honor |
| -0 | Barrayar | 1991 | Won | Finalist | Won | Cordelia's Honor |
| +17 | The Warrior's Apprentice | 1986 | | | | Young Miles |
| +20 | "The Mountains of Mourning" in Borders of Infinity (Note: Borders of Infinity is a three-novella anthology with a framing story set when Miles is 25 years old.) | 1989 (Note: Originally published in Analog magazine, May 1989) | Won | Won | | Young Miles |
| +20 | The Vor Game (Note: Incorporates the short story "Weatherman", which was originally published in Analog, Feb 1990) | 1990 | Won | Finalist (Note: For "Weatherman") | Finalist | Young Miles |
| +22 | Cetaganda | 1995 | | | Finalist | Miles, Mystery & Mayhem |
| +22 | Ethan of Athos | 1986 | | | | Miles, Mystery & Mayhem |
| +23 | "Labyrinth" in Borders of Infinity | 1989 (Note: Originally published in Analog magazine, August 1989) | | | | Miles, Mystery & Mayhem |
| +24 | "The Borders of Infinity" in Borders of Infinity | 1987 (Note: Originally published in the anthology Free Lancers (1987)) | | | | Miles Errant |
| +24 | Brothers in Arms | 1989 | | | | Miles Errant |
| +28 | Mirror Dance | 1994 | Won | | Won | Miles Errant |
| +29 | Memory | 1996 | Finalist | Finalist | Finalist | (none) |
| +30 | Komarr | 1998 | | | | Miles in Love |
| +30 | A Civil Campaign | 1999 | Finalist | Finalist | Finalist | Miles in Love |
| +31 | "Winterfair Gifts" in Irresistible Forces (Note: Irresistible Forces is an anthology edited by Catherine Asaro) | 2004 | Finalist | | | Miles in Love |
| +32 | Diplomatic Immunity | 2002 | | Finalist | | Miles, Mutants & Microbes |
| +35 | Captain Vorpatril's Alliance (Note: Primarily focuses on cousin Ivan Vorpatril; Miles is a minor character) | 2012 | Finalist | | | (none) |
| +35 | "The Flowers of Vashnoi" | 2018 | | | | (none) |
| +39 | Cryoburn | 2010 | Finalist | | Finalist | (none) |
| +42 | Gentleman Jole and the Red Queen | 2016 | | | | (none) |

=== Omnibus editions ===
1. Vorkosigan's Game (September 1990), an omnibus volume published by a book sales club, collecting The Vor Game and the three-novella Borders of Infinity anthology
2. Cordelia's Honor (November 1996), combined edition of Shards of Honor, "Aftermaths", and Barrayar with an afterword by the author ISBN 0-671-87749-6
3. Young Miles (June 1997), omnibus: The Warrior's Apprentice, The Mountains of Mourning, and The Vor Game ISBN 0-671-87787-9
4. Miles, Mystery and Mayhem (December 2001), omnibus: Cetaganda, Ethan of Athos, and Labyrinth ISBN 0-671-31858-6
5. Miles Errant (September 2002), omnibus: The Borders of Infinity, Brothers in Arms, and Mirror Dance ISBN 0-743-43558-3
6. Miles, Mutants and Microbes (August 2007), omnibus: Falling Free, Labyrinth and Diplomatic Immunity ISBN 978-1-4165-2141-9
7. Miles in Love (February 2008), omnibus: Komarr, A Civil Campaign and "Winterfair Gifts" ISBN 978-1-4165-5522-3

=== Original publication information ===
1. "Aftermaths" (Spring 1986, in Far Frontiers, Volume V ISBN 0-671-65572-8)
2. Shards of Honor (June 1986) ISBN 0-671-72087-2
3. The Warrior's Apprentice (August 1986) ISBN 0-671-65587-6
4. Ethan of Athos (December 1986) ISBN 0-671-65604-X
5. "The Borders of Infinity" (September 1987, in Free Lancers ISBN 0-671-65352-0)
6. Falling Free (December 1987 – February 1988, serialized in four issues of Analog Science Fiction and Fact magazine)
7. Brothers in Arms (January 1989) ISBN 0-671-69799-4
8. "The Mountains of Mourning" (May 1989 issue of Analog)
9. "Labyrinth" (August 1989 issue of Analog)
10. Borders of Infinity (October 1989, as an anthology collecting "The Mountains of Mourning", "Labyrinth", and "The Borders of Infinity", tied together with an untitled framing story) ISBN 0-671-69841-9
11. "Weatherman" (February 1990 issue of Analog)
12. The Vor Game (September 1990), incorporating a slightly different version of "Weatherman" ISBN 0-671-72014-7
13. Barrayar (July–September 1991, serialized in three issues of Analog; published as a novel in October 1991 ISBN 0-671-72083-X)
14. Mirror Dance (1994) ISBN 0-671-72210-7
15. Cetaganda (October–December 1995, serialized in three issues of Analog; published as a novel in October 1996 ISBN 0-671-87744-5)
16. Dreamweaver's Dilemma (February 1995, a collection including the novella Dreamweaver's Dilemma) ISBN 978-0-915368-66-2
17. Memory (October 1996) ISBN 0-671-87845-X
18. Komarr (June 1998) ISBN 0-671-87877-8
19. A Civil Campaign (September 1999) ISBN 0-671-57827-8
20. Diplomatic Immunity (May 2002) ISBN 0-743-43533-8
21. Winterfair Gifts (February 2004, in the anthology Irresistible Forces: Catherine Asaro, editor ISBN 0451211111)
22. Cryoburn (October 2010) ISBN 978-1-4391-3394-1
23. Captain Vorpatril's Alliance (November 2012) ISBN 978-1-4516-3845-5
24. Gentleman Jole and the Red Queen (February 2016) ISBN 978-1-4767-8122-8
25. The Flowers of Vashnoi (May 2018)

=== Individual titles ===
==== "Dreamweaver's Dilemma" (short story) ====
"Dreamweaver's Dilemma" is a short story set at the beginning of Earth's age of space colonization and genetic manipulation. It was published in the book of the same name, which is a collection of short stories and essays by Bujold that had been previously unpublished and that she gathered together for publication along with her appearance at Boskone in 1996. "Dreamweaver's Dilemma" contains the first mention of Beta Colony. It is also the only Vorkosigan Saga story not published or republished by Baen Books.

==== Falling Free ====
200 years before the birth of Miles Vorkosigan, engineer Leo Graf encounters the Quaddies, who are genetically engineered to have an extra pair of arms in place of legs in order to work better in the free-falling environment of space. Collected in the omnibus edition Miles, Mutants and Microbes.

==== Shards of Honor ====
Captain Cordelia Naismith of Beta Colony meets and eventually falls in love with Captain Lord Aral Vorkosigan of Barrayar when they are both stranded on an uninhabited planet. After being captured by the Barrayarans and then escaping twice, she returns home a war hero. However, her own people believe she has been brainwashed and try to "cure" her of her love for Aral. She eventually flees to Barrayar to be reunited with him. Collected in the omnibus edition Cordelia's Honor.

==== "Aftermaths" (short story) ====
Two people retrieve bodies in space near Escobar after the failed Barrayaran invasion. The story was originally a postscript to Shards of Honor and later included in the omnibus edition Cordelia's Honor.

==== Barrayar ====
While Cordelia Vorkosigan is pregnant with Miles, an attempted assassination threatens her unborn child's life. Count Vordarian launches a coup. Collected in the omnibus edition Cordelia's Honor.

==== The Warrior's Apprentice ====
Seventeen-year-old Miles breaks both legs running an obstacle course, seemingly ruining his chance of a military career. On a visit to Beta Colony, he obtains a ship, a pilot, and a contract to run guns to a blockaded government. He eventually takes over much of the blockading mercenary fleet through brilliant improvisation, sheer audacity and much luck. The unexpected arrival of his cousin Ivan Vorpatril raises Miles' suspicions. He hastens home to foil a plot against his father. Collected in the omnibus edition Young Miles.

==== The Mountains of Mourning (novella) ====
Miles has just graduated from the Imperial Academy, and is at home at Vorkosigan Surleau with his parents. A woman from an isolated rural village demands justice for the murder of her baby, who was born with a cleft lip and palate, but was otherwise healthy. Miles' father sends him to investigate as his Voice (representative with full powers) to gain experience. Miles solves the mystery and exercises justice and mercy in appropriate measures. Collected in the omnibus editions Vorkosigan's Game; Young Miles; and Borders of Infinity.

==== The Vor Game ====
Miles is shipped off-planet to the Hegen Hub after refusing to obey what he considers to be a criminal order at a training camp and being accused of treason (again). He finds himself having to rescue his friend and emperor, Gregor Vorbarra. Collected in the omnibus editions Vorkosigan's Game and Young Miles.

==== Cetaganda ====
Miles and Ivan are sent to the homeworld of the Cetagandan Empire to represent Barrayar at an Imperial funeral, and quickly become entangled in a murderous Cetagandan plot involving power, poisons, and the peculiar application of eugenics in the Cetagandan haut ruling class. Miles helps defeat the plot, which would have greatly amplified the Cetagandan threat to Barrayar and other systems, and in the process collects a piece of information that causes him to dispatch Elli Quinn on her mission in Ethan of Athos. Collected in the omnibus edition Miles, Mystery, and Mayhem.

==== Ethan of Athos ====
This novel does not feature Miles except indirectly; his eventual girlfriend, Commander Elli Quinn of the Dendarii Free Mercenary Fleet, plays a leading role. Collected in the omnibus edition Miles, Mystery, and Mayhem.

==== Labyrinth (novella) ====
Miles travels to Jackson's Whole, ostensibly to buy weapons, but in reality to help geneticist Dr. Hugh Canaba leave his current employer to go to work for Barrayar. Canaba throws a wrench into the works when he refuses to leave without certain experimental samples which he has injected into one of his earlier projects, a prototype "super-soldier". Even worse, the "super-soldier" has been sold to the paranoid and sadistic Baron Ryoval, whom Miles has recently offended.

Miles breaks into Ryoval's laboratory, but is caught and imprisoned in a utility sublevel where they are also keeping Canaba's dangerous specimen, "Nine". This turns out to be an eight-foot-tall warrior, complete with fangs, claws, superhuman strength and speed, and a ravenous appetite. Miles is shocked to find that the creature is female, and, despite her fearsome appearance, intelligent and emotionally vulnerable. She challenges him to prove that he believes she is human by making love to her. Miles gets to indulge his weakness for tall, strong women.... He offers her a new life with the Dendarii, and a new name: Taura. They escape, committing one supreme act of sabotage and revenge before Dendarii Captain Bel Thorne manages to negotiate a ransom.

Miles finds several aspects of the deal unacceptable and the exchange turns into a minor battle with Ryoval's security. In the course of their hasty departure from the Jackson system, Miles sows confusion by telling different lies (and a couple of vital truths) to Ryoval and his rival half-brother, weapons dealer Baron Fell. Collected in the omnibus editions Vorkosigan's Game; Miles, Mystery, and Mayhem; Miles, Mutants and Microbes; and Borders of Infinity.

==== The Borders of Infinity (novella) ====
Miles goes undercover and allows himself to be captured by the Cetagandans, who have invaded and occupied the planet Marilac, in order to infiltrate a maximum-security POW camp on Dagoola IV. His mission is to get the Marilacan commander out, but he has to improvise when he finds the man catatonic and on the verge of death.

With help from Suegar, an apparent religious fanatic, and Tris, the leader of the female prisoners, he instills order and hope in the apathetic, distrustful inmates and makes them rehearse for quick embarkation (disguised as a food distribution procedure). By quoting Suegar's "scripture" (half a page torn from The Pilgrim's Progress), Miles covertly signals his fleet to attack and rescue them. The Dendarii thereby stage one of the largest mass breakouts in history. As a result, the Cetagandans put a price on Naismith's head. At this point, they (along with nearly everyone else) are unaware that Naismith and Miles Vorkosigan are one and the same. Collected in the omnibus editions Vorkosigan's Game; Miles Errant; and Borders of Infinity.

==== Brothers in Arms ====
On the run from Cetagandans furious about his Dagoola IV escapade, Miles and his fleet reach the relative safety of Earth. When he reports to the Barrayaran Embassy there, he is made the Third Military Attaché. Miles is captured, and his clone, trained as an assassin by Komarrans bent on exacting a measure of revenge for the conquest and annexation of their planet, is successfully substituted for him. Collected in the omnibus edition Miles Errant.

==== Borders of Infinity ====
The novellas "The Mountains of Mourning", "Labyrinth", and "The Borders of Infinity" were reprinted with an untitled framing story in which Miles reports to Simon Illyan, head of Barrayaran Imperial Security ("ImpSec"). The framing story emphasizes an audit—both financial and political—of ImpSec, questioning Miles' activities and expenditures during the previous adventures. This volume is short-novel length; the three-novella anthology with its framing story was reprinted in the book sales club omnibus Vorkosigan's Game (1990). The novellas are currently in print as part of other omnibus volumes but without the tie-together framing story.

==== Mirror Dance ====
Pretending to be Miles, Mark takes part of the Dendarii on a mission to free clones from Jackson's Whole, but is soon surrounded by the enemy. When Miles comes to the rescue, things go very badly wrong. Collected in the omnibus edition Miles Errant.

==== Memory ====
After Miles is forced to resign from ImpSec for covering up his new medical disability, he finds himself temporarily appointed an Imperial Auditor, with sweeping powers and answerable only to the Emperor, to investigate the sudden mental impairment of ImpSec chief Simon Illyan.

==== Komarr ====
Miles Vorkosigan accompanies fellow Imperial Auditor Professor Vorthys to Komarr to investigate a serious accident in space which may have been sabotage. There, he manages to defeat plotters who seek to seal off the only wormhole to Barrayar, and falls in love with his hostess, Ekaterin Vorsoisson, who is trapped in an unhappy marriage.

This novel is notable for the switching of viewpoints between its two protagonists as part of the structure of a given scene. For instance, the scene of Ekaterin's questioning with fast-penta begins from her viewpoint, but as the drug takes hold (and the novel begins a new chapter), it switches to Miles' viewpoint. This technique is expanded in the next novel where multiple viewpoints are used. Collected in the omnibus edition Miles in Love.

==== A Civil Campaign ====
As Barrayar prepares for Emperor Gregor Vorbarra's wedding to a Komarran heiress, Miles attempts to court Ekaterin Vorsoisson without her knowledge. Part of the omnibus edition Miles in Love.

==== Winterfair Gifts (novella) ====
This novella was published in February 2004 as part of the anthology Irresistible Forces (Catherine Asaro, editor). Bujold wrote this after completing Diplomatic Immunity.

The wedding of Miles and Ekaterin is recounted from the viewpoint of Miles' Armsman Roic. Miles introduces Roic to Taura on her first (and due to her short life expectancy, probably her last) visit to Barrayar. The pair get along well, despite her rather unusual appearance. However, their blossoming romantic relationship is shattered when he makes a careless remark about "hideous, bioengineered mutants" —referring to the 'butter bugs' in Mark's latest commercial venture. Taura is hurt and insulted.

When Ekaterin is taken ill, Taura traces the cause to a string of pearls that had apparently been sent by current Dendarii Admiral (and Miles's ex-lover) Elli Quinn, and which do not look right to her augmented vision. With Roic's help, she brings it to the attention of ImpSec. The poisoned pearls are traced to a newly acquired enemy of Miles'. Ekaterin recovers, and the wedding goes smoothly.

That night, Roic is on guard when Taura joins him. She tells him that she probably only has a year or two left to live, and therefore takes everything as it comes. Roic replies, "Can you teach me to do that?" Collected in the omnibus edition Miles in Love.

==== Diplomatic Immunity ====
On the way back from his belated honeymoon, Miles is dispatched to Quaddiespace to untangle a diplomatic incident. Collected in the omnibus edition Miles, Mutants and Microbes.

==== Captain Vorpatril's Alliance ====
On Komarr, Ivan is asked by an ImpSec friend to protect a young woman who has been targeted by a criminal gang. The assignment leads him into a conspiracy involving Jackson's Whole politics, hired assassins, criminal syndicates, and a potentially dangerous secret concerning Barrayar. It also involves his in-laws.

==== The Flowers of Vashnoi (novella) ====
Still new to her duties as Lady Vorkosigan, Ekaterin is working together with an expatriate scientist on a radical scheme to recover the lands of the Vashnoi exclusion zone, the lingering radioactive legacy of the Cetagandan invasion of the planet Barrayar. When the scientist's experimental bioengineered creatures go missing, the pair discover that the zone still contains deadly old secrets.

==== Cryoburn ====
Miles investigates a cryogenic corporation on the planet Kibou-daini, with the assistance of Jin, a local boy.

==== Gentleman Jole and the Red Queen ====
Three years after the death of Aral Vorkosigan, Admiral Jole of the Sergyar Fleet (who once was Aral's subordinate as well as lover) receives a proposal. Aral's widow Cordelia plans to use the genetic material she and Aral had saved and offers him the option of fathering children from his genes and some of Aral's frozen gametes.

== See also ==
- List of military science fiction works and authors
