= The Vor Game =

1990 science fiction novel by Lois McMaster Bujold

- The cover of the first edition
- Author: Lois McMaster Bujold
- Audio read by: Grover Gardner
- Cover artist: Tom Kidd
- Language: English
- Series: Vorkosigan Saga
- Genre: Science fiction
- Publisher: Baen Books
- Publication date: 1990
- Publication place: United States
- Pages: 345
- ISBN: 978-0-671-72014-8
- Preceded by: Brothers in Arms
- Followed by: Barrayar

The Vor Game is a science fiction novel by Lois McMaster Bujold, first published in September 1990. It won the 1991 Hugo Award for Best Novel. The Vor Game is a part of the Vorkosigan Saga, and is the sixth full-length novel in publication order, and is the sixth story, including novellas, in the internal chronology of the series. It was included in the 1997 omnibus Young Miles.

== Plot summary ==
Miles Vorkosigan graduates from the Academy, but is upset to learn he is being sent to replace the weather officer at the Barrayaran Empire's winter infantry training base on remote Kyril Island. He is somewhat mollified by the placement officer's explanation that the posting is to see if he can handle the discipline and military routine. If he can, he will be reassigned to a more desirable posting. However, he cannot help but get into trouble.

Miles refuses to obey what he deems a criminal order by the base commander, who has him arrested for mutiny, and as he is high Vor, technically treason. He is quickly returned to the capital and sequestered in the bowels of Imperial Security (ImpSec) by Simon Illyan, who, along with his father, concludes that Miles had behaved correctly, but has also gained notoriety for his insubordinate action and cannot expect to serve in any branch of the Imperial Service, with one possible exception. Miles' father, Aral Vorkosigan, persuades Illyan to transfer Miles to ImpSec, despite Illyan's and Miles' reluctance.

Miles is sent to help evaluate the Hegen Hub (conveniently out of the way). There, under his cover identity as an arms dealer, he is framed for murder and arrested. While in custody, he is startled to find Emperor Gregor, the Barrayaran ruler, in the same cell. Gregor tells him that he ran away during a visit to Komarr and joined a merchant ship's crew as a navigator, but was then left behind without pay at Consortium Station and jailed for vagrancy. Miles attempts to extricate Gregor, but is soon entangled in a mysterious plot involving an amoral femme fatale, his homicidal former Kyril Island commanding officer, and Hub power politics. Miles encounters his Dendarii mercenary friends and, after once again outmaneuvering their leader, Admiral Oser, resumes command under his Admiral Naismith persona. He is able to rescue Gregor from the femme fatale (an extremely devious, short mercenary leader herself) and get the mutually distrustful Hegen Hub planets to present a united defense to repel a surprise attack by a Cetagandan invasion fleet, with timely help from Barrayaran reinforcements jointly commanded by his father and Gregor.

Afterward, Gregor and ImpSec decide to put the Dendarii on permanent secret retainer for covert missions, with Miles officially installed as liaison.

== "The Weatherman" ==
The first several chapters of The Vor Game (chapter 1 through part of chapter 6) were originally published in a slightly different form as a novella entitled "The Weatherman" in the February 1990 issue of Analog magazine. The story covers Miles's assignment to Kyril Island through his arrest and the beginning of his detention at ImpSec.

== Awards ==
The Vor Game won the Hugo Award for Best Novel in 1991. It also received a nomination for a Locus Award that same year.
