= The Warrior's Apprentice =

1986 novel by Lois McMaster Bujold

- Cover of the first edition (art by Alan Gutierrez)
- Author: Lois McMaster Bujold
- Audio read by: Grover Gardner
- Language: English
- Series: Vorkosigan Saga
- Genre: Science fiction
- Publisher: Baen Books
- Publication date: 1986
- Publication place: United States
- ISBN: 0-671-65587-6
- Preceded by: Shards of Honor
- Followed by: Ethan of Athos

The Warrior's Apprentice is an English language science fiction novel by Lois McMaster Bujold, part of the Vorkosigan Saga. It was the second book published in the series, and is the fifth story, including novellas, in the internal chronology of the series. The Warrior's Apprentice was first published by Baen Books in 1986, and was included in the 1997 omnibus Young Miles.

== Plot summary ==
When Miles Vorkosigan is disqualified from joining the Barrayaran Imperial Service Academy because he breaks both his fragile legs during the physical entrance test, he sets about trying to prove himself worthy by other means, especially since he blames himself for his aged paternal grandfather's death shortly afterward. To lift Miles' spirits, his mother sends him to Beta Colony to visit his maternal grandmother. Miles has to take his lifelong bodyguard, Bothari, so he seizes the opportunity to have his mother invite Bothari's daughter, Elena, along to broaden her horizons.

At Beta Colony, Miles comes across a tense standoff: "jump pilot" Arde Mayhew refuses to let anyone seize his obsolete starship, the only one he can fly, barricading himself inside and threatening to blow it up rather than let it be scrapped. Miles defuses the situation by buying the freighter from the creditor, using ancestral family lands back on Barrayar as collateral (neglecting to inform the seller that the region is radioactive, a result of the former Cetagandan occupation). He also acquires a crewman, Barrayaran deserter Baz Jesek. To cover the credit note he used to buy the freighter, Miles masquerades as a mercenary leader (in transit) and takes a risky, but very well-paying job offered by Major Carle Daum: transporting a cargo into a war on Tau Verde IV to the losing side, Felice. Bothari and Elena go along.

The star system, however, is under a blockade maintained by a mercenary fleet commanded by Admiral Oser. When the freighter is stopped for inspection, the man in charge decides to take Elena, so Miles has no choice but to overpower him and his lax, small crew. Miles maintains the pretence of being an influential member of a shadowy mercenary outfit, which he calls the Dendarii, and convinces his prisoners to become probationary members, seeing as he has too few people to guard them safely. As time goes on, Miles uses his military genius to first capture and recruit more and more of Oser's personnel and ships, then subtly sabotage Oser's relationship with his employers. Outmaneuvered over and over again, Oser finally gives up and offers to join the Dendarii, under the command of "Admiral Miles Naismith".

However, that is not the end of Miles' troubles. First, Elena and Baz fall in love, and Baz asks for his permission, as Baz's liege lord, to marry her. Miles, after a confrontation with Elena, reluctantly gives it. Then Miles' feckless cousin Ivan Vorpatril shows up. From what Ivan can tell him, Miles deduces that his father is or will be charged with treason, arising from Miles' acquisition of a fleet; Counts and counts' heirs are permitted only a small personal guard. Miles speeds back to Barrayar just in time to extricate his father. To save himself from the same charge, Miles suggests to Emperor of Barrayar (and foster brother) Gregor Vorbarra that he secretly accept the Dendarii as his own, to be employed whenever Barrayaran forces cannot be openly utilized.

== Reception ==
Jo Walton, writing for Tor.com, described The Warrior's Apprentice as having "about ninety percent more depth than you’d expect it to have", but also notes that "the series does get a lot deeper and more complex as it goes on from here."

== Cover art ==
Bujold reports that the novel's cover art had originally been intended for a Keith Laumer novel, "but not used for reasons no one said. The couple were dressed exactly as one sees them; the command chair was empty. So the only addition was Miles, in clothes. (Perhaps sadly.) We got to referring to the skimpy magenta dress as 'Elena’s combat nightie.'"
