= Diplomatic Immunity (novel) =

2002 science fiction novel by Lois McMaster Bujold

- Cover of first edition
- Author: Lois McMaster Bujold
- Audio read by: Grover Gardner
- Cover artist: Stephen Hickman
- Language: English
- Series: Vorkosigan Saga Universe
- Genre: Science fiction
- Publisher: Baen Books
- Publication date: 2002
- Publication place: United States
- Media type: Print (hardback & paperback)
- Pages: 320
- ISBN: 0-7434-3533-8
- OCLC: 48662396
- Dewey Decimal: 813/.54 21
- LC Class: PS3552.U397 D57 2002
- Preceded by: A Civil Campaign
- Followed by: Cryoburn

Diplomatic Immunity is a 2002 science fiction novel by American writer Lois McMaster Bujold, part of the Vorkosigan Saga. It was nominated for the Nebula Award for Best Novel in 2003.

== Plot summary ==
Miles and Ekaterin Vorkosigan are enjoying a delayed honeymoon off-world while their first two children are approaching birth in their uterine replicators back on Barrayar. On their way home, Miles receives Emperor Gregor Vorbarra's command to go to Graf Station in Quaddiespace to untangle a diplomatic incident in his capacity as the nearest Imperial Auditor. There, he is unexpectedly reunited with the Betan hermaphrodite Bel Thorne, a trusted former Dendarii Mercenaries subordinate and his good friend, now working for the Quaddies (as well as Barrayaran Imperial Security as a secret observer).

Quaddies are the result of genetic manipulation centuries before (as described in Bujold's novel Falling Free). Intended to be used as laborers in zero-G, they have extra arms instead of legs. However, the invention of artificial gravity suddenly made them unprofitable to the corporation that created them. They stole a spaceship to avoid being confined to a barracks on a planet for the rest of their lives and colonized a remote star system. At Graf Station, the Quaddies occupy a zero-G section, while visitors use a section with artificial gravity. Quaddies tend to be suspicious of other humans based on their history of callous exploitation.

A convoy of Komarran merchant ships is being prevented from leaving the station due to trouble caused by Barrayaran personnel from their military escort. Furthermore, a Barrayaran security officer is missing, possibly murdered or deserted.

While investigating, Miles uncovers a plot by a high-ranking, renegade, sexless Cetagandan, who has stolen a cargo of extreme importance to the Cetagandans and attempts to hide its tracks by framing Barrayar (and killing the missing Barrayaran officer). By the time Miles figures out what is going on, he and Bel have become infected by a highly lethal bioweapon. Miles nearly dies, but he reaches the nearest Cetagandan world and averts an interstellar war between Cetaganda and Barrayar with his discoveries. He and Bel are cured by the Cetagandans, though they are both, to differing degrees, permanently debilitated.

== Reception ==
Jeff Zaleski, in his Publishers Weekly review, praised Bujold's worldbuilding and "witty, character-centered plot"." Booklist was mixed in their review saying "though Miles remains clever and debonair throughout, too many early series references needlessly obfuscate a breezy, conventional, albeit deep-space, whodunit." Paul Brink, in his review for School Library Journal called it a "quick read (with) an abundance of plot twists", noting that Bujold "gets the technical details right, but keeps explanations to a minimum".
