= Barrayar =

1991 novel by Lois McMaster Bujold

- Author: Lois McMaster Bujold
- Audio read by: Grover Gardner
- Cover artist: Stephen Hickman
- Language: English
- Series: Vorkosigan Saga
- Genre: Science fiction
- Publisher: Baen Books
- Publication date: 1991
- Publication place: United States
- Pages: 386
- Awards: Locus Award for Best Science Fiction Novel (1992)
- ISBN: 978-0-671-72083-4
- Preceded by: The Vor Game
- Followed by: Mirror Dance

Barrayar is a science fiction novel by American writer Lois McMaster Bujold. It was first published as four installments in Analog in July–October 1991, and then published in book form by Baen Books in October 1991. Barrayar won both the Hugo Award for Best Novel and the Locus Award for Best Science Fiction Novel in 1992. It is a part of the Vorkosigan Saga, and is the seventh full-length novel of the series, in publication order. Barrayar is a direct sequel to Bujold's first novel, Shards of Honor (1986), and the two are paired in the 1996 omnibus Cordelia's Honor.

== Plot summary ==
Cordelia, a woman from a very civilized world, has married Aral Vorkosigan, a warrior aristocrat from Barrayar. She is trying to adjust to life on his world, with less advanced technology and much more violent politics than her previous home. Cordelia and Aral are expecting their first child.

Before crafty old Emperor Ezar Vorbarra dies, he maneuvers a very reluctant Aral into agreeing to serve as regent for Ezar's young grandson Gregor. A plot to assassinate the Vorkosigans with poison gas fails, but the antidote, while effective, is also a powerful teratogen that poses a grave threat to the bone development of their unborn son. In a desperate attempt to save the fetus, Cordelia has it transferred to a uterine replicator—an artificial womb—to undergo experimental treatment that may partially combat the otherwise-fatal bone damage. Barrayar, due to its harsh environment, has fostered a deep loathing for mutations, and babies with even minor birth defects are routinely euthanized. Aral's father, Count Piotr Vorkosigan, seeks to abort the fetus rather than have the Vorkosigan name and title passed on to a "deformed mutant," but a furious Cordelia keeps him at bay.

When Count Vidal Vordarian attempts a coup, five-year-old Gregor is rescued by his loyal security chief, Captain Negri, and reunited with the Vorkosigans. Cordelia, Gregor and bodyguard Konstantin Bothari hide from Vordarian's men in the hills, while Aral and his father organize the resistance.

After Cordelia rejoins Aral, they learn that the replicator containing their child, whom they have named Miles, needs periodic maintenance. Without it, the fetus will succumb within six days, but Aral refuses to attempt a rescue when there are far greater concerns. However, Cordelia's personal bodyguard, Ludmilla Droushnakovi, was previously stationed at the palace and knows several top-secret ways to slip inside undetected. Cordelia, Droushnakovi and Bothari set out to rescue Miles and hopefully Gregor's mother, Princess Kareen. When Clement Koudelka, one of Aral's officers, finds out, they kidnap him and persuade him to help out.

In the city, they witness the capture of Lady Alys Vorpatril. They rescue Alys, who is pregnant with Ivan Vorpatril, but her husband Padma is killed. While in hiding, she delivers her son with Bothari's help. Cordelia dispatches Koudelka to get her to safety and sets out with Bothari and Droushnakovi to get Miles.

Once in the palace, Cordelia and her party are caught in a trap. They manage to overpower their captors, but Princess Kareen is fatally shot by one of Vordarian's men. Bothari sets fire to part of the Imperial Palace to cover their retreat as they take Vordarian hostage. When Vordarian defies Cordelia, she orders Bothari to behead him. They escape with the replicator—and Vordarian's head. Cordelia returns to Aral's base and deposits the head on a table in front of some of Vordarian's wavering allies. Without its leader, the coup falls apart.

Miles is born, fragile and deformed. Five years later, he has very brittle bones, but is very active, rambunctious and intelligent, capturing even Piotr's affection.

In a side plot, Koudelka and Droushnakovi fall in love before the coup and indulge in sex at Vorkosigan House. Cordelia, being a liberal-minded Betan, sees no harm in this, but they are ashamed, and a misunderstanding arises. While they are in hiding during the coup, Cordelia acts as a traditional "go-between" to patch up their relationship. After the coup, they marry, and in novels set later, are the parents of four young women who combine brains, beauty and, thanks to their mother's training, unarmed combat skills.

== Reception ==
Barrayar won both the Hugo Award for Best Novel and the Locus Award for Best Science Fiction Novel in 1992. It was nominated for the Nebula Award for Best Novel in 1991.

The New York Review of Science Fiction (October 1998, number 122) summarizes Barrayar as:

open(ing) the later stage of Bujold's oeuvre, most obviously because of its quantum jump in power, complexity and originality, such as the handling of Bothari, and its excursions into women's territory previously untravelled in SF, but also because it initiates a kind of second, deeper pass over the landscape of the earlier books.
