= Lois McMaster Bujold =

American speculative fiction author (born 1949)

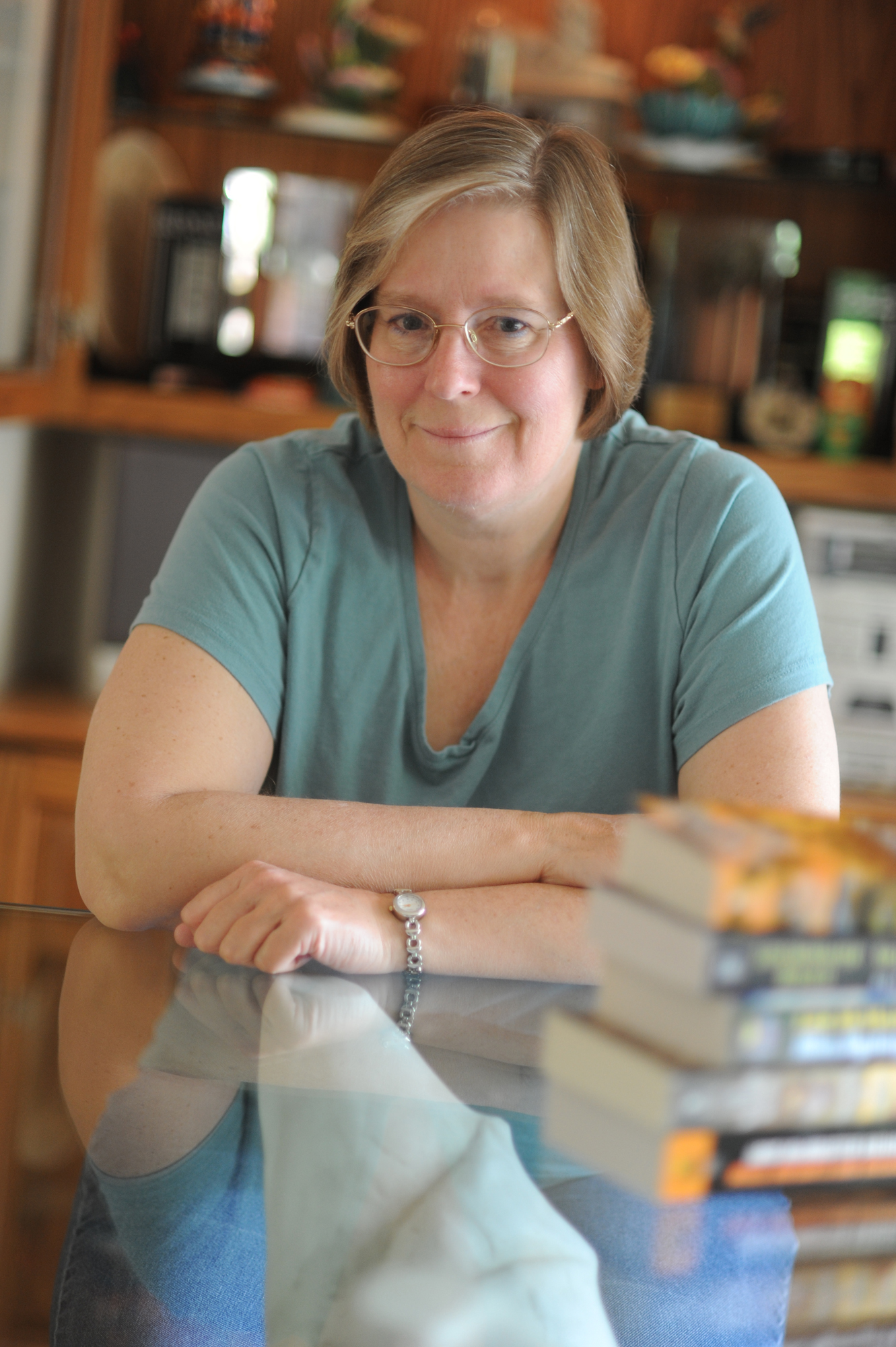
- Bujold at home in 2009
- Born: Lois Joy McMaster; November 2, 1949 (age 76); Columbus, Ohio, U.S.
- Education: Ohio State University
- Occupation: Novelist
- Children: 2
- Writing career
- Period: 1985–present
- Genres: Science fiction, fantasy
- Website: dendarii.com

Lois McMaster Bujold (/buːˈʒoʊld/ boo-ZHOHLD; born November 2, 1949) is an American speculative fiction writer. She has won the Hugo Award for best novel four times, matching Robert A. Heinlein's record (not counting his Retro Hugos). Bujold is best known for her Vorkosigan Saga, a series of science fiction novels featuring Miles Vorkosigan, a physically impaired interstellar spy and mercenary admiral from the planet Barrayar, set approximately 1000 years in the future. The Science Fiction and Fantasy Writers Association named her its 36th SFWA Grand Master in 2019.

The bulk of Bujold's works comprises three series: the Vorkosigan Saga and two fantasy series, the World of the Five Gods and the Sharing Knife. Her Vorkosigan novella "The Mountains of Mourning" won both the Hugo Award and Nebula Award. In the fantasy genre, The Curse of Chalion won the Mythopoeic Award for Adult Literature and was nominated for the 2002 World Fantasy Award for best novel, and her fourth Hugo and second Nebula were for Paladin of Souls. In 2011 she was awarded the Skylark Award. She has won two Hugo Awards for Best Series, in 2017 for the Vorkosigan Saga and in 2018 for the World of the Five Gods.

== Biography ==
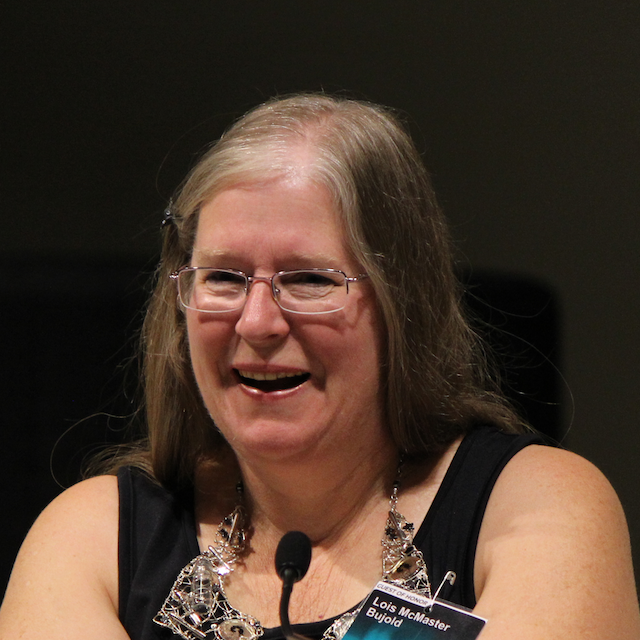
Bujold at Finncon 2012 in Tampere

Bujold is the daughter of Robert Charles McMaster and attributes her early interest in science fiction, as well as certain aspects of the Vorkosigan Saga, to his influence. He was editor of the Nondestructive Testing Handbook.

Bujold writes that her experience growing up with a famous father is reflected in the same experience that her characters (Miles, Fiametta) have of growing up in the shadow of a "Great Man". Having observed this tendency in both genders, she wonders why it is always called "great man's son syndrome", and never "great man's daughter's syndrome." Her brother, an engineer like their father, helped provide technical details to support her writing of Falling Free.

She has stated that she was always a "voracious reader". She started reading adult science fiction at the age of nine, picking up the habit from her father. She became a member of science fiction fandom, joined the Central Ohio Science Fiction Society, and co-published StarDate, a science fiction fanzine in which a story of hers appeared under the byline Lois McMaster. Her reading tastes later expanded and she stated she now reads "history, mysteries, romance, travel, war, poetry, etc".

She attended Ohio State University from 1968 to 1972. While she was interested in writing, she didn't pursue an English major, feeling it was too concerned with literary criticism instead of literary creation.

She married John Fredric Bujold in 1971, but they divorced in the early 1990s. The marriage produced two children, a daughter named Anne (born 1979) and a son named Paul (born 1981). Anne Bujold is a sculptor and metal artist who is an Assistant Professor of Sculpture at the University of Louisiana at Lafayette. Formerly she was a metal artist and welder in Portland, Oregon and vice president of the Northwest Blacksmith Association. Bujold currently lives in Minneapolis, Minnesota.

== Inspiration ==
Bujold had been friends with Lillian Stewart Carl since high school, where they "collaborated on extended story lines [but where] only a fragment of the total was written out.". At one point, she even co-produced a Star Trek zine called StarDate which she wrote for. In college, she wrote a Sherlock Holmes mystery as well. However, she stopped writing after that, being busy with marriage, family, and a career in hospital patient care.

It wasn't until her thirties that she returned to writing. Bujold has credited her friend Lillian Stewart Carl's first book sales with inspiring her to return to the field: "it occurred to me that if she could do it, I could do it too." She originally planned to write as a hobby again, but discovered the amount of work required was too much for anything other than a profession, so she decided to turn professional. With support from Carl and Patricia Wrede, she was able to complete her first novel.

== Science fiction ==
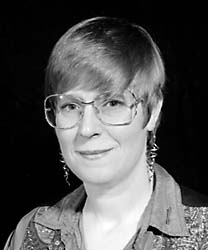
Lois McMaster Bujold in 1996. Photo by David Dyer-Bennet

Lois Bujold wrote three books (Shards of Honor, The Warrior's Apprentice and Ethan of Athos) before The Warrior's Apprentice was finally accepted, after four rejections. The Warrior's Apprentice was the first book purchased, though not the first Vorkosigan book written, nor would it be the first one to be published. On the strength of The Warrior's Apprentice, Baen Books agreed to a three-book deal to include the two bracketing novels. By 2010, Baen Books claimed to have sold two million copies of Bujold's books.

Bujold is best known for her Vorkosigan Saga, a series of novels featuring Miles Vorkosigan, a physically impaired interstellar spy and mercenary admiral from the planet Barrayar, set approximately 1000 years in the future. The series also includes prequels starring Miles' parents, along with companion novels centered on secondary characters. Earlier titles are generally firmly in the space opera tradition with no shortage of battles, conspiracies, and wild twists, while in more recent volumes, Miles becomes more of a detective. In A Civil Campaign, Bujold explores yet another genre: a high-society romance with a plot that pays tribute to Regency romance novelist Georgette Heyer (as acknowledged in the dedication). It centers on a catastrophic dinner party, with misunderstandings and dialogue justifying the subtitle "A Comedy of Biology and Manners".

The author has stated that the series structure is modeled after the Horatio Hornblower books, documenting the life of a single person. In themes and echoes, they also reflect Dorothy L. Sayers' mystery character Lord Peter Wimsey. Bujold has also said that part of the challenge of writing a series is that many readers will encounter the stories in "utterly random order", so she must provide sufficient background in each of them without being excessively repetitious. Most recent printings of her Vorkosigan tales do include an appendix at the end of each book, summarizing the internal chronology of the series.

Bujold has discussed her own views on the optimum reading order for the Vorkosigan series in her blog.

== Fantasy ==
Bujold also wanted to break into the fantasy genre, but met with early setbacks. Her first foray into fantasy was The Spirit Ring. She wrote the book "on spec", shopped it around, and found low offers, sending her back to Baen Books, where Jim Baen bought it for a fair price in exchange for the promise of more Vorkosigan books. Bujold called this experience very educational; the book received little critical acclaim, and had only mediocre sales.

She did not attempt to break into the fantasy market again for almost another decade, with The Curse of Chalion. This book was also written on spec and offered to a book auction. This time she met with considerable critical and commercial success by tapping into a crossover market of fantasy and romance genre fans. The fantasy world of Chalion was conceived partly due to a University of Minnesota course she took about medieval Spain in the mid-'90s. She would eventually expand the setting into the World of the Five Gods series, including Paladin of Souls, The Hallowed Hunt, and the fifteen novels, novellas, and short stories of the Penric and Desdemona series.

The next fantasy world she created was the tetralogy set in the universe of The Sharing Knife, borrowing inspiration for its landscapes and for the dialect of the "farmers" from ones she grew up with in central Ohio. She writes that her first readers who helped proofread it said she got it exactly right and they could recognize Ohio features in the descriptions and dialects.

== Relationship with fan fiction ==
Bujold has generally been supportive of fan fiction written about her characters and universe. Amy H. Sturgis, in her essay "From Both Sides Now: Bujold and the Fan Fiction Phenomenon", notes that this is unusual for writers of Bujold's generation, most of whom are opposed to fan fiction. Sturgis relates this to Bujold's own production of Star Trek and Sherlock Holmes fan fiction early in her life, which Sturgis saw as an apprenticeship for her professional writing career.

Bujold herself ties her appreciation of fan fiction to her appreciation of "active" readers. To her, good readers are the "unsung collaborators" who make the story work, by actually constructing the world and characters in their heads. Books, to her, don't actually exist until they enter the reader's head and grow there. And sometimes, the characters and stories in a book grow so much that they escape the writer's original confines and become fan fiction. To Bujold, great literature is never "sterile", stopping with only what the original author wrote. She further believes that fan fiction gives authors a unique chance to see into the minds of those "invisible collaborators", the readers.

Despite this, she no longer reads fan fiction about her own characters due to legal and financial concerns, "fascinating as [she] finds it".

== Awards and nominations ==
| W | Won | N | Nominated |

| Series | Book | Award | | |
| Series | Book | Hugo | Locus | Nebula |
|---|---|---|---|---|
| Vorkosigan Saga | Falling Free (1988) | N | – | W |
| Vorkosigan Saga | The Vor Game (1990) | W | N | – |
| Vorkosigan Saga | Barrayar (1991) | W | W | N |
| Vorkosigan Saga | Mirror Dance (1994) | W | W | – |
| Vorkosigan Saga | Memory (1996) | N | N | N |
| Vorkosigan Saga | A Civil Campaign (1999) | N | N | N |
| Vorkosigan Saga | Diplomatic Immunity (2002) | – | – | N |
| Vorkosigan Saga | Cryoburn (2010) | N | N | – |
| Vorkosigan Saga | Captain Vorpatril's Alliance (2012) | N | N | – |
| Vorkosigan Saga | Overall (for Best Series) | W | – | – |
| World of the Five Gods | The Curse of Chalion (2001) | N | N | – |
| World of the Five Gods | Paladin of Souls (2003) | W | W | W |
| World of the Five Gods | The Hallowed Hunt (2005) | – | N | – |
| World of the Five Gods | Overall (for Best Series) | W | – | – |

Bujold has also received the following accolades:

- John W. Campbell Award for Best New Writer: Nominated (1987)
- "The Mountains of Mourning" (1990) won the Hugo and Nebula Awards for Best Novella.
- Komarr (1999) won the Minnesota Book Award.
- A Civil Campaign (2000) and Paladin of Souls (2004) were nominated for the Minnesota Book Award.
- "Winterfair Gifts" (2005), Penric's Demon (2016) and Penric and the Shaman (2017) were nominated for Hugo Award for Best Novella.
- Forry Award for Lifetime Achievement in the field of Science Fiction: Won (2013)
- Prometheus Hall of Fame award for Best Classic Fiction (2014) for Falling Free
- SFWA Damon Knight Memorial Grand Master Award (2020)
