= Kaya Press =

Independent non-profit publisher

Kaya Press is an independent non-profit publisher of writers of the Asian and Pacific Islander diaspora. Founded in 1994 by the postmodern Korean writer Soo Kyung Kim, Kaya Press is housed in the Department of American Studies and Ethnicity at the University of Southern California.

The current editors of Kaya Press are Sunyoung Lee and Neelanjana Banerjee. The board of directors includes Jean Ho, Huy Hong, Adria Imada, Juliana S. Koo, Sunyoung Lee, Viet Thanh Nguyen, Chez Bryan Ong, and Patricia Wakida, and the editorial committee consists of Lisa Chen, Neelanjana Banerjee, Sunyoung Lee, Warren Liu, Gerald Maa, and Sesshu Foster.

Kaya Press publishes fiction, experimental poetry, critical essays, noir fiction, film memoir, avant-garde art, performance pieces, and the recovery of important and overlooked work (e.g. "lost novels") from the Pacific Rim and the API diaspora. Kaya identifies as "a group of dedicated writers, artists, readers, and lovers of books working together to publish the most challenging, thoughtful, and provocative literature being produced throughout the Asian and Pacific Island diasporas." Kaya Press participated in a selection of literary events, such as the Smithsonian Asian Pacific American Literature Festival and the LA Times Festival of Books.

== Branding ==
"Kaya" refers to the tribal confederation of six Korean city-states that existed from the middle of the first until the sixth century CE that is remembered as a utopia of learning, music, and the arts due to its trade and communication with China, Japan, and India. This word has multiple meanings across different languages: in Sanskrit, "kaya" means "body"; in Japanese, "kaya" often refers to a type of yew tree that withstands harsh conditions; in Tagalog, it means "to be able"; and in Turkish it means "rock"; in Zulu, "kaya" means "home". Like its name, Kaya Press's publishing vision is to explore the multiple connections, chance or otherwise, between cultures.

Kaya's logo evokes the smoking tiger featured in many Korean folk paintings. Kaya's tiger smokes a cigar in lieu of the traditional Asian pipe to connect the historical with the contemporary.

== Awards ==
Kaya press and authors' awards include Gregory Kolovakas Prize for Outstanding New Literary Press, the American Book Award, the Association for Asian American Studies Book Award, the PEN Beyond Margins Open Book Prize, the Asian American Writers’ Workshop Award, the PEN Oakland Josephine Miles Prize, and the PEN/Robert W. Bingham Award

== Authors and books ==
Kaya Press writers include:

- Casio Abe – Born in 1958, Casio Abe is a critic, poet, professor and author of several books on Japanese film and popular culture. From 2007 to March 2012, he was appointed as the professor for the Faculty of Arts, Course of Philosophy and Creative Writing at Rikkyo University. Since April 2012, he is an associate professor at Hokkaido University Graduate School of Letters, Filmology and Cultural Studies of Representation. His most recent books include “Nihon Eiga no 21 Seiki ga Hajimaru” (2005 Kinema Junposha), “Mikio Naruse” (2005 Kawade Shobo Shinsha), “Boku ha Konna Nichijo ya Kanjo de dekiteimasu” (2007 Shobunsha) and “Manga ha Ugoku” (2008 Izumi Shobo). He published his first poetry book in 2008. He reviews films, subculture and literature from perspectives using various techniques with the ability to reconstruct in great detail. He is one of the few with monographs in both areas of film and subculture. His book, Beat Takeshi vs Takeshi Kitano was published through Kaya Press in 2004.
- Genpei Akasegawa – He emerged on the Japanese art scene around 1960, starting in the radical “Anti-Art” movement and becoming a member of the seminal artist collectives Neo Dada and Hi Red Center. The epic piece Model 1,000-Yen Note Incident (1963–1974), which involved a real-life police investigation and trial, cemented his place as an inspired conceptualist. His irreverent humor and cunning observation of everyday life made him popular as a writer, peaking with his 1998 book Rõjinryoku, in which he put forth a hilariously positive take on the declining capabilities of the elderly. Hyperart: Thomasson (Kaya Press 2010), marks a crucial turning point in his metamorphosis from a subversive culture to a popular culturatus.
- Hari Alluri – At the age of twelve, Hari Alluri immigrated to Vancouver, Coast Salish territories. He is the author of Carving Ashes (CiCAC, 2013) and The Promise of Rust (Mouthfeel, 2016). A poet, educator, and teaching artist, his work appears widely in anthologies, journals and online venues, including Chautauqua, Poemeleon and Split This Rock. He is a founding editor at Locked Horn Press, where he has co-edited two anthologies, Gendered & Written: Forums on Poetics and Read America(s): An Anthology. He holds an MFA in creative writing from San Diego State University and, along with the Federico Moramarco Poetry International Teaching Prize, he has received VONA/Voices and Las Dos Brujas fellowships and a National Film Board of Canada grant. Hari currently serves as editor of pacific Review in San Diego, Kumeyaay land. His book, The Flayed City was published through Kaya Press on March 8, 2017.
- Nobuo Ayukawa – Nobuo Ayukawa was born in Tokyo in 1920 and is considered the “pilot” of modern Japanese poetry. He was one of the founding poets of the Arechi (Wasteland) group, and translated the work of T.S. Eliot and William Burroughs into Japanese. Ayukawa rejected traditional Japanese poetic concerns, mining his past experiences as a soldier in World War II and paying homage to his literary influences in abstract, lyrical modernist works that collaged remembered conversations among friends with literary quotations taken (and in some cases, reworked) from Mann, Eliot, Kafka, Pound and others. In addition to being a much-admired poet and translator, Ayukawa was a well-respected literary and social critic. He published over a dozen books of poetry, essays and literary criticism. He died in Tokyo in 1986. His book, America and Other Poems was published through Kaya Press in 2007.
- Roddy Bogawa – Born and raised in Los Angeles, California, Japanese American filmmaker Roddy Bogawa is known for his film and video works which investigates history and culture via lyrical and innovative narrative structures. First gaining attention as one of the “Asian American Bad Boys” along with Gregg Araki and Jon Moritsugu, his work along with theirs and several other film school educated directors signaled a shift in practice from the social activist and documentary films which had marked the first wave of Asian American cinema to a more expansive exploration of identity and culture. He studied art and played in punk bands before turning to filmmaking receiving his MFA degree from the University of California at San Diego studying with director Jean-Pierre Gorin, cinematographer Babette Mangolte, and critic Manny Farber. His awards and grants include Creative Capital Foundation, the American Center Foundation, the Jerome Foundation Independent Filmmaker grant, a NYFA fellowship, and New York State Council on the Arts. He currently lives in New York City and works as a professor at New Jersey City University. In 2013, he was the subject of a mid-career retrospective at the Museum of Modern Art in New York that screened fourteen of his films and videos over a week titled If Films Could Smell. His book, If Films Could Smell, the assemblage of interviews and writings by Bogawa from his nearly thirty years as a filmmaker and artist, was published through Kaya Press on April 25, 2017.
- Luis Cabalquinto – Born in the Magarao, Philippines, Luis Cabalquinto first came to the United States in 1968. He is a veteran Filipino American poet. He studied writing at Cornell University, the New School, and New York University. Cabalquinto writes in English, Pilipino, and Bikol. He is the recipient of many honors and awards, including a Balagtas Award from the Writers’ Union of the Philippines, a Dylan Thomas Poetry Award from the New School, an Academy of American Poets Poetry Award, and a Writing Fellowship Award from the New York Foundation for the Arts. He lives in New York and the Philippines. His book, Bridgeable Shores: Selected Poems (1969-2001) was published through Kaya Press in 2001.
- Brian Castro – Brian Castro is a novelist and essayist. As of 2023 he is adjunct professor at the University of Adelaide and was inaugural director of the J.M. Coetzee Centre for Creative Practice. Shanghai Dancing was published through Kaya Press in 2009.
- Sam Chanse – Sam Chanse is a writer and theater artist based in New York and California. A 2015 Sundance Ucross Playwright Fellow and member of the Ma-Yi Writers Lab, her work has also been supported by the Lark Play Development Center, Labyrinth Theater, Leviathan Lab, the Actors Studio Playwrights/Directors Unit, Second Generation, Ars Nova, Bindlestiff Studio, Asian American Theater Company, Tofte Lake Center, and the San Francisco Arts Commission. She received her MFA in playwriting from Columbia University, and in musical theater writing from NYU's Tisch School of the Arts. She served as the artistic director of San Francisco-based arts nonprofit Kearny Street Workshop, and as co-director of Locus Arts. Her book, Lydia's Funeral Video was published through Kaya Press in 2015.
- Anelise Chen – Anelise Chen is the author of So Many Olympic Exertions (Kaya Press 2017), an experimental novel that blends elements of sportswriting, memoir, and self help. She hails from Temple City, California, and received a BA in English from UC Berkeley and an MFA in Fiction from NYU. Her essays and reviews have appeared in the New York Times, NPR, BOMB Magazine, The New Republic, VICE, Village Voice and many other publications. She has received fellowships from the Asian American Writers’ Workshop, the Wurlitzer Foundation, and she will be a 2019 Literature Fellow at the Akademie Schloss Solitude in Stuttgart, Germany. She currently teaches writing at Columbia University and writes a column on mollusks for The Paris Review.
- Lisa Chen – She was born in Taipei, Taiwan. She studied at the University of California, Berkeley and the University of Iowa. She lives in Brooklyn and works as a freelance writer and editor. Mouth (Kaya Press 2007), Chen's debut collection of poetry, travels from parachute girls in Millbrae to Ezequiel the murderer at a border town, creating a cartography of geographic and bodily landscapes whose distances are measured by languages.
- Floyd Cheung – Born in Hong Kong, Cheung grew up in Las Vegas. He is a professor and teaches in the Department of English Language and Literature as well as the American Studies Program at Smith College. He teaches courses in American literature, American studies and Asian American literature and culture. In each of these fields, Cheung has published articles in academic journals. He is particularly interested in the interpretation and recovery of early Asian American texts, and he has published several articles about and edited multiple volumes by forgotten or lesser-known authors. Cheung is also a member of the Five College Asian/Pacific/American Studies Certificate Program, for which he served as the founding chair. In 2012, he was awarded Smith's Sherrerd Prize for Distinguished Teaching. From 2014 to the present, Cheung has been serving as the director of the Sherrerd Center for Teaching and Learning. Cheung also writes poetry. Edited by Cheung, The Hanging on Union Square (Kaya Press 2013) is H.T. Tsiang's satiric, quasi-experimental novel which explores leftist politics in Depression-era New York – an era of union busting and food lines – in an ambitious style that combines humor-laced allegory with snatches of poetry, newspaper quotations, non sequiturs, and slogans.
- Choi In-Hun – Born in 1936 in Hoeryong, North Korea, Choi is one of Korea's most renowned writers and dramatists. His masterpiece The Square has been translated into eight languages, including English, French, Spanish, and German. He attended the University of Iowa's International Writing Program in 1973, and the play he wrote during this time, Once upon a Long Time Ago, became the first Korean play to be staged at the Playhouse Theatre in New York City. He has received the Dongin Literary Award, Baeksang Arts Award, Chungang Culture Grand Prize, and Lee San Literature Prize. English editions of his works include A Grey Man, Reflections on a Mask, The Daily Life of Ku-Poh the Novelist, and House of Idols. He taught literary creation at Seoul Institute of the Arts from 1977 to May 2001. He died of cancer in 2018 at the age of 82. His book, Typhoon is forthcoming in 2020 through Kaya Press.
- Sia Figiel – Born in 1967, Figiel is a Samoan poet and novelist. Author of novels, plays, and poetry, she has traveled extensively in Europe and the Pacific Islands, and has had residencies at the University of Technology in Sydney, the East-West Center in Hawaii, the Pacific Writing Forum at the University of the South Pacific in Fiji, and Logoipulotu College in Savaii. She is known as a performance poet and has appeared at several international literary festivals. She lives in Samoa. Her debut novel, where we once belonged (Kaya Press 1999), won the Commonwealth Writer's Prize Best First Book for the Southeast Asia/South Pacific region. Her book also marked the first time a novel by a Samoan woman was published in the United States. Her sequel to her first novel, They Who Do Not Grieve (Kaya Press 2003) poetically weaves together the voices of three generations of women from two families in Samoa and New Zealand.
- Josephine (Josey) Foo – Foo is a native of Malaysia, Peranakan on her father's side and Chinese on her mother's, who immigrated to the United States in the mid-1980s. Her first collection of writings and art, including a fully realized children's picture story about an intrepid traveling three-legged beagle, Endou, was published by Lost Roads in 1995; portions were included in The Best American Essays 1995. Tomie’s Chair, a second mixed genre book of poetry, prose and art written in response to an art installation on immigration on the Lower East Side, was published by Kaya in 2002. Foo graduated from Vassar College, and has an MFA in creative writing from Brown University and a J.D. from the University of Pennsylvania. Since 2006, she has worked in the Office of the Chief Justice of the Navajo Nation. Foo has received fellowships from the National Endowment for the Arts and the Mid-Atlantic Council on the Arts, and was the recipient of an Eve of St. Agnes Poetry Award from Negative Capability journal in 1993. A two-time Yale Series of Younger Poets finalist, Foo and her husband Richard Ferguson live in a 1911 apple orchard farm house in northwestern New Mexico.
- Sesshu Foster – Poet, teacher, and community activist Sesshu Foster grew up in East Los Angeles. He earned his MFA from the Iowa Writers’ Workshop. He is the author of the poetry collections City Terrace Field Manual (Kaya Press 1996), American Loneliness: Selected Poems (2006), World Ball Notebook (2009), which won an American Book Award and an Asian American Literary Award for Poetry, and City of the Future (Kaya Press 2018). Foster is the author of the novel of speculative fiction Atomik Aztex (2005), which won the Believer Book Award and imagines an America free of European colonizers. Foster's work has been published in The Oxford Anthology of Modern American Poetry (2000), Language for a New Century: Poetry from the Middle East, Asia and Beyond (2008), and State of the Union: 50 Political Poems (2008). He co-edited the anthology Invocation L.A.: Urban Multicultural Poetry (1989). Foster has taught in East LA for 25 years as well as at the University of Iowa, the California Institute for the Arts, Naropa University's Jack Kerouac School of Disembodied Poetics, Pomona College, and the University of California, Santa Cruz. He lives in Los Angeles.
- Luis H. Francia – He is a poet, journalist, and nonfiction writer. Francia's nonfiction works include the memoir Eye of the Fish: A Personal Archipelago (Kaya Press 2001), winner of both the 2002 Open Book Award and the 2002 Asian American Writers award, and Memories of Overdevelopment: Reviews and Essays of Two Decades. He is in the Library of America's Becoming Americans: Four Centuries of Immigrant Writing. He is the editor of Brown River, White Ocean: A Twentieth Century Anthology of Philippine Literature in English, and co-editor of Vestiges of War: The Philippine-American War and the Aftermath of an Imperial Dream, 1899-1999, as well as the literary anthology, Flippin’: Filipinos on America. His latest collection of nonfiction, RE: Reflections, Reviews, and Recollections, was published by the University of Santo Thomas in 2014. Among his poetry collections are The Arctic Archipelago and Other Poems, Museum of Absences, The Beauty of Ghosts and Tattered Boat which have been included in numerous journals and anthologies, the latter including Returning a Borrowed Tongue, Language for a New Century, Field of Mirrors, and Love Rise Up! He has been a regular contributor to The Village Voice and The Nation, and was the New York correspondent for Asiaweek and The Far Eastern Economic Review. He teaches at New York University and Hunter College's Asian American Studies Department, as well as teaching creative writing at the City University of Hong Kong and writes an online column, “The Artist Abroad,” for Manila's Philippine Daily Inquirer. He lives in Queens, New York, with his wife, Midori Yamamura.
- Kimiko Hahn – Kimiko Hahn was born in Mount Kisco, New York, and grew up in Pleasantville, New York, and Tokyo, Japan. She earned a BA from the University of Iowa and earned an MA in Japanese literature from Columbia University. Hahn is the author of nine books of poetry, including The Artist's Daughter (2002), The Narrow Road to the Interior (2006), Toxic Flora (2010), and Brain Fever (2014). She is the winner of the PEN/Voelcker Award for Poetry, the American Book Award, and the Shelley Memorial Award from the Poetry Society of America. She has also been award fellowships from the New York Foundation for the Arts and the Guggenheim Foundation and received numerous grants including the National Endowment for the Arts Fellowship and a Lila Wallace-Reader's Digest Award. Hahn teaches in the MFA program at Queens College. In 2016, she was elected president of the Poetry Society of America. The Unbearable Heart (Kaya Press 1996) won the Before Columbus Foundation's American Book Award.
- Younghill Kang – Born in 1903 in what is now known as North Korea, Younghill Kang was educated in Korea, and Japan. He emigrated to the U.S. in 1921, finishing his education in Boston and Cambridge. Kang published articles in The New York Times, The Nation, The Saturday Review of Literature, and the Encyclopædia Britannica, among others. While teaching English at New York University, he became friends with fellow professor Thomas Wolfe, who introduced him to Scribner's editor Maxwell Perkins. Kang's first book, The Grass Roof, was published by Scribner's in 1931. A children's book based on Kang's early life entitled The Happy Grove was published in 1933, and East Goes West was released in 1937 and through Kaya Press in 1997. Throughout his life, Kang was the recipient of numerous awards and honors, including two Guggenheim fellowships, the New School's Louis S. Memorial Prize, and an honorary doctorate in literature from Koryo University. Au Matin du Pays Calme, the French translation of The Grass Roof, won Le Prix Halperine Kaminsky, France's annual award for best book in translation. Kang died in 1972 at his home in Satellite Beach, Florida.
- Kazuo Hara – Born in 1945, Hara Kazuo was influenced as a young man by the protest movements that took place throughout Japan and the world in the late 1960s and 70s. He founded Shisso Productions in 1971 with his wife, producer, and primary collaborator Sachiko Kobayashi. He has published five documentary films thus far, including The Emperor's Naked Army Marches On widely recognized as most important and influential documentary ever made in Japan, Goodbye CP, Extreme Private Eros: Love Song 1974, and A Dedicated Life. His book, Camera Obtrusa (Kaya Press 2009) is the first full-length translation of Hara's writings on his life and method; Hara tells his own story of growing up an outsider, detailing the fascinating processes that led to each of his groundbreaking documentaries.
- Takeshi Kitano – Takeshi Kitano was born in Tokyo in 1947. He entered show business as a stand-up comic in 1972, and has become Japan's foremost media personality. Kitano turned director in 1989 to make Violent Cop. Fireworks (Hana-bi) won the Golden Lion Prize at the 1997 Venice Film Festival. He also became a leader in what came to be called the Japanese New Wave of the 1990s — a movement of younger Japanese directors who rejected or subverted the conventions of their studio-trained forebears. Beat Takeshi vs Takeshi Kitano (Kaya Press 2004) is the first book on Kitano's work to be published in English.
- Andrew Leong – He is a comparativist who works primarily in Japanese and English with additional interests in Spanish and Portuguese. Leong is the translator of Lament in the Night (Kaya Press 2012), a collection of two novels by Shōson Nagahara, an author who wrote for a Japanese reading public in Los Angeles during the 1920s. He is also completing a manuscript entitled In the Time of Utopia: Queer and Mixed Origins of Japanese/American Literature. This book examines Japanese and English language texts written by Sadakichi Hartmann, Yoné Noguchi, Arishima Takeo, and Nagahara Shōson—authors who resided in the United States between the opening of mass Japanese emigration in 1885 and the ban on Japanese immigration imposed by the Immigration Act of 1924. Prior to joining the faculty of UC Berkeley in 2018, Leong was an assistant professor of English and Asian Languages and Cultures at Northwestern University (2012–2018). He received his Ph.D. in Comparative Literature (English, Japanese, Spanish) from UC Berkeley in 2012, and completed his B.A. in Comparative Literature (English, Spanish, Mathematics) at Dartmouth College in 2003.
- Ed Lin – Ed Lin, a native New Yorker of Taiwanese and Chinese descent, is the first author to win three Asian American Literary Awards and is an all-around standup kinda guy. His books include Waylaid (Kaya Press 2002), his literary debut and a trilogy set in New York's Chinatown in the 70s: This Is a Bust (Kaya Press 2007), Snakes Can’t Run and One Red Bastard. Ghost Month, published by Soho Crime in July 2014, is a Taipei-based mystery, and Incensed, published October 2016, continues that series. Lin lives in Brooklyn with his wife, actress Cindy Cheung, and son.
- R. Zamora Linmark – Poet, novelist, and playwright R. Zamora Linmark was born in Manila, Philippines in 1968 and has lived in Honolulu, Madrid, and Tokyo. He earned a BA from the University of Hawai‘i at Mānoa. His books include the poetry collections Prime-Time Apparitions (2005), The Evolution of a Sigh (2008), and Drive-By Vigils (2011) and the novels Private: Rolling the R’s (Kaya Press 1997), which Linmark adapted for the stage in 2008, and Leche (2011). His writing often deals with Filipino/a American stereotypes. Linmark was awarded a fellowship from the Japan-United States Friendship Commission and fellowships from the National Endowment for the Arts and the Fulbright Foundation. He has taught at the University of Hawai‘i and the University of Miami.
- Catherine Liu – Catherine Liu is professor in the Department of Film and Media Studies/Visual Studies, Comparative Literature and English at the University of California, Irvine. In addition to directing the UCI Humanities Center, she is completing a book manuscript which addresses the abuse of populist mistrust of elites and its relationship to anti-intellectualism in American cultural politics. Her research and teaching focus on the intellectual history and formation of cultural criticism, psychoanalytic theory, political economy of cultural revolutions and the work of the Frankfurt School and Walter Benjamin. She has published art criticism, museum history, cultural policies and neoliberalism. She published The American Idyll: Academic Anti-Elitism as Cultural Critique with the University of Iowa Press in 2011 and Oriental Girls Desire Romance with Kaya Press in 2012.
- Mimi Lok – Mimi Lok is the author of the story collection Last of Her Name, winner of the PEN/Robert W. Bingham Prize for debut short story collection. The title story was a finalist for the 2018 Katherine Anne Porter Fiction Prize. She is the recipient of a Smithsonian Ingenuity Award and an Ylvisaker Award for Fiction, and was a finalist for the Susan Atefat Arts and Letters Prize for nonfiction. Her work has been published or is forthcoming in McSweeney’s, Electric Literature, Nimrod, Lucky Peach, Hyphen, the South China Morning Post, and elsewhere. Mimi is also the executive director and editor of Voice of Witness, a human rights/oral history nonprofit she cofounded that amplifies marginalized voices through a book series and a national education program.
- Rajiv Mohabir – Rajiv Mohabir is the author of the poetry collections The Taxidermist’s Cut (Four Way Books, 2016) and The Cowherd’s Son (Tupelo Press, 2017). His poetry collection, I Even Regret Night: Holi Songs of Demerara was published with Kaya Press in March 2019. His awards include the Kundiman Poetry Prize, the 2015 AWP Intro Journal award, and a PEN/Heim Translation Fund Grant. His poetry and translations appear internationally in Best American Poetry 2015, Quarterly West, Guernica, Prairie Schooner, Crab Orchard Review, Drunken Boat, Poetry Magazine and many other places. He received his MFA in Poetry and Translation from Queens College, CUNY, a PhD in English from the University of Hawai`i, and works as an assistant professor at Auburn University in Alabama.
- Shoson Nagahara – Nagahara Shōson is the pen name of Nagahara Hideaki. We know very little about the life of Nagahara. Besides the information that we can glean from his writings, we can trace a few scattered immigration and census records. According to these records, he was born in 1900 in Yama-no-uchi-nishi-mura, a small village in northeastern Hiroshima Prefecture. Prior to coming to the United States, he lived with his paternal grandfather in Ushita-mura, which was then a northern suburb of the city of Hiroshima. He arrived in the United States at the age of seventeen in August 1918, landing in Seattle, Washington with plans to meet his father, who was a laborer for the Utah Copper Mining Company in Magna, Utah. Sometime in the early 1920s, Nagahara moved to Los Angeles. He may have returned to Japan some time around 1927, but after 1928, the documentary trail of Nagahara goes cold. He does not appear in the 1930 census, nor does his name appear in War Relocation Authority records. His final resting place is unknown. Lament in the Night (Kaya Press 2012) collects two remarkable novellas by the author Shōson Nagahara, translated from the Japanese for the first time.
- Gene Oishi - Gene Oishi, former Washington and foreign correspondent for the Baltimore Sun, has written articles on the Japanese American experience for The New York Times Magazine, The Washington Post, Newsweek, and West Magazine, in addition to the Baltimore Sun. His memoir, In Search of Hiroshi, was published in 1988. His book, Fox Drum Bebop was published with Kaya Press in 2014. Now retired, he lives in Baltimore, Maryland with his wife Sabine.
- Ishle Yi Park – Poet and singer Ishle Yi Park's first book of poetry, The Temperature of This Water (2004), won three literary awards, including the PEN America Open Book Award for Outstanding Writers of Color. Her work has been published in Ploughshares, Manoa, The Beacon Best, Best American Poetry, and Century of the Tiger: 100 Years of Korean Culture in America, and New American Writing. Her debut collection of poetry, The Temperature of This Water was published with Kaya Press in 2004. Park has performed her poetry & songs at over 300 venues in the United States, Cuba, Aotearoa, Singapore, Korea, Jamaica, and South Africa. She was a touring cast member of Def Poetry Jam & regular on the HBO series, and has opened for artists such as KRS-One, Ben Harper, De La Soul, and Saul Williams. She has two CDs: Work is Love & Luminous, and Homegrown, with Ammon Tainui Watene (in a collaboration called Ohana Nui). Park served as the Poet Laureate of Queens, New York from 2004 to 2007. She lives in Hawaii.
- Shailja Patel – An internationally acclaimed Kenyan poet, playwright, activist, and public intellectual, her performances have received standing ovations on four continents. Trained as a political economist, accountant and yoga teacher, she uses text, voice, body, and critical thinking to delve for truth and dissect power. Patel has been African Guest Writer at Sweden's Nordic Africa Institute and poet-in-residence at the Tallberg Forum, Sweden's alternative to Davos. She has appeared on the BBC World Service, NPR and Al-Jazeera, and her political essays appear in Le Monde diplomatique and The New Inquiry, among others. Her work has been translated into 16 languages, and appears in No Serenity Here, the groundbreaking multilingual Chinese–African poetry anthology. Honors include a Sundance Theatre Fellowship, a Creation Fund Award from the National Performance Network, the Fanny-Ann Eddy Poetry Award from IRN-Africa, the Voices of Our Nations Poetry Award, a Lambda Slam Championship, and the Outwrite Poetry Prize. Patel is a founding member of Kenyans For Peace, Truth and Justice, a civil society coalition which works for an equitable democracy in Kenya. In 2012, she was Kenya's poet for Poetry Parnassus, in the London Cultural Olympiad. Migritude (Kaya Press 2010) has been published in Italy and Sweden, and was shortlisted for the prestigious Camaiore Poetry Prize in Italy.
- Amarnath Ravva – California-based writer Amarnath Ravva has performed at LACMA, Machine Project, the MAK Center at the Schindler House, New Langton Arts, the Hammer Museum, USC, Pomona, CalArts, and the Sorbonne. In addition to his writing practice, he is a member of the site specific ambient music supergroup Ambient Force 3000 and for the past eight years he has helped run and curate events at Betalevel, a venue for social experimentation and hands-on culture located in Los Angeles’ Chinatown. He holds a B.A. from U.C. Berkeley and an M.F.A. from CalArts, where he was awarded an interdisciplinary grant to help support his documentary work in South India. His book, American Canyon was published with Kaya Press in October 2014.
- Thaddeus Rutkowski – Thaddeus Rutkowski is the author of the novels Haywire, Tetched and Roughhouse (Kaya Press 1999). Haywire reached No. 1 on Small Press Distribution's fiction best-seller list. All three books were finalists for an Asian American Literary Award. He teaches at Medgar Evers College and at the Writer's Voice of the West Side YMCA in New York. His writing has appeared in The Outlaw Bible of American Poetry, The New York Times, The International Herald Tribune, Fiction and Fiction International. He received a 2012 fiction writing fellowship from the New York Foundation for the Arts.
- Nicky Sa-Eun Schildkraut – Nicky Sa-eun Schildkraut is a poet, scholar and teacher who teaches creative writing and college composition in Los Angeles. As a Korean adoptee, her creative and scholarly work reflects an ongoing interest to explore the emotional and historical aspects of the Korean diaspora as well as transnational adoption. Previously, she has collaborated on avant garde music and art projects with composers and visual artists. She earned an MFA in poetry (2002) and a PhD in literature and creative writing (2012) from the University of Southern California. Her first book of poetry, Magnetic Refrain, was published in February 2013 by Kaya Press. She is currently completing a second book titled Until Qualified For Pearl, containing lyrical and narrative poems, and a non-fiction critical book about adoption narratives in literature and film.
- Lalbihari Sharma – Lalbihari Sharma was born in Chapra village in the United Provinces of India (now Bihar, India). Sharma was indentured by the British East India Company to work the sugarcane fields and published his chautal folksongs in 1916. A musician and singer, he is the first Indo-Caribbean writer to write and publish one of the only books written in the dialect of his village. Not much is known about his life other than the autobiographical information included in his work. A major historical and literary discovery, Sharma's I Even Regret Night: Holi Songs of Demerara (Kaya Press 2019) gives us first-hand insight into the emotional lives of the indentured servants that the British brought from India to the Caribbean/Latin America in the late 1800s.
- Kaneto Shindo – Japanese film director, screenwriter, and film producer, and author Shindo was born in Hiroshima Prefecture in 1912 and continued to make films throughout his life, until his death at the age of 100. Over his lifetime, he directed close to 50 films and wrote the scripts for 200 films. His best known films as a director include Children of Hiroshima, The Naked Island, Onibaba, Kuroneko and A Last Note. He also wrote scripts for some of Japan's most well-known auteurs including Kon Ichikawa, Keisuke Kinoshita, Fumio Kamei, and Tadashi Imai. Shindo narrates his career, from his beginnings as an art director and fledgling screenwriter in the 1930s and 1940s, to his collaborations with Kenji Mizoguchi, Kon Ichikawa and Kinji Fukasaku, to his breakout into independent filmmaking in the 1950s and beyond in Life is Work (Kaya Press 2014).
- H.T. Tsiang – Poet, playwright, and novelist. Hsi Tseng Tsiang (H. T. Tsiang) was born in China in 1899 and came to America as a young man. He was involved with the Greenwich Village literary scene in the 1920s and 1930s, and self-published a number of books which he would hawk at downtown political meetings. Tsiang also appeared as an actor in Hollywood, most notably in the film Tokyo Rose. He died in 1971 in Los Angeles, CA. Tsiang's satiric, quasi-experimental novel The Hanging on Union Square (Kaya Press 2013) explores leftist politics in Depression-era New York – an era of union busting and food lines – in an ambitious style that combines humor-laced allegory with snatches of poetry, newspaper quotations, non sequiturs, and slogans. Originally published in 1937, And China Has Hands (Kaya Press 2016) takes place in a 1930s New York defined as much by chance encounters as by economic inequalities and corruption.
- Denise Uyehara – Uyehara is a performance artist, writer and playwright whose work has been presented in U.S., London, Tokyo, Helsinki and Vancouver. A pioneering artist whose work the Los Angeles Times hails as “mastery [that] amounts to a coup de theater,” Uyehara explores gender, queer subjectivity, body and memory through interdisciplinary performance. His book, Maps of City and Body: Shedding Light on the Performances of Denise Uyehara (Kaya Press 2004), presents the complete texts of “Big Head” and “Maps of City and Body,” two of Uyehara's most acclaimed shows. In both works, Uyehara remains unflinchingly attentive to the transformative details that give our lives shape.
- José García Villa – Jose Garcia Villa was born in Manila, Philippines, in 1908, and emigrated to the United States in 1929. He received a bachelor's degree from the University of New Mexico in 1932, then moved to New York for graduate study at Columbia University. In 1933, Villa dedicated himself exclusively to poetry and the experimental opportunities poetry promised. His first collection, Have Come, Am Here, was published in 1942 by Viking, and won the American Academy of Arts and Letters Award. His next book, Volume Two, was published in 1949 by New Directions, where he served as associate editor from 1949 to 1951. His book, The Anchored Angel: Selected Writings, was published with Kaya Press in 1999. His awards and honors include a Guggenheim Fellowship, Bollingen Foundation Fellowship, Shelley Memorial Award, Philippines Pro Patria Award, Philippines Cultural Heritage Award, and Rockefeller Foundation Fellowship. He was appointed Presidential Adviser on Cultural Affairs by the Philippine government in 1968 and elected Philippines National Artist in 1973. He taught poetry at City College and the New School, and held private poetry workshops in his Greenwich Village apartment. Villa died on February 7, 1997, in New York City.
- Duncan Ryūken Williams – Williams is an associate professor of religion and East Asian languages and cultures and director of the USC Shinso Ito Center for Japanese Religions and Culture at the University of Southern California. He previously served as the executive vice president of Japan House, Los Angeles, held the Shinjo Ito Distinguished Chair of Japanese Buddhism at UC Berkeley, and served as the director of Berkeley's Center for Japanese Studies. He is the author of The Other Side of Zen: A Social History of Soto Zen Buddhism in Tokugawa Japan (Princeton, 2005) and the forthcoming book, Camp Dharma: Buddhism and the Japanese American Incarceration During World War II. He has edited or co-edited five books including Issei Buddhism in the Americas, American Buddhism, and Buddhism and Ecology. He is also the founder of the Hapa Japan Database Project. Hapa Japan: History (Volume 1) and Hapa Japan: Identities & Representation (Volume 2), edited by Williams and published with Kaya Press, are the first substantial collections of essays to survey the history of global mixed-race identities of persons of Japanese descent. This groundbreaking works unsettle binary and simplistic notions of race by making visible the complex lives of individuals often written out of history.
- Nicholas Wong – Born and educated in Hong Kong, Nicholas Wong received his MFA from City University of Hong Kong and has been a finalist for the New Letters Poetry Award and the Wabash Prize for Poetry. Described as a “firestarter” by Time Out: Hong Kong, he is on the teaching faculty of the Hong Kong Institute of Education. Crevasse (Kaya Press 2015), Wong's newest collection of poetry, starts with an epigraph from Maurice Merleau-Ponty that notes the impossibility of observing one's own physical body and, therefore, the necessity of a “second,” “unobservable” body from which to view one's own. Crevasse collects poems that seek to uncover the seam connecting these mutually observed and observing bodies.
- Koon Woon - Koon Woon was born in a small village near Canton in 1949, immigrated to the United States in 1960, and presently resides in Seattle's International District. He earned a BA from Antioch University Seattle and studied at Fort Hays State University. His poetry has appeared in numerous literary journals and anthologies, including The Poem and the World: An International Anthology and Premonitions: The Kaya Anthology of New Asian North American Poetry. As the publisher of the literary zine, Chrysanthemum, and Goldfish Press, Woon is a vocal advocate for Seattle literature. He is the author of The Truth in Rented Rooms (Kaya, 1998), winner of a Josephine Miles Award from PEN Oakland, and Water Chasing Water (Kaya, 2013), winner of the 2014 American Book Award from the Before Columbus Foundation. His poetry appears in Premonitions: The Kaya Anthology of New Asian North American Poetry (1995), among others. Woon is the publisher of Goldfish Press and the literary magazine Chrysanthemum. He lives in Seattle.
- Max Yeh – Max Yeh, described as “a writer on the rampage” by E.L. Doctorow, is the author of The Beginning of the East (FC2, 1992). He was born in China, educated in the United States and has lived in Europe and Mexico. He has taught at the University of California, Irvine, Hobart and William Smith Colleges, and New Mexico State University. He lives in the New Mexico mountains with his wife and daughter, where he works on a wide range of subjects including literary theory, linguistics, art history and science. His book, Stolen Oranges, was published with Kaya Press in 2017.
- Q. M. Zhang – Q.M. Zhang (Kimberly Chang) grew up in upstate New York, lived in China and Hong Kong, and currently makes her home in Western Massachusetts. She is a writer and teacher of creative non/fiction stories and forms, with a focus on Chinese American border crossings. Trained in the disciplines of anthropology and psychology, she has published ethnographic studies of Asian diasporic communities on both sides of the Pacific. Faced with the limitations of her social science tools, she has worked over the last decade to develop herself at the craft of creative non/fiction as the quintessential hybrid literary form for writing about migration and diaspora. She is an alumna of the Juniper Summer Writing Institute and was a resident writer at the Vermont Studio Center. Her book, Accomplice to Memory (Kaya Press 2017), combines memoir, fiction, and documentary photographs to explore the limits and possibilities of truth telling across generations and geographies. An excerpt from the book was published in The Massachusetts Review. She currently teaches at Hampshire College in Amherst, Massachusetts.
