= Believer Book Award =

American literary award

Believer Book Award was an American literary award presented yearly by The Believer magazine between 2005 and 2021. The award was given to those novels and story collections, nonfiction books or essay collections, poetry collections, and, beginning in 2021 (awarded to books published in 2020), works of graphic narrative that the magazine's editors thought were the "strongest and most under-appreciated" of the year. A shortlist and longlist were announced for each genre, along with readers' favorites, then a final winner was selected by the magazine's editors.

The inaugural award was in 2005 for books published in 2004. The last award was given in 2021, when the magazine ceased production. The magazine was bought by McSweeney's in 2022 and resumed publication. It is not known whether the book award will also resume.

== Winners and shortlist ==
=== 2004–2018 ===
The year below denotes when the books were published; the award is announced the following year. Thus below, the inaugural 2004 books were announced in early to mid-2005. From 2004 to 2018, a single award was presented. Beginning in 2019, awards were presented in categories.

Award winners and shortlists, 2004-2018
Year	Author	Title	Result	Ref.
2004	Sam Lipsyte	Home Land	Winner	
2004	Lucy Ellmann	Dot in the Universe	Shortlist	
2004	Francisco Goldman	The Divine Husband	Shortlist	
2004	Michelle de Kretser	The Hamilton Case	Shortlist	
2004	Selah Saterstrom	The Pink Institution	Shortlist	
2005	Sesshu Foster	Atomik Aztex	Winner	
2005	John Wray	Canaan's Tongue	Shortlist	
2005	Tom Bissell	God Lives in St. Petersburg	Shortlist	
2005	Trinie Dalton	Wide Eyed	Shortlist	
2005	Aimee Bender	Willful Creatures	Shortlist	
2006	Cormac McCarthy	The Road	Winner	
2007	Tom McCarthy	Remainder	Winner	
2007	Alain Mabanckou	African Psycho	Shortlist	
2007	Joe Weisberg	An Ordinary Spy	Shortlist	
2007	Elizabeth Hand	Generation Loss	Shortlist	
2007	Jesse Ball	Samedi the Deafness	Shortlist	
2007	Gerard Donovan	Sunless	Shortlist	
2007	Selah Saterstrom	The Meat and Spirit Plan	Shortlist	
2007	Lydie Salvayre	The Power of Flies	Shortlist	
2007	Miranda Mellis	The Revisionist	Shortlist	
2007	Steve Erickson	Zeroville	Shortlist	
2008	Emily Perkins	Novel About My Wife	Winner	
2008	Tod Wodicka	All Shall Be Well; And All Shall Be Well; and All Manner of Things Shall Be Well	Shortlist	
2008	Shannon Burke	Black Flies	Shortlist	
2008	Jim Krusoe	Girl Factory	Shortlist	
2008	John Olson	Souls of Wind	Shortlist	
2008	Toby Olson	Tampico	Shortlist	
2008	Samantha Hunt	The Invention of Everything Else	Shortlist	
2008	Mary Ruefle	The Most of It	Shortlist	
2009	Percival Everett	I Am Not Sidney Poitier	Winner	
2009	Mary Robison	One D.O.A., One on the Way	Shortlist	
2009	Blake Butler	Scorch Atlas	Shortlist	
2009	Christopher Miller	The Cardboard Universe: A Guide to the World of Phoebus K. Dank	Shortlist	
2009	Padgett Powell	The Interrogative Mood	Shortlist	
2010	James Hynes	Next	Winner	
2010	Kira Henehan	Orion You Came and You Took All My Marbles	Shortlist	
2010	Paul Murray	Skippy Dies	Shortlist	
2010	Danielle Dutton	Sprawl	Shortlist	
2010	Grace Krilanovich	The Orange Eats Creeps	Shortlist	
2011	Ben Lerner	Leaving the Atocha Station	Winner	
2011	Helen DeWitt	Lightning Rods	Shortlist	
2011	Lars Iyer	Spurious	Shortlist	
2011	Jesse Ball	The Curfew	Shortlist	
2011	Michelle Latiolais	Widow	Shortlist	
2012	Tamara Faith Berger	Maidenhead	Winner	
2012	Sergio De La Pava	A Naked Singularity	Shortlist	
2012	Barbara Browning	I'm Trying to Reach You	Shortlist	
2012	Karl Ove Knausgård	My Struggle	Shortlist	
2012	Jim Krusoe	Parsifal	Shortlist	
2013	Rebecca Lee	Bobcat and Other Stories	Winner	
2013	Bennett Sims	A Questionable Shape	Shortlist	
2013	Keith Ridgway	Hawthorn and Child	Shortlist	
2013	Kiese Laymon	Long Division	Shortlist	
2013	Fiona Maazel	Woke Up Lonely	Shortlist	
2014	Ottessa Moshfegh	McGlue	Winner	
2014	Valeria Luiselli	Faces in the Crowd	Shortlist	
2014	Diane Cook	Man V. Nature	Shortlist	
2014	Elizabeth McCracken	Thunderstruck and Other Stories	Shortlist	
2014	Antoine Volodine	Writers	Shortlist	
2017	Matthew Rohrer	The Others	Winner	
2017	Leyna Krow	I’m Fine, But You Appear to Be Sinking	Shortlist	
2017	Andrew Durbin	MacArthur Park	Shortlist	
2017	Jenny Zhang	Sour Heart	Shortlist	
2017	Deepak Unnikrishnan	Temporary People	Shortlist	
2018	Rita Bullwinkel	Belly Up	Winner	
2018	Shelley Jackson	Riddance; Or: The Sybil Joines Vocational School for Ghost Speakers & Hearing-Mouth Children	Shortlist	
2018	Hideo Yokoyama, trans. by Louise Heal Kawai	Seventeen	Shortlist	
2018	Mathias Énard	Tell Them of Battles, Kings,	Shortlist	
2018	Ben Passmore	Your Black Friend and Other Strangers	Shortlist	

=== 2019–present ===
The year below denotes when the books were published; the award is announced the following year. Thus below, the inaugural 2004 books were announced in early to mid-2005. From 2004 to 2018, a single award was presented. Beginning in 2019, awards were presented in categories.

Award winners and shortlists, 2019–present
Year	Category	Author	Title	Result	Ref.
2019	Fiction	Ebony Flowers	Hot Comb	Winner	
2019	Fiction	Donatella Di Pietrantonio trans. by Ann Goldstein	A Girl Returned	Shortlist	
2019	Fiction	Sarah Rose Etter	The Book of X	Shortlist	
2019	Fiction	Adam Ehrlich Sachs	The Organs of Sense	Shortlist	
2019	Fiction	Hebe Uhart, trans. by Maureen Shaughnessy	The Scent of Buenos Aires	Shortlist	
2019	Nonfiction	Trisha Low	Socialist Realism	Winner	
2019	Nonfiction	Emmanuel Carrère, trans. by John Lambert	97,196 Words	Shortlist	
2019	Nonfiction	Andrea Long Chu	Females	Shortlist	
2019	Nonfiction	Keum Suk Gendry-Kim, trans. by Janet Hong	Grass	Shortlist	
2019	Nonfiction	Heather Christle	The Crying Book	Shortlist	
2019	Poetry	Deborah Landau	Soft Targets	Winner	
2019	Poetry	Cameron Awkward-Rich	Dispatch	Shortlist	
2019	Poetry	Steve Healey	Safe Houses I Have Known	Shortlist	
2019	Poetry	Franny Choi	Soft Science	Shortlist	
2019	Poetry	Christopher Kondrich	Valuing	Shortlist	
2020	Fiction	Vigdis Hjorth, trans. by Charlotte Barslund	Long Live the Post Horn!	Winner	
2020	Fiction	Souvankham Thammavongsa	How to Pronounce Knife	Shortlist	
2020	Fiction	Lisa Robertson	The Baudelaire Fractal	Shortlist	
2020	Fiction	Nathalie Léger	The White Dress	Shortlist	
2020	Fiction	Peter Cameron	What Happens at Night	Shortlist	
2020	Graphic Narrative	Jonathan Hill	Odessa	Winner	
2020	Graphic Narrative	Vivian Chong and Georgia Webber	Dancing after TEN	Shortlist	
2020	Graphic Narrative	Lawrence Lindell	From Truth with Truth	Shortlist	
2020	Graphic Narrative	Gipi, trans. by Jaime Richards	One Story	Shortlist	
2020	Graphic Narrative	Danny Noble	Shame Pudding: A Graphic Memoir	Shortlist	
2020	Nonfiction	Ashon T. Crawley	The Lonely Letters	Winner	
2020	Nonfiction	Alysia Li Ying Sawchyn	A Fish Growing Lungs	Shortlist	
2020	Nonfiction	Emerson Whitney	Heaven	Shortlist	
2020	Nonfiction	Namwali Serpell	Stranger Faces	Shortlist	
2020	Nonfiction	Emily J. Lordi	The Meaning of Soul: Black Music and Resilience Since the 1960s	Shortlist	
2020	Poetry	Yona Harvey	You Don’t Have to Go to Mars For Love	Winner	
2020	Poetry	Candice Wuehle	Death Industrial Complex	Shortlist	
2020	Poetry	Noah Falck	Exclusions	Shortlist	
2020	Poetry	John Murillo	Kontemporary Amerikan Poetry	Shortlist	
2020	Poetry	Tess Taylor	Rift Zone	Shortlist	

== See also ==
- Believer Poetry Award
