= Harpe brothers =

American criminal duo

Micajah "Big" Harpe
- No known portrait of Micajah Harpe exists from life. An artist likeness created from his physical description mentioned in historical records.
- Born: Joshua Harper; Before 1768 (probably c. 1748); Scotland, Kingdom of Great Britain, or Orange County, Province of North Carolina, British North America
- Died: August 24, 1799 (aged 31–51); Kentucky, likely now Webster County United States
- Cause of death: Murder by decapitation with knife
- Other names: Micajah Harpe, Micajah Roberts
- Occupations: Bandit, highwayman, river pirate, plantation overseer, soldier, frontiersman
- Spouses: Susan Wood; Maria Davidson (alias Betsy Roberts; shared by both brothers)
- Children: 4

Details
- Victims: 39–50+

Wiley "Little" Harpe
- No known portrait of Wiley Harpe exists from life. An artist likeness created from his physical description mentioned in historical records.
- Born: William Harper; Before 1770 (probably c. 1750); Scotland, Kingdom of Great Britain, or Orange County, Province of North Carolina, British North America
- Died: February 8, 1804 (aged 34–54); Old Greenville, Jefferson County, Mississippi Territory, United States
- Cause of death: Execution by hanging
- Other names: Wiley Roberts, John Setton, John Sutton, John Taylor
- Occupations: Bandit, highwayman, river pirate, plantation overseer, soldier, frontiersman
- Spouse: Sarah "Sally" Rice (m. 1797) (shared by both brothers)
- Children: 4

Details
- Victims: 39–50+

Micajah "Big" Harpe, born Joshua Harper (before 1768 – August 24, 1799), and Wiley "Little" Harpe, born William Harper (before 1770 – February 8, 1804), were American murderers, highwaymen and river pirates who operated in Tennessee, Kentucky, Illinois, Mississippi and along the Natchez Trace in the late 18th century. They are often considered the earliest documented serial killers in United States history.

Loyal to the British Crown during the American Revolution, the Harpes became outlaws after the war and began robbing and killing settlers in the remote frontier west of the Appalachian Mountains. They are believed to have killed 39 people, and possibly as many as 50. As the Harpes' crimes gained notoriety, vigilante groups formed to avenge their victims, and they were eventually tracked down and executed around the turn of the century. Their savagery has since entered American folklore.

== Early life ==
Historians have noted the difficulties of differentiating between facts and subsequent legends of the Harpes and their exploits, as there are few reliably certain records of their lives from the time period. They are believed to have been born in what is now Orange County, North Carolina to Scottish parents. Micajah was probably born in or before 1768 as Joshua Harper, and Wiley in or before 1770 as William Harper.

Though many accounts identify the two as "brothers", it is also possible they were first cousins, named Joshua and William Harper, who emigrated from Scotland in 1759 or 1760. According to this theory, their fathers were brothers John and William Harper, who settled in Orange County, North Carolina, between 1761 and 1763. Like many Scottish settlers of the American colonies, the Harpers were Calvinists and avowed Tories loyal to the king.

Prior to the American Revolution, Big and Little Harpe's fathers may also have served in Tory militias in the War of the Regulation or "Regulator War" (1765–1771), during which colonists in the Carolinas took up arms against the continuing royal government interference by British colonial officials. When the Revolutionary War began, the Harpes' father(s) tried to join the Patriot American forces but were denied due to earlier associations with British loyalists. The negative treatment of the Harpe family by hostile Patriot neighbors may have contributed to Big and Little Harpe's feelings of persecution, as children, and their desire for revenge against people they considered rebellious "traitors" but who were still the British subjects of King George III.

Reportedly, after some time, political tensions between the Harpe family and local Patriots had escalated drastically, culminating in an attack on the family home by local Revolutionaries, in which the boys witnessed the lynching of their parents. Upon seeing this, the Harpe boys are said to have fled into the forest and hidden for a while, before they were found and rescued by members of the renegade band of Chickamauga Cherokee. After being brought into the tribe, the boys realized they held similar beliefs as their new Native caretakers, from whom they learned how to properly hunt, trap and dress wild game and forage on native plants, as well as how to steal livestock, raid properties, and various methods to "best" torture and kill enemies.

Around April or May 1775, the young Harpes left North Carolina and went to Virginia to find overseer jobs on a slave plantation. Big Harpe later traveled in the company of two women, Susan and Betsey/Betty Roberts, possibly sisters, both of whom bore him children. Little Harpe married Sarah "Sally" Rice, the daughter of a Baptist minister.

== Involvement in American Revolutionary War and American Indian Wars ==
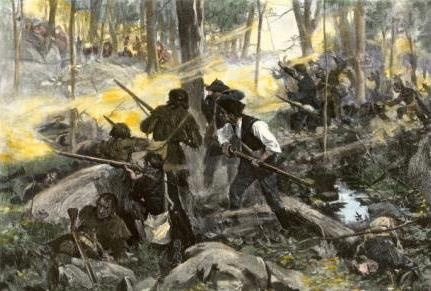
A painting of Loyalist and Patriot militia fighting each other at the Battle of Kings Mountain in 1780. The Harpe brothers with their Tory outlaw gang participated in the battle as irregular Loyalist militia, serving under the command of British Army Major Patrick Ferguson

Little is known of the Harpes' precise whereabouts at the outbreak of the American Revolution; according to an eyewitness account by Captain James Wood, of the Continental Army, they joined a Tory "rape gang" in North Carolina. These predatory, violently loyalist criminals took advantage of the general wartime lawlessness by beating, raping, stealing from, torturing and murdering all who they did not take kindly to, as well as burning and destroying property (especially the farms of Patriot colonists).

The Harpes' gang took part in the kidnapping of three teenage girls, with a fourth girl being rescued by Captain Wood. The Harpes also served as military associators, though were not provided soldiers' uniforms, weapons, or pay by the British government. Like many other Loyalist volunteers, they survived via hunting, foraging, robbery, and through the looting of corpses on battlefields.

Captain Wood's son was Frank Wood, a Patriot soldier of the Overmountain Men frontier group, and the older brother of Susan Wood (who was later kidnapped and made the wife of Micajah Harpe). Frank Wood claimed to have seen the Harpe brothers serving "loosely" as Tory militia at the Battle of Kings Mountain, in October 1780, under British commander Major Patrick Ferguson. During the three-hour engagement, Wood took aim at 'Big Harpe' but missed the target. Later, the Harpes served under the command of Lieutenant Colonel Banastre Tarleton's British Legion at the Battles of Blackstocks (November 1780) and Cowpens (January 1781).

Following the decisive British defeat by Patriot and French forces at Yorktown (1781), the Harpes left North Carolina, dispersing with their Native American allies, the renegade Chickamauga Cherokee, to Tennessee villages west of the Appalachian Mountains. On April 2, 1781, they joined the war party of 400 Chickamauga and attacked the Patriot frontier settlement of Bluff Station at Fort Nashborough (present-day Nashville, Tennessee), repeating the assault several months later, on either July 20, 1788, or April 9, 1793. On August 19, 1782, the Harpes accompanied a British-backed Chickamauga Cherokee war party to Kentucky at the Battle of Blue Licks, where they helped to defeat an army of Patriot frontiersmen led by Daniel Boone.

During the Harpes' early frontier period among the Chickamauga Cherokee, they lived in the village of Nickajack, near Chattanooga, Tennessee, for approximately 12 or 13 years. During this time, they kidnapped Maria Davidson and, later, Susan Wood. In 1794, the Harpes left their Indian habitation before it was destroyed in a raid by American militia. The Harpe brothers would later relocate to Powell's Valley, around Knoxville, Tennessee, where they stole food and supplies from local pioneers. They may have disguised their Tory past from their Patriot neighbors by changing their original name of "Harper", which was a common Loyalist surname in Revolutionary War-era North Carolina.

The whereabouts of the Harpes are unknown after the summer of 1795; by the spring of 1797, they were apparently dwelling in a cabin on Beaver's Creek, near Knoxville. On June 1, 1797, Wiley Harpe married Sarah Rice, which was recorded in the Knox County marriage records.

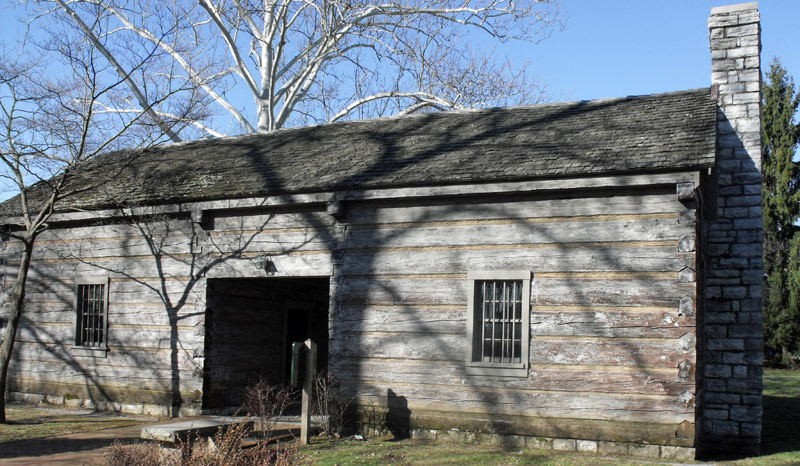
In 1799, the Harpe brothers were captured, held for trial, and subsequently broke out of the Kentucky state jail, in Danville, before they could be sentenced to death by hanging. This historical reconstruction of the jail, where the two were briefly held, was originally built by Isaac Hite as a log structure, having a central breezeway between two windowed prison cells and a dirt floor and stone chimney on one side.

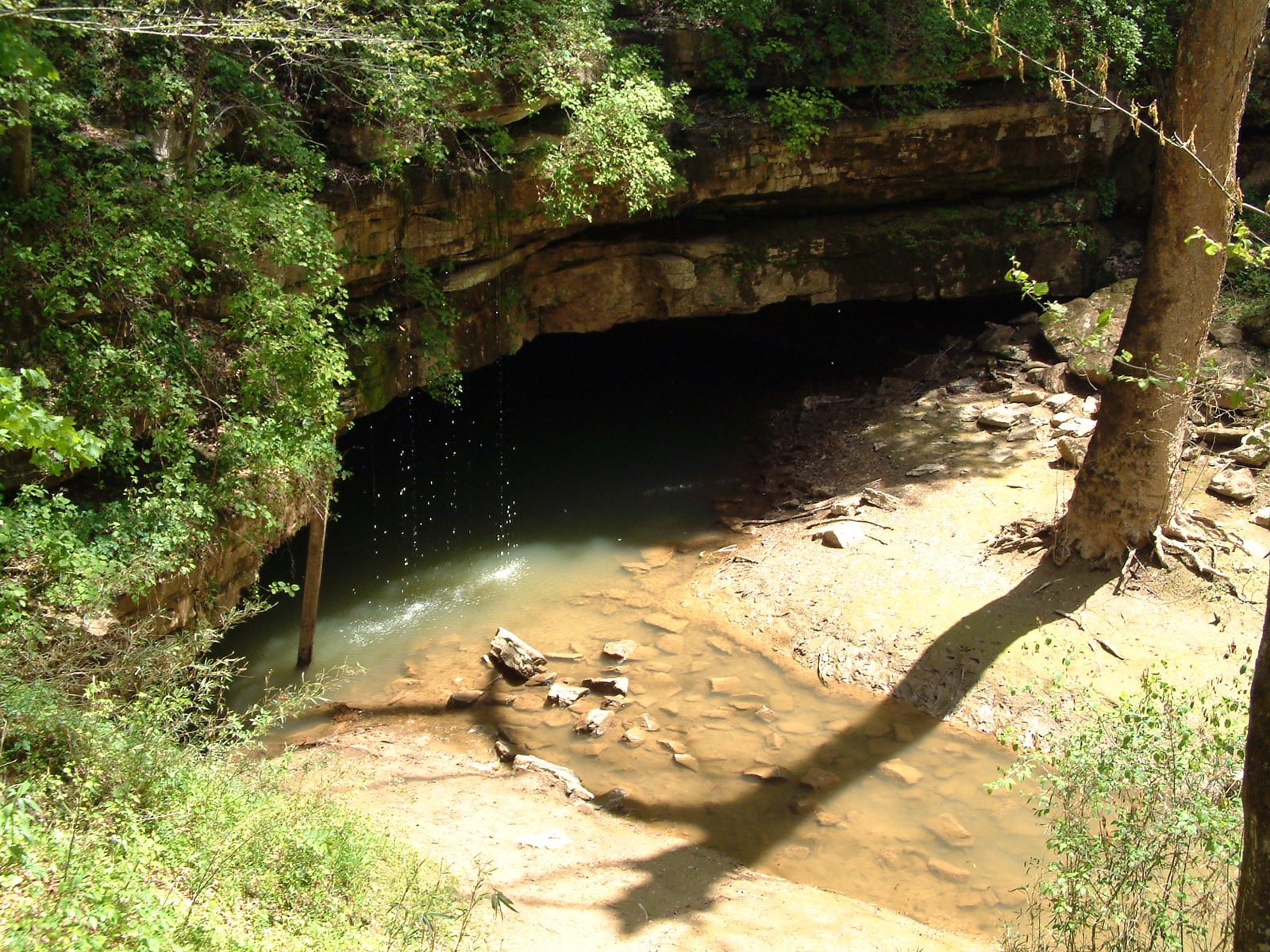
In 1799, near Mammoth Cave in Kentucky (the world's longest cave), the Harpes killed a young black man by slamming his head into a tree.

== Serial murders and atrocities ==
Sometime during 1797, the Harpes began a vicious crime spree through Tennessee, Kentucky, and Illinois. The Harpes later confessed to the killings of a confirmed thirty-nine people, but the estimated combined total, including unknown victims, may number more than fifty. They are alleged to have butchered anyone at the slightest provocation, regardless of age, including babies. What follows are the accounts of but a few of the murders the Harpes committed:

In 1797, while the two were living near Knoxville, Tennessee, the Harpes were driven out of town upon being charged with stealing pigs and horses. They were also accused of murdering a local man named Johnson, whose body was found in a river, covered in urine, with his chest cut open and filled with stones. This weighing-down became a signature corpse-disposal method seen in the Harpes' serial killings.

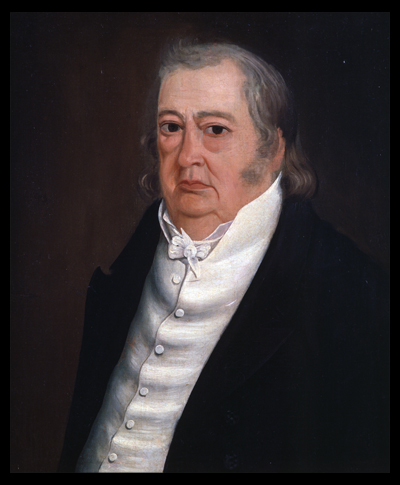
The second Governor of Kentucky, James Garrard on April 22, 1799, issued a $300 reward for the Harpe brothers' apprehension and deliverance back to Danville, Kentucky, for trial.

After being kicked out of Knoxville, the Harpes fled north, into Kentucky. They entered the state on the Wilderness Road near the Cumberland Gap. They are believed to have murdered a peddler named Peyton, taking his horse and some of his goods. In December, they murdered two travelers from Maryland. Next, a man named John Langford, who was traveling from Virginia to Kentucky, turned up dead; a local innkeeper pointed authorities toward the Harpes. The criminal pair was pursued, captured, and jailed in the state prison at Danville, Kentucky, from which they managed to escape; when a posse was sent after them, the young son of a man who assisted the authorities was found dead and mutilated by the Harpes, in an act of retaliation.

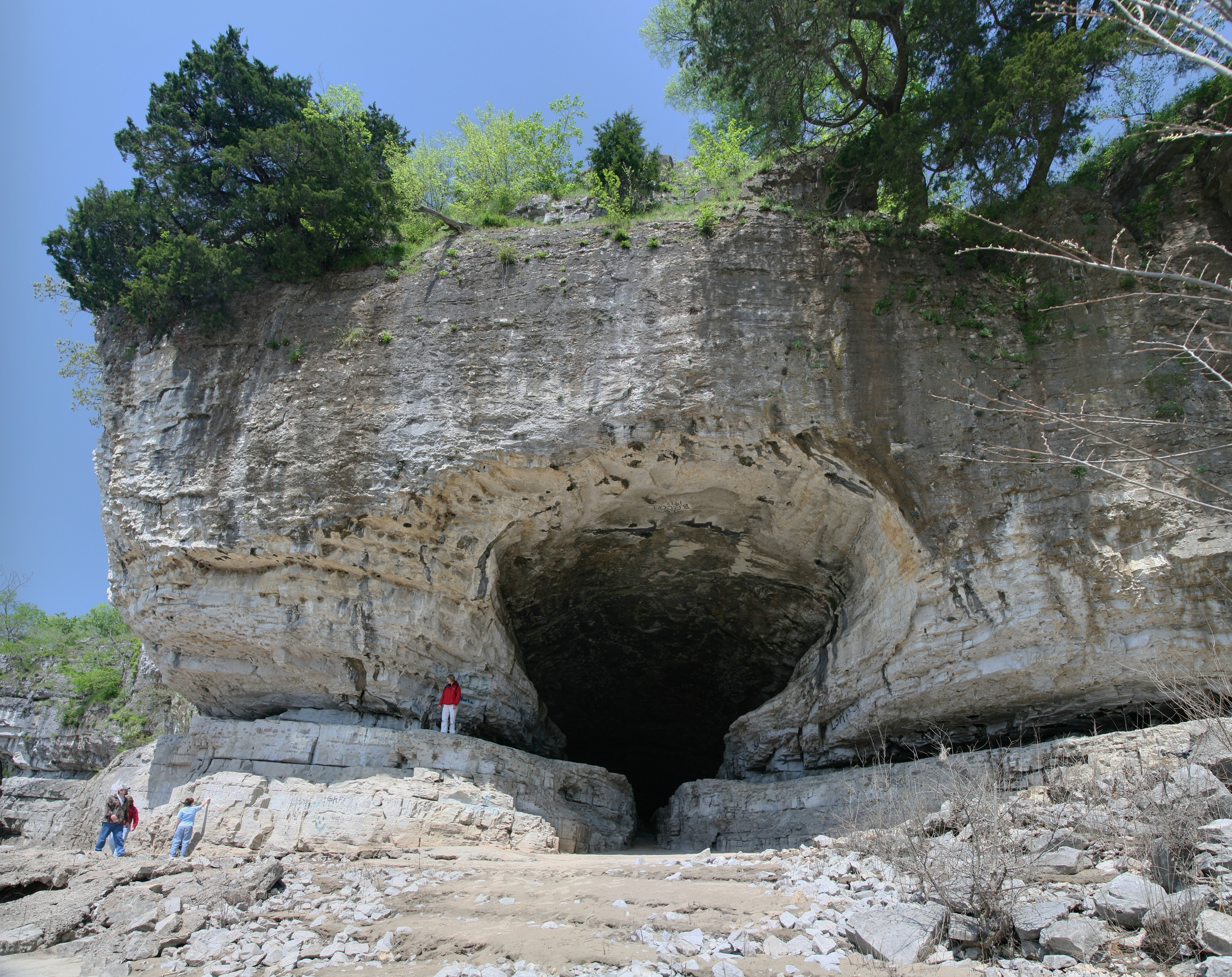
The Harpe brothers sought refuge from pursuing Kentucky regulators at the river pirate stronghold of Cave-In-Rock on the Ohio River, in the summer of 1799. After the murderous pair began to make a habit of taking travelers to the top of the bluff, stripping them naked, and pushing them off, the outlaw leader at the cave, Samuel Mason, forced the Harpe brothers to leave.

On April 22, 1799, Kentucky Governor James Garrard placed a $300 reward ($5,807 in 2025) on each of the Harpes' heads. While fleeing northward, the Harpes killed two men named Edmonton and Stump. When they were near the mouth of the Saline River in southern Illinois, they came upon three men encamped there and killed them. The pair then made their way to Cave-In-Rock, a natural cave on the bluffs above the Illinois bank of the Ohio River—and a stronghold of the river pirate and criminal gang leader Samuel Mason. A posse had been aggressively pursuing them but stopped just short of the cave, on the opposite shore, in Kentucky.

With their wives and three children in tow, the Harpes found a refuge with a crime gang led by Samuel Mason, who preyed on slow-moving flatboats making their way along the Ohio River. While the Mason Gang could be ruthless, even they were reportedly appalled at the actions of the Harpes. After the murderous pair were found to have a habit of taking travelers to the top of the bluff, stripping them naked, and pushing them off, Samuel Mason forced the Harpe brothers to leave.

The Harpes then returned to eastern Tennessee, where they continued their vicious murder spree. They killed a farmer named Bradbury, a man named Hardin, and a boy named Coffey in July 1798. Soon, more bodies were discovered, including those of William Ballard (who had been disemboweled and thrown in the Holston River), James Brassel (who had his throat viciously slashed and was discovered on Brassel's Knob) and John Tully. A Mr. John Graves and his teenage son were found dead, each having been bludgeoned with an axe, in south-central Kentucky. In Logan County, the Harpes killed a young girl, as well as a young slave and an entire family they found asleep in a camp.

In August 1799, a few miles northeast of Russellville, Kentucky, Big Harpe bashed his infant daughter's head against a tree because he was annoyed by her constant crying, his only crime for which he would, later, admit to feeling genuine remorse over. That same month, a man named Trowbridge was found disemboweled in Highland Creek. When the Harpes were given shelter at the Stegall home in Webster County, the pair killed an overnight guest named Major William Love, as well as Mrs. Moses Stegall's four-month-old baby boy, whose throat was slit because he, like Big Harpe's daughter, had cried. Upon Mrs. Stegall catching the Harpes in the act of killing her child, she screamed, for which she was also silenced and murdered.

== Physical appearances ==
The second Governor of Kentucky, James Garrard, issued a government proclamation on April 22, 1799, in the name of the Commonwealth of Kentucky declaring a $300 reward for their apprehension and deliverance back to Danville, Kentucky for trial. Governor Garrard gave a description of the physical appearances of the Harpe brothers:

MICAJAH HARP alias ROBERTS is about six feet high-of robust make, and is about 30 or 32 years of age. He has an ill-looking, downcast countenance, and his hair is black and short, but comes very much down his forehead. He is built very straight and is full fleshed in the face. When he went away he had on a striped nankeen coat, dark blue woolen stockings,-leggins of drab cloth and trousers of the same as the coat.

WILEY HARP alias ROBERTS is very meagre in his face, has short black hair but not quite so curly as his brother's; he looks older, though really younger, and has likewise a downcast countenance. He had on a coat of the same stuff as his brother's, and had a surtout coat over the close-bodied one. His stockings are dark woolen ones, and his leggins of drab cloth.

== Deaths ==
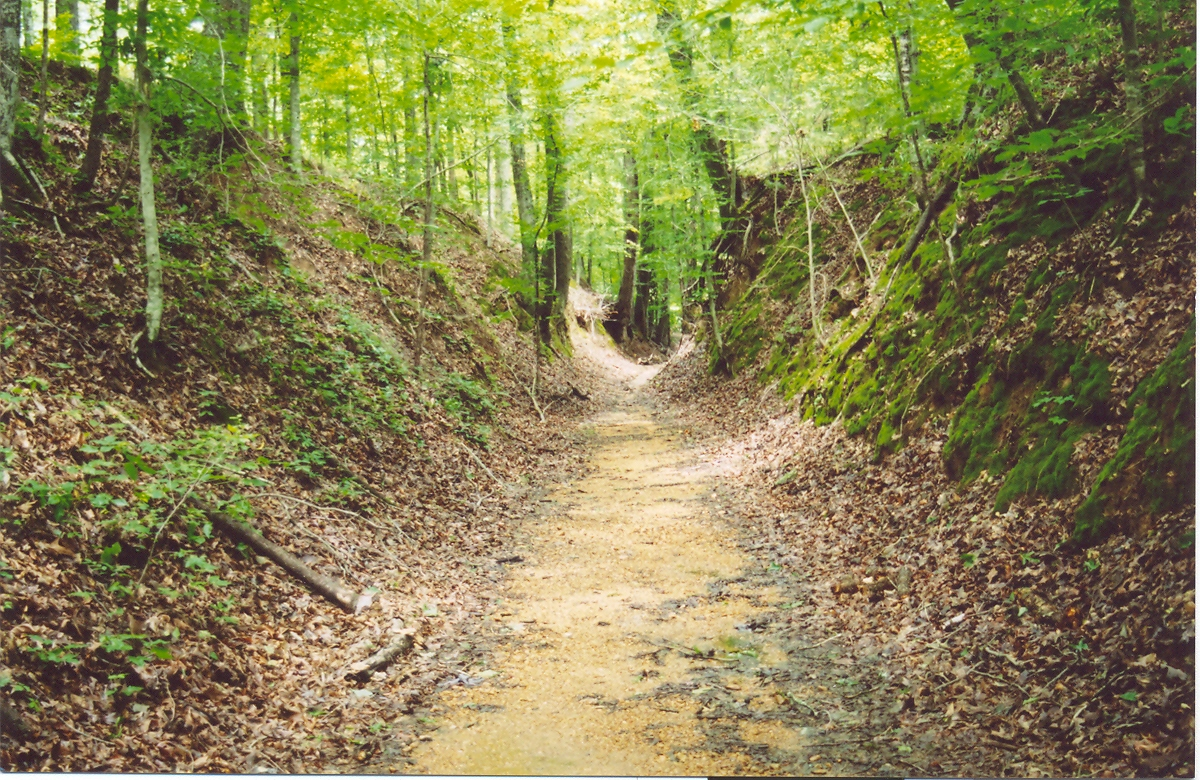
The old path of the Natchez Trace, where, between 1799 and 1803, Wiley "Little" Harpe, following the death of his brother Micajah, joined Peter Alston and the Samuel Mason Gang, committing highway robbery and murder against helpless and unsuspecting travelers, reported as crimes committed by "Mason of the Woods"

The Harpe killings continued in July 1799 as the two fled west to avoid a new posse, organized by John Leiper, which included the avenging husband and father Moses Stegall. While the pair was preparing to kill another settler named George Smith, the posse finally tracked them down on August 24, 1799. The posse called for the Harpes to surrender; they attempted to flee. Micajah Harpe was shot in the leg and back by Leiper, who soon caught up with him and pulled him from his horse, subduing the outlaw with a tomahawk in a scuffle.

As he lay dying, Micajah Harpe confessed to twenty murders. While Harpe was still conscious, Moses Stegall slowly cut off the outlaw's head. Later, the head was spiked on a pole (some accounts claim a tree) at a crossroads near the Moses Stegall Cabin that is still known as "Harpe's Head" or "Harpe's Head Road" along a modern-day highway in Webster County, Kentucky.

Wiley Harpe successfully escaped the confrontation and rejoined the Mason Gang pirates at Cave-In-Rock. Four years later, Wiley Harpe might have been captured along with the rest of the gang but went unrecognized because he was using the alias of "John Setton" or "John Sutton". Both Harpe and Samuel Mason, the gang leader, escaped, but Mason was shot. Afterwards, Little Harpe and another gang member, Peter Alston (who went by the name "James May"), son of the counterfeiter Philip Alston, tried to claim the bounty on Samuel Mason, although it is unclear whether Mason died from the wounds sustained during the escape or whether Harpe killed him.

Regardless, as they presented Mason's head, a Kentuckian recognized Harpe and Alston as outlaws themselves and the two men were arrested. The two soon escaped but were quickly recaptured, tried, and sentenced to be hanged. In January 1804, Wiley Harpe and Peter Alston were executed by hanging. Their heads were cut off and placed high on stakes along the Natchez Trace as a warning to other outlaws.

== Harpe women ==
According to Jon Musgrave, the Harpe women, after being freed from cohabitation with the brothers, led relatively respectable and normal lives. Upon the death of Micajah "Big" Harpe in Kentucky, the women were apprehended and taken to the Russellville, Kentucky state courthouse but later released. Sally Rice Harpe went back to Knoxville, Tennessee, to live in her father's house. For a time, Susan Wood and Maria Davidson (a.k.a. Betsey Roberts) lived in Russellville. Susan Wood remarried later, and died in Tennessee. Her daughter went to Texas.

On September 27, 1803, Betsey Roberts married John Huffstutler and the couple lived as tenants on Colonel Butler's Plantation. They moved to Hamilton County, Illinois in 1828, and had many children; the couple eventually died in the 1860s. In 1820, Sally Rice, who had remarried, traveled with her husband and father to their new home in Illinois via the Cave-In-Rock Ferry.

== In popular culture ==
William Faulkner in his novel Requiem for a Nun (1951), in describing the Paleolithic evolution of the area served by the Natchez Trace, prominently mentions the exploits of the Harpes and Mason, highlighting the butchery and savagery of the early history of Yoknapatawpha County.

In the 1941 film The Devil and Daniel Webster (or All That Money Can Buy), Big and Little Harpe are part of the "jury of the damned" that Daniel Webster must convince in order to free an innocent Jabez Stone.

In the 1956 Walt Disney Productions film Davy Crockett and the River Pirates, the Harpe brothers are portrayed by American actors Paul Newlan as Big Harpe and Frank Richards as Little Harpe.

The 1975 Broadway musical The Robber Bridegroom featured two characters (Big Harp and Little Harp) based on the Harpes. Big Harp is presented as a "cut off head" in a trunk, rescued by his brother when he was put to death for thieving. He is also the smarter of the two brothers.

The Harpe brothers were the inspiration for Big and Little Drum in Lois McMaster Bujold's 2008 novel Passage, part of The Sharing Knife series. Wiley Harpe is also the subject of a song on Bob Frank and John Murry's 2006 album World Without End.

In 2015, the Investigation Discovery television channel series Evil Kin aired an episode about the Harpe brothers called "Something Wicked in the Woods".

A short narrative of the Harpe brothers' lives appears in Selah Saterstrom's 2015 novel Slab. Tiger, the novel's main character, grows up with her family near the Mississippi River on the land of Wiley Harpe's estate off the Natchez Trace where Wiley Harpe "would dismember the corpses and make arrangements from their parts, ornamenting the land around his humble plantation". Tiger's grandfather installs a tire swing on a tree, to which he also affixes "a historical plaque: LITTLE HARPE HANGED HERE".

== See also ==
- List of serial killers in the United States
