= Mimi Lok =

American author, editor, and educator

- Born: Essex, England
- Education: San Francisco State University
- Occupations: author, editor, educator
- Writing career
- Notable works: Last of Her Name; Voice of Witness
- Notable awards: PEN/Robert W. Bingham Prize; California Book Award; Smithsonian American Ingenuity Award
- Website: www.mimilok.com

Mimi Lok is a British-Chinese author, editor, and educator. She is the recipient of a Smithsonian Ingenuity Award, A PEN America Award, and a California Book Award for Fiction. She is also the founder of Voice of Witness, an award-winning human rights and oral history nonprofit organization focused on amplifying marginalized voices through a book series and a national education program.

Her debut short story collection, Last of Her Name (Kaya Press, 2019) is the winner of the 2020 PEN/Robert W. Bingham Prize, and a California Book Award silver medal for first fiction, and was a finalist for The California Independent Bookseller Alliance ‘Golden Poppy’ Book Awards 2020, and CLMP Firecracker Award. The novella from the collection, "The Woman in the Closet" was a finalist for the 2020 National Magazine Award, Some of the key themes that the author contemplates are human connection, the Asian diaspora, and empathy. Her work has been published in McSweeney's, Electric Literature, Nimrod, Lucky Peach, Hyphen, and the South China Morning Post.

== Biography ==
Mimi Lok grew up in Essex, in a small town outside of London. Her parents were immigrants from Hong Kong. Lok's father worked in restaurants and in a glass recycling factory, and her mother worked as a farmer, construction worker, and later for high street fashion companies as a garment worker. She got involved in journalism after a post-university visit to Hong Kong when the sovereignty of Hong Kong transferred from the United Kingdom to China.

Lok studied visual arts before enrolling in a MFA in creative writing at San Francisco State University. After graduate school, in 2007, she volunteered as a researcher and interviewer with Voice of Witness, a book series started by Dave Eggers and Lola vollen, and collected oral histories for an anthology "Underground America: Narratives of Undocumented Lives". In 2009, Lok transitioned the series to a 501(c)(3) nonprofit, becoming its founding executive director and launching an education program.

She lives in the San Francisco Bay Area, California.
