= Orion You Came and You Took All My Marbles =

Book by Kira Henehan

- First edition
- Author: Kira Henehan
- Language: English
- Publisher: Milkweed Editions
- Publication date: 2010
- Publication place: United States
- Media type: Print (hardback & paperback)
- Pages: 259

Orion You Came and You Took All My Marbles is a 2010 mystery novel by Kira Henehan. It was shortlisted for the Believer Book Award and the Indie Booksellers Choice Award.

The novel is a mystery, and concerns a detective, Finley, who is investigating a puppet troupe led by a Professor Uppal.
