= Beguilement (novel) =

Novel by Lois McMaster Bujold

- Dust jacket of first edition (hardbound)
- Author: Lois McMaster Bujold
- Cover artist: Julie Bell
- Language: English
- Series: The Sharing Knife, Vol. 1
- Genre: Fantasy
- Publisher: Eos (HarperCollins)
- Publication date: 10 October 2006
- Publication place: United States
- Media type: Print Hardbound & Paperback & Audiobook
- Pages: 355 (first edition, hardbound)
- ISBN: 0-06-113758-8
- OCLC: 65197991
- Dewey Decimal: 813/.54 22
- LC Class: PS3552.U397 S54 2006
- Followed by: Legacy

The Sharing Knife: Beguilement is a fantasy novel by American writer Lois McMaster Bujold, published in 2006. It is the first book in the series The Sharing Knife.

== Plot ==
Fawn, an 18-year-old farmer, has run away from her family, because another farmer has impregnated her and made it clear that he will not acknowledge the baby as his own. Dag is a Lakewalker patroller, charged with killing young "malices". He first encounters Fawn hiding in a tree. Later, they meet again, when Dag saves her from some slaves of a malice. She assists him in killing the malice. In the process, the "ground" or life-force of her unborn child creates a new sharing knife, the device used to kill malices. Eventually, they realize that they are in love, against the customs of both their cultures, and the real story begins.

== Reception ==
Kirkus Reviews was luke-warm, finding "Flurries of action early on, devolving into stock fantasy-romance; overall, just about noteworthy enough to bring readers back for the promised conclusion." Jo Walton was positive about the series as a whole, praising the American setting and the small-scale focus of the stories.
