= Tod Wodicka =

American author (born 1976)

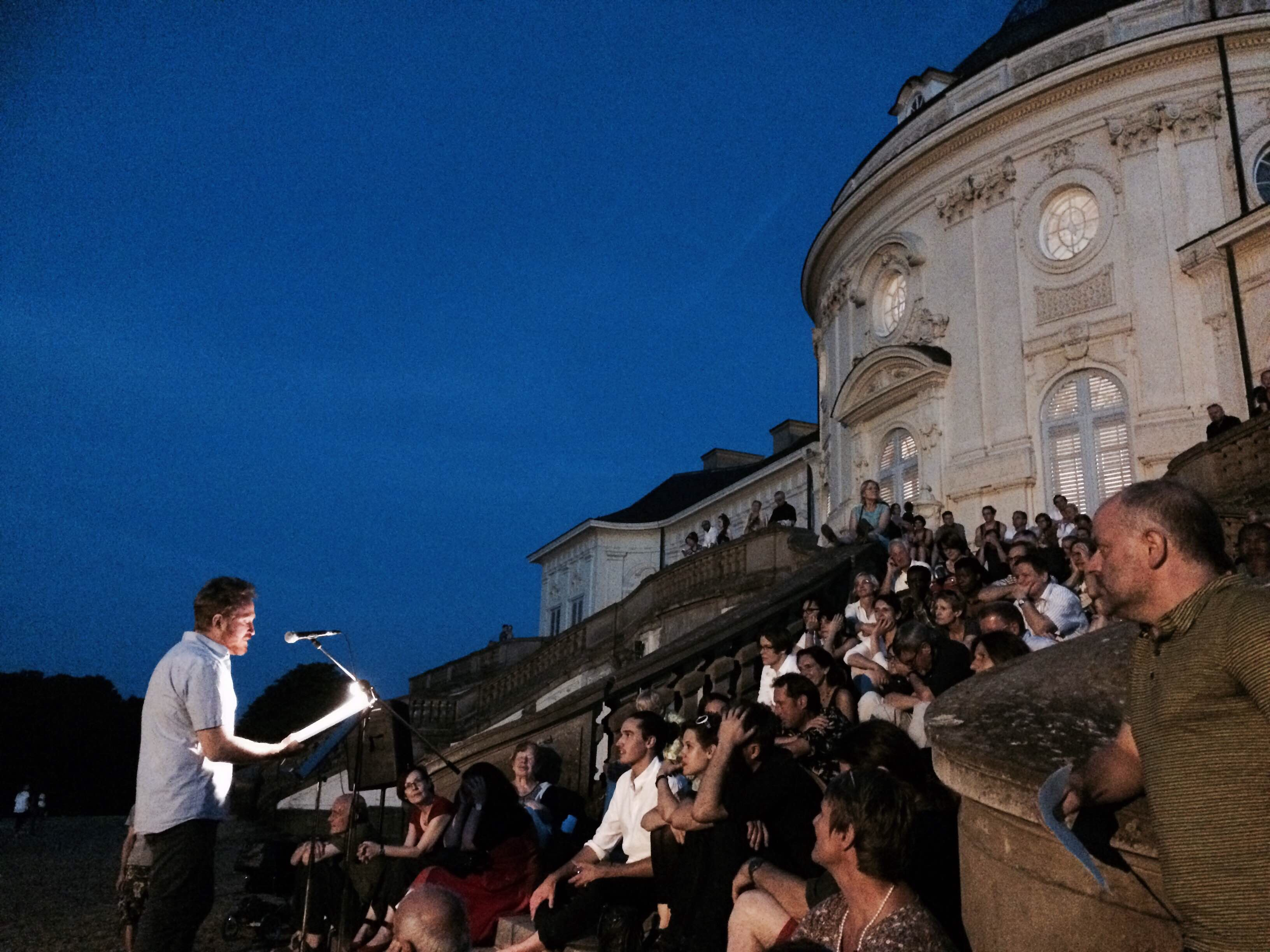
- Wodicka reading at Solitude Solitude, Stuttgart, Germany, 2016
- Born: May 30, 1976 (age 50)
- Education: University of Manchester
- Occupation: Author

Tod Wodicka (born May 30, 1976) is an American author who grew up in Queensbury, New York. He has lived in Manchester, England; Prague; Rock City Falls; and Moscow. He currently lives in Berlin, Germany.

He graduated from the University of Manchester in the UK.

== Work ==
=== Novels ===
==== All Shall Be Well; And All Shall Be Well; And All Manner of Things Shall Be Well ====
His critically acclaimed first novel, All Shall Be Well; And All Shall Be Well; And All Manner of Things Shall Be Well has been translated into German, Spanish and Dutch. (The title is a quotation from the Christian mystic Julian of Norwich, also quoted by T. S. Eliot in his poem Little Gidding.) The novel was short-listed for the 2008 Believer Book Award. The novel was published by Pantheon Books (US) and Jonathan Cape (UK); and Vintage Books paperback (US & UK).

All Shall Be Well; And All Shall Be Well; And All Manner of Things Shall Be Well tells the story of Burt Hecker, a medieval re-enactor from upstate New York who travels to Prague to find his estranged son Tristan. The book is a darkly comic story about Burt's devotion to another time and his doomed attempts at coming to terms with his own history.

==== The Household Spirit ====
His second novel, The Household Spirit, was published by Pantheon Books (US) and Jonathan Cape (UK) in June 2015. The Household Spirit is about the curious friendship between Howie Jeffries, a shy, 50-year-old recluse and Emily Phane, an irreverent young woman who suffers from horrific sleep paralysis attacks. It takes place in Queens Falls, the same fictional upstate New York town Wodicka wrote about in All Shall Be Well; And All Shall Be Well; And All Manner of Things Shall Be Well. The novel was awarded a Kirkus Star and was critically acclaimed in The New Yorker, The Financial Times, Esquire Magazine, The Sunday Times, Artforum, Tank Magazine and The Independent.

=== Other work ===
Tod Wodicka's essays, criticism and fiction has appeared in The Guardian, Granta, Tank (magazine), New Statesman, South as a State of Mind, AnOther Magazine, The National, Art Papers, BBC Radio 4 and BBC Radio 3. He wrote the afterword to David Tibet of Current 93's art book, Some Gnostic Cartoons. He has been a resident at Yaddo; a literary fellow at the Akademie Schloss Solitude in Stuttgart, Germany; and a writer in residence at Het beschrijf at Passa Porta in Belgium.

== Bibliography ==
- Wodicka, Tod (2008). All Shall Be Well; and All Shall Be Well; and All Manner of Things Shall Be Well. New York: Pantheon Books. ISBN 978-0-375-42473-1. OCLC 124165798.
- Wodicka, Tod (2015). The Household Spirit. New York: Pantheon Books. ISBN 978-0307377050.
