= Horizon (novel) =

Novel by Lois McMaster Bujold

- First edition
- Author: Lois McMaster Bujold
- Cover artist: Julie Bell
- Language: English
- Series: The Sharing Knife, Vol. 4
- Genre: Fantasy
- Publisher: Eos (HarperCollins)
- Publication date: 27 January 2009
- Publication place: United States
- Media type: Print (hardback)
- Pages: 453 (hardback, 1st edition)
- ISBN: 978-0-06-137536-1
- OCLC: 232977544
- Dewey Decimal: 813/.54 22
- LC Class: PS3552.U397 S57 2009
- Preceded by: Passage
- Followed by: Knife Children

Horizon is a 2009 fantasy novel by American writer Lois McMaster Bujold. It is the fourth in the tetralogy The Sharing Knife.

== Plot ==
With Fawn's prompting, Dag seeks out a teacher. A powerful groundsetter at local New Moon Cutoff Camp could be the answer to his prayers, but conflicts arise between the insular Lakewalker traditions and Dag's determination to be a healer for farmers. Dag, Fawn, Arkady the groundsetter and others embark on a long journey by wagon. They are joined by several other characters, some Lakewalker, some farmer, including Fawn's brother, Whit, and his wife, Berry. On their way up the Trace, a long wagon road, they encounter a malice, an evil being with great power. A Lakewalker kills the malice with a sharing knife. Fawn guesses that this malice was fleeing something even more powerful. That turns out to be a second malice. That malice is killed by Whit, aided by Fawn and Berry, which is unprecedented—no farmer has ever killed a malice without Lakewalker aid before.

At the end of the book, Dag and Fawn's vision of closer cooperation and understanding between Lakewalkers and farmers, as partners, is beginning to be achieved.

== Characters ==
- Dag Bluefield, née Redwing Hickory
- Fawn Bluefield, Dag's wife
- Whit Bluefield, Fawn's elder brother
- Berry Bluefield née Clearcreek, Whit's wife
- Remo — Pearl Riffle Crossing – patroller
- Barr — Pearl Riffle Crossing, Remo's younger patroller partner
- Arkady Waterbirch — New Moon Cutoff – maker, groundsetter
- Neeta — New Moon Cutoff – patroller, back from 2 years exchange in Luthlia
- Tavia — New Moon Cutoff, Neeta's partner
- Hod — Boy formerly beguiled by Dag
- Hawthorne Clearcreek, Berry's brother
- Bo, Berry's maternal uncle
