= Shailja Patel =

Kenyan writer

- Born: Nairobi, Kenya
- Writing career
- Language: English
- Notable work: Migritude
- Website: shailja.com

Shailja Patel (born 1970) is an Indian-Kenyan poet, playwright, theatre artist, and political activist. She is most known for her book Migritude, based on her one-woman show of the same name, which was funded by the Ford Foundation. CNN characterizes Patel as an artist "who exemplifies globalization as a people-centered phenomenon of migration and exchange." She divides her time between Nairobi, Kenya, and Johannesburg, South Africa. She is a founding member of Kenyans For Peace, Truth and Justice, a civil society coalition that works for an equitable democracy in Kenya. Her book, Migritude, was published by Kaya Press in 2010.

== Biography ==
Patel's poetry, performance art, and essays are often centered on the themes of imperialism, migration, globalization, colonialism, women, and the African and South Asian diasporas. Patel is a founding member of Kenyans For Peace, Truth and Justice, a civil society coalition that works for an equitable democracy in Kenya.

Patel noted in an interview with the Voice of America: "As an artist I move toward the forms that move me. I’ve been a poet from childhood. When I migrated to the United States and discovered slam, it blew me away, so I immersed myself in it. When I began to write pieces that were too long and complex to slam, theater was the natural space to move into. Now I’ve come full circle to writing again, making work—books, poems, political essays—that migrate freely across continents and languages, independent of my physical body."

== Migritude ==
Patel is best known for her book Migritude, based on the 90-minute spoken-word theatre show of the same name. The name of the play is a term Patel coined herself. Derived from the words "migrant," "attitude" and "negritude," it refers to, in Patel's words, "a generation of migrants who don't feel the need to be silent to protect themselves." The show is described on her website as using "her trousseau of saris, passed down by her mother, to unfold hidden histories of women's lives in the bootprint of Empire, from India to East Africa." The work derives heavily from her own experiences. Migritude explores themes of heritage, war, liberation and migration.

The show opened in the San Francisco Bay Area before embarking on a tour of Kenya, funded by the Ford Foundation. It was also presented in Vienna, Italy, Zanzibar, and on the closing night of the World Social Forum in Nairobi, in 2007.

== Recognition ==
Patel has appeared on the BBC World Service, NPR and Al-Jazeera. Her work has been translated into 16 languages. Her political articles have appeared in The Africa Report, Pambazuka News, Mercury (South Africa), and a range of other publications. She guest-edited a special edition of Pambazuka News: "Kenya: One Year On", in February 2009.

In 2012, she took part in Poetry Parnassus at the London Cultural Olympiad.

== Controversy ==
On 6 August 2019, a Kenyan court exonerated and awarded Tony Mochama 9 million shillings after he sued Patel for defamation. Mochama had been accused of sexual assault by Patel and Professor Wambui Mwangi. Patel and Mwangi chose not to report the assault to police, due to fear that the Kenyan justice system could not be trusted to run an unbiased investigation. They instead made their case over social media. Mochama, who maintained his innocence, said that it was a racially motivated accusation, made with the intent to destroy his reputation. The Kenyan court also ordered the two women to apologise to Mochama through the court within 14 days.

Patel was criticised for her response to hostilities between Israel and Islamic Jihad militants operating in the Gaza Strip on 14 November 2019, where Patel argued that due to its mandatory conscription laws "every single Israeli, from birth to death, [is] a de facto and de jure combatant" and therefore a legitimate military target.

== Publications ==
- Migritude, Kaya Press, 2010, ISBN 9781885030054
- Shilling Love, Fyrefly Press, 2002
- Dreaming in Gujurati, Fyrefly Press, 2000

=== Anthologies ===
- Neelanjana Banerjee; Summi Kaipa; Pireeni Sundaralingam (2010). Indivisible: An Anthology of Contemporary South Asian American Poetry. University of Arkansas Press. pp. 120–128. ISBN 978-1-55728-931-5.

=== Print ===
- Kenya's Three Tribes
- #KenyaRefuses
- ICC Kenya Trials: David vs. Goliath
- Seattlest: Shailja Patel Speaks Truth and Splits Fictions
- Review of Migritude on Smithsonian's Book Dragon
- Kenya One Year On

== TV and online video ==
- Shailja Patel performs "The Cup Runneth Over" at the 2014 Split This Rock Poetry Festival. YouTube, 18 April 2014 - uploaded by splitthisrock.
- TED@Vancouver: Drum Rider
- Migritude Interview on San Francisco's Bay Sunday TV show
- Shailja Patel, Nawal El Sadaawi and Ngugi wa Thiong'o at Gothenburg Book Fair, 2010
- "Eater of Death" performed at International Bioneers Conference
- KQED Spark! documentary on Migritude (8 minutes)

== Radio and podcast ==
- Poetry Parnassus, London Cultural Olympiad (Shailja's interview: 8.50 - 13.30)
- Bioneers Radio: "All Love Begins With Seeing"
- NPR's New America Now (Migritude interview begins at 30:10)
- KQED "Against The Grain: Migration and Empire"
