= Lars Iyer =

British novelist and philosopher

- Born: 2 May 1970 (age 56); London United Kingdom
- Occupations: Novelist, writer, philosopher
- Writing career
- Period: 2011 - present
- Genre: Philosophy
- Subjects: Maurice Blanchot, philosophy
- Notable works: Spurious, Dogma, Exodus

Lars Iyer is a British novelist and philosopher. He has published six novels and is best known for the trilogy Spurious (2011), Dogma (2012), and Exodus (2013). He has been shortlisted for the Believer Book Award and the Goldsmiths Prize. He has also written and published two nonfiction books about Maurice Blanchot.

== Life ==
Lars Iyer was born in London in 1970. He is of Indian and Danish parentage. He was brought up in Wokingham in South East England, where he returned after completing his undergraduate degree at the Manchester Metropolitan University in 1993. Despite being religiously unaffiliated, Iyer spent seven years living among monks in Patmos, Greece.

Iyer is a professor in creative writing at Newcastle University, where he has also taught philosophy. He is also a professor at the European Graduate School.

== Writing career ==
Iyer's short novels, Spurious (2011), Dogma (2012), and Exodus (2013), were all published by Melville House. Together, they make up the 'Lars and W. trilogy', also known as the 'Spurious trilogy', and are based on Iyer’s experience of academic life. Spurious was shortlisted for the 2011 Believer Book Award. Exodus was shortlisted for the 2013 Goldsmiths Prize.

Iyer has since published three more novels, Wittgenstein Jr. (2014), Nietzsche and the Burbs (2019), and My Weil (2023). These make up another trilogy, this time following "a journey through time and place – from the lively nightclubs of Manchester's past to the hollow symbols of aspirational culture and corporate homogeneity: Cambridge and Wokingham".

Iyer has published two nonfiction books about Maurice Blanchot, Blanchot’s Communism: Art, Philosophy and the Political (2004) and Blanchot’s Vigilance: Literature, Phenomenology and the Ethical (2005).

Iyer has also published many articles on philosophy and culture and a manifesto against literature and manifestos entitled "Nude in your hot tub, facing the abyss (A literary manifesto after the end of Literature and Manifestos)".

== Works ==
Fiction

- Spurious (2011, Melville House)
- Dogma (2012, Melville House)
- Exodus (2013, Melville House)
- Wittgenstein Jr (2014, Melville House)
- Nietzsche and the Burbs (2019, Melville House)
- My Weil (2023, Melville House)

Non-Fiction

- Blanchot's Communism: Art, Philosophy, and the Political (2004, Palgrave Macmillan)
- Blanchot's Vigilance: Literature, Phenomenology and the Ethical (2004, Palgrave Macmillan)
