= Duncan Ryūken Williams =

American Buddhist (born 1969)

- Born: September 19, 1969 (age 56); Tokyo, Japan
- Education: Reed College, Harvard University
- Occupations: Scholar, writer, Soto Zen Buddhist priest
- Notable work: The other side of Zen; American Sutra

Duncan Ryūken Williams (born September 19, 1969) is a scholar, writer, and Soto Zen Buddhist priest who is currently professor of religion and East Asian languages and cultures at the University of Southern California. He also serves as the director of the USC Shinso Ito Center for Japanese Religions and Culture. His research focuses on Zen Buddhism, Buddhism in America, and the mixed-race Japanese (hapa) experience.

== Early life and education ==
Duncan Ryūken Williams was born in Tokyo, Japan. The child of a Japanese woman and a British man, Williams spent the first 17 years of his life in Japan and England. As an undergraduate, Williams attended Reed College in Portland, Oregon. While attending Reed, Williams lived in a Zen Buddhist center, which inspired him to become ordained as a Buddhist priest. He was ordained as a Sōtō Zen Buddhist priest in 1993, when he became a monk at Kotakuji Temple in Nagano, Japan. At Harvard University, Williams was the university's Buddhist chaplain from 1994 to 1996, before his completing a Ph.D. in religion in 2000.

== Career ==
=== Teaching and affiliations ===
Williams has taught courses at Brown University, Trinity College, UC Irvine, UC Berkeley, and USC.

Previously Williams held the Shinso Ito Distinguished Chair of Japanese Buddhism at the University of California at Berkeley and served as the Director of Berkeley's Center for Japanese Studies.

Williams was the founding director of the USC Shinso Ito Center for Japanese Religions and Culture, USC's first Japanese Studies center.

=== Author ===
==== The Other Side of Zen ====
In 2005, Williams published his first monograph, The Other Side of Zen, with Princeton University Press. It was released in paperback in 2009. The title draws from Barbara Ruch's well-known essay, "The Other Side of Culture in Medieval Japan," which points out the importance of historical scholarship on "common culture" shared by the majority of the population."

The Other Side of Zen challenges traditional studies of Japanese Zen Buddhism (which tend to focus on well-known teachers, Zen meditation, Zen gardens, and solving kōans), instead examining the practices of everyday monks and laypeople and placing them within a larger social history in the Tokugawa and early Meiji periods. Analyzing temple records, Williams discusses how, as the overseers of these larger systems of affiliation and registration, Buddhist clerics had power over their parishioners which manifested in social and economic pressure to support the temple with which they were affiliated. Williams also includes many anecdotes and stories to illustrate how ordinary people's lives were shaped by government policies and religious practices, making the book accessible to a more general readership. One review of The Other Side of Zen declares, “This book is required reading for any student of Zen Buddhism or Japanese religion and will remain a standard reference for years to come."

==== American Sutra ====
In 2019, Williams published his second monograph, American Sutra, with Harvard University Press.

During World War II, the mass incarceration of Japanese Americans began with the FBI rounding up leaders of Japanese American communities; Buddhist priests were among the first to be incarcerated. American Sutra tells the story of Japanese American Buddhists (the largest group of Buddhists in the United States at that time in the context of anti-Japanese sentiment during World War II and draws parallels to contemporary challenges to religious freedom facing Americans today.

To understand and document this history, Williams conducted bilingual research, including translating four volumes of diaries written by a Buddhist priest incarcerated at a high-security camp in Santa Fe, New Mexico from 1941 to 1945 and obtaining and declassifying FBI documents that show that nearly 300 priests were picked up by the FBI after the bombing of Pearl Harbor. Japanese American scholars have noted how the book provides a new perspective on a familiar topic because of the bilingual sources Williams uses and the Buddhist framing of, for example, the Japanese American soldiers who served in the 100th Battalion/442nd Regimental Combat Team and the Military Intelligence Service during World War II.

=== Other projects ===
Williams has organized “Hapa Japan Festivals". These are multiple days celebrating the multiracial Japanese experiences globally. They typically include academic conferences, comedy shows, musical performances, film screenings, interviews, receptions, book fairs, art and photography displays, and an exhibit on multiracial Japanese Americans in the United States at the Japanese American National Museum in Los Angeles. Williams also published two edited volumes, Hapa Japan: History and Hapa Japan: Identities and Representations, in 2017. This is the first time so many essays have been published together on the history, identification, and representations of global mixed-race people of Japanese descent.

== Awards and honors ==
In 2011, the Japanese Ministry of Foreign Affairs and Consulate-General of Japan commended Williams for his work on a series of events at UC Berkeley's Center for Japanese Studies. The event series deepened the relationship between the United States and Japan, which is why he was commended.

In May 2015, Williams hosted Japanese Prime Minister Shinzo Abe, who met with staff and faculty at the Ito Center for Japanese Religions and Culture as part of his visit to USC, where Abe had spent three semesters as a student in 1978.

From 2016 to 2017, Williams served as the Executive Vice President and Planning Director of Japan House/LA, a public diplomacy initiative of Japan's Ministry of Foreign Affairs.

== Selected bibliography ==
=== Books (author) ===
- American Sutra: A Story of Faith and Freedom in the Second World War. Cambridge, MA: Harvard University Press, 2019. 400 pp. [February 2019 release]
- The Other Side of Zen: A Social History of Sōtō Zen Buddhism in Tokugawa Japan. Princeton, NJ: Princeton University Press, 2005. 241 pp.

=== Books (editor) ===
- Hapa Japan: Vol. 1 History. Los Angeles: Kaya Press, 2017. 520pp.
- Hapa Japan: Vol. 2 Identities and Representations. Los Angeles: Kaya Press, 2017. 452pp.
- Issei Buddhism in the Americas. Urbana-Champaign, IL: Asian American Studies Series, University of Illinois Press, 2010. 186 pp. [ Co-edited with Tomoe Moriya]
- Helen Hardacre and the Study of Japanese Religion. Nagoya: Nanzan Institute of Religion and Culture, 2009. 197 pp. (Special Issue of the Japanese Journal of Religious Studies) [Co-edited with Barbara Ambros and Regan Murphy]
- Local Religion in Tokugawa History. Nagoya: Nanzan Institute of Religion and Culture, 2001. 237 pp. (Special Issue of the Japanese Journal of Religious Studies) [Co-edited with Barbara Ambros]
- American Buddhism: Methods and Findings in Recent Scholarship. London: Curzon Critical Studies in Buddhism Series No. 8, Routledge/Curzon Press, 1998. 329 pp. [Co-edited with Christopher Queen]
- Buddhism and Ecology: The Interconnection of Dharma and Deed. Cambridge, MA: CSWR World Religions and Ecology Series No. 1, Harvard University Press, 1997. 467 pp. [Co-edited with Mary Evelyn Tucker] – Chinese-language editions (Taiwan, Dharma Drum, 2005; PRC, Jiangsu Education Publishing House, 2006); Korean-language edition (Gongguk University Press, 2005)

=== Books (translator) ===
- Putting Buddhism to Work: A New Theory of Economics and Business Management. Tokyo: Kodansha International, 1997. 131 pp. [Translation and Adaptation of Chukyū o suku'u keizaigaku: Bukkyō kara no teigen by Inoue Shin'ichi]
