= Rebecca Lee (writer) =

Canadian-American writer (born 1967)

- Born: May 5, 1967 (age 59)
- Education: Iowa Writers' Workshop (MFA)
- Occupation: Writer
- Writing career
- Notable works: Bobcat and Other Stories

Rebecca Lee (born May 5, 1967) is a short story writer, novelist, and professor, originally from Canada and now living in the United States. She is known for her debut collection Bobcat and Other Stories, which won the Believer Book Award and the Danuta Gleed Literary Award. She has also won the National Magazine Award and been shortlisted for The Story Prize.

== Life and academic career ==
Rebecca Lee is originally from Regina, Saskatchewan. Her father was a professor of chemistry. She took an MFA at the University of Iowa Writers' Workshop in 1992. She was a Jay C. and Ruth Halls Fiction Fellow at the University of Wisconsin from 1993 to 1994. In 1996, she began teaching at the University of North Carolina Wilmington, where she is an associate professor in the creative writing department.

In 1997, Lee was awarded the Rona Jaffe Foundation Writers' Award. She won a James Michener Fellowship in 1998. She held the Bunting Fellowship at Harvard University from 2001 to 2002. In 2023, she was awarded a Guggenheim Fellowship.

== Writing career ==
Lee's first book was the novella The City Is a Rising Tide (2006). Set in New York in the 1990s, the central character, Justine Laxness, works for a non-profit organisation setting up a retreat in China, where she lived with her missionary parents as a child. After personal and professional setbacks, she starts to embezzle money from this organisation to help an ex-boyfriend, James Nutter, make a hopelessly uncommercial but beautiful film.

Lee published short stories in literary journals, including Atlantic Monthly and Zoetrope: All-Story, for two decades before bringing out her first collection. One of these stories, "Fialta", won a National Magazine Award in 2001. The story is set at an artists' colony in Wisconsin, reminiscent of Taliesin. Lee has said that this story was a result of Francis Ford Coppola contacting her to ask her to write a story about young lovers whose love is thwarted by an authority figure.

Lee's first collection, Bobcat and Other Stories, was published in Canada in 2012 and in the US in 2013. It contains stories written over a span of twenty years. The collection won the 2012 Danuta Gleed Literary Award. It was a finalist for the 2014 The Story Prize. It won the Believer Book Award.

== Works ==
- Bobcat and Other Stories (2013)
- The City is a Rising Tide (2006)
