= Legacy (Bujold novel) =

2007 novel by Lois McMaster Bujold

- Cover of first edition (hardbound)
- Author: Lois McMaster Bujold
- Cover artist: Julie Bell
- Language: English
- Series: The Sharing Knife, Vol. 2
- Genre: Fantasy
- Publisher: Eos (HarperCollins)
- Publication date: July 2007
- Publication place: United States
- Media type: Print Hardbound, Paperback, Audiobook, eBook
- Pages: 377 (first edition, hardbound)
- ISBN: 0-06-113905-X
- OCLC: 144682268
- Dewey Decimal: 813/.54 22
- LC Class: PS3552.U397 S55 2007
- Preceded by: Beguilement
- Followed by: Passage

The Sharing Knife: Legacy is a fantasy novel by American writer Lois McMaster Bujold, published in 2007. It is the second book in the tetralogy The Sharing Knife.

== Plot ==
Legacy is the immediate sequel to Beguilement in the Sharing Knife series. It follows the pairing of farmer Fawn and lakewalker maverick Dag, after their marriage at Fawn's home in the previous volume. Where they, unencumbered by minor opposition, were married in accord with the customs of both groups. They travel to Dag's clan's home camp at Hickory Lake, where they find the expected prejudices against miscegenation between Farmers and Lakewalkers. Dag is called on to lead a group of Lakewalker patrollers against an advanced malice. Dag decides that confronting the malice is more important than trying to free several Lakewalkers who have been entranced in the mud-man-making process by which the malice produces its slaves. After Dag's group has killed the malice, Dag, himself, also becomes entranced. Fawn carries her heroine role through by thinking out a way to revive him, and the rest of the Lakewalkers.

Neither achievement carries enough weight with Dag's brother and mother to make them relent in their efforts to break this pairing. These two carry the role of villains, but they are drawn so that the reasons for their awkward quirks are clear.

Although their marriage, and Fawn's potential value to the camp are accepted by some of the Lakewalkers, The Dag-and-Fawn combination raises enough awkward precedents that they are about to be voted into exile when Dag subverts the process, stating that he intends to leave his home community in any case. Dag and Fawn then take as many portable assets as they can, and set out in chosen exile towards the southeast. There, Dag guesses he may be able to confirm his ideas about the near kinship of Farmers to Lakewalkers, and to find ways to combine their efforts toward the eradication of malices. These themes unfold in the next pair of books.
