= Last of Her Name =

2019 short story collection by Mimi Lok

- First edition
- Author: Mimi Lok
- Language: English
- Genre: Short story collection, Historical fiction
- Publisher: Kaya Press
- Publication date: October 22, 2019
- Media type: Print
- Awards: PEN/Robert W. Bingham Prize

Last of Her Name is a collection of stories by Mimi Lok, published by Kaya Press in October 2019. It won the 2020 PEN/Robert W. Bingham Prize for debut short story collection and is the finalist for 2020 National Magazine Award, The California Independent Bookseller Alliance ‘Golden Poppy’ Book Awards 2020, and CLMP Firecracker Award.

The collection explores stories of diasporic experiences in Asia and beyond, ranging from Hong Kong, the United Kingdom, and California. For instance, "The Woman in the Closet" (novella) tells a story about a homeless elderly woman seeking shelter in unlikely places, and "The Wedding Night" depicts societal morals surround unconventional relationships. Some of the key themes that the author contemplates are human connection, communication and empathy.

== Reception ==
Last of Her Name received praise from literary critics. Michael Schaub (NPR) writes, "Lok's literary debut is among the strongest of the year, thanks to her excellent writing and uncanny ability to create complex characters with the same stubborn flaws as real people"; and according to Alexis Burling (SF Chronicle), "Last of Her Name is a smorgasbord of powerful writing and angsty emotion wrapped into eight meditations on what it means to feel slightly out of place, either in your head or in your physical surroundings."

Judges of 2020 PEN/Robert W. Bingham Prize cite Last of Her Name:

The stories in Mimi Lok’s Last of Her Name are more than just deeply felt, richly imagined, and darkly comic; they feel necessary. In these pages, we find fractals. The microscopic contains the macro. The collection ranges all over our globe while distilling breathtaking, tiny moments of tremendous significance. Whether we are with estranged siblings over a meal to try to talk, or moving back and forth in time to unearth one family’s personal history, or in the closet with an elderly homeless woman listening in on a younger man’s affluent life, we are moving constantly between different strata—place, age, class, view of the world. But with this range and movement comes astonishing intimacy and emotional acuity, a determination in each instance to locate that which is most true and most human.
