= John Olson (writer) =

American poet and novelist

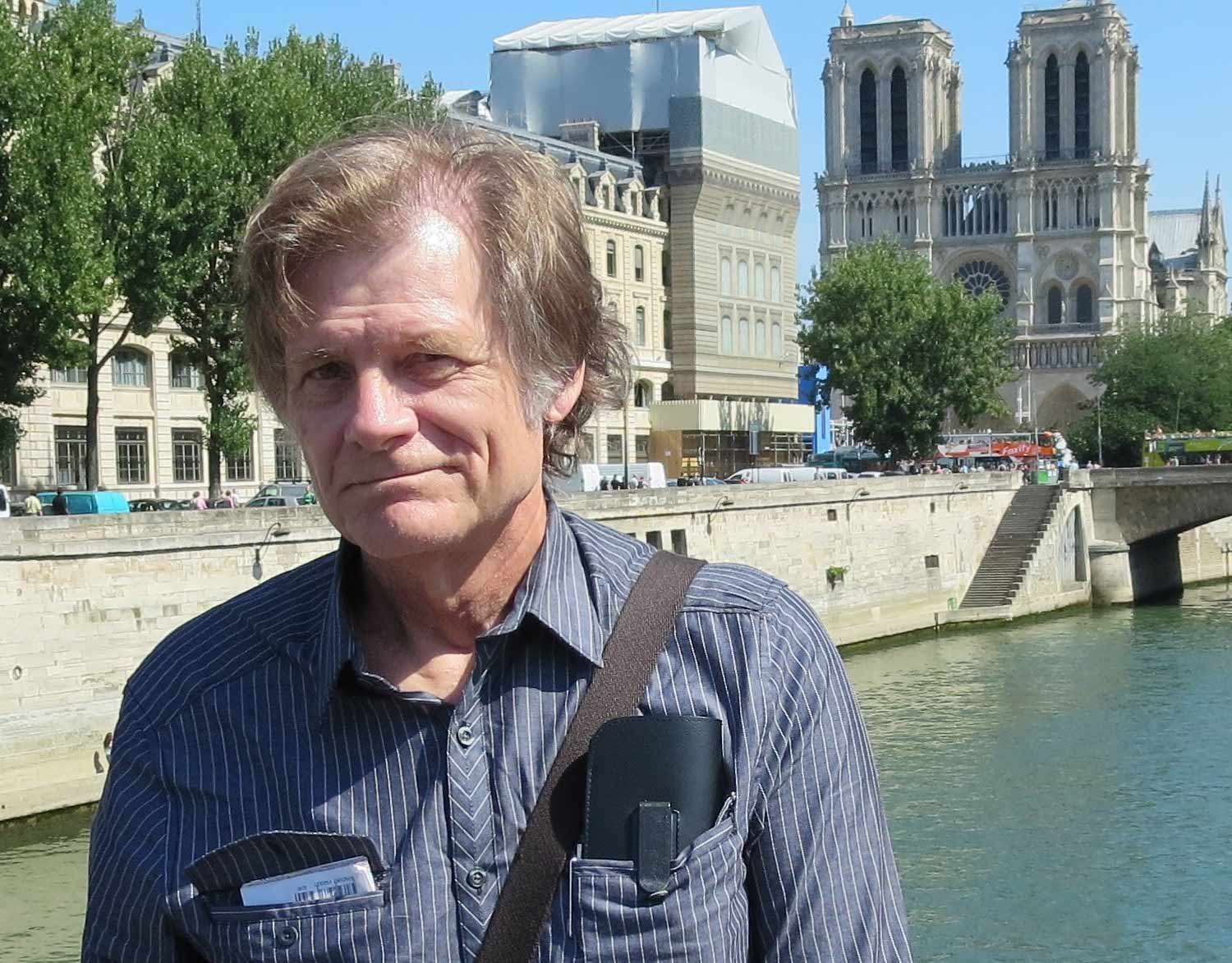
- photo by Roberta Olson, 2013

John Olson (born August 23, 1947 in Minneapolis, Minnesota) is an American poet and novelist. Olson has lived for many years in Seattle, Washington. He has published eleven collections of poetry and seven novels, including Souls of Wind, nominated for the 2008 Believer Book Award. In 2004, Seattle's weekly newspaper, The Stranger, for whom he has written occasional essays, gave Olson one of its annual "genius awards." His writing notebooks have been exhibited at the University of Washington. Olson's prose poetry has been reviewed in print and online poetry magazines. The poet Philip Lamantia said that Olson was "extraordinary...the greatest prose poetry [i've] ever read." and Clayton Eshleman said "he is writing the most outlandish, strange, and inventive prose poetry ever in the history of the prose poem."

== Bibliography ==
Poetry

- Weave of the Dream King (Boston: Black Widow Press, 2021)
- Dada Budapest (Boston: Black Widow Press, 2017)
- Larynx Galaxy (Boston: Black Widow Press, 2012)
- Backscatter: New and Selected Poems (Boston: Black Widow Press, 2008)]
- The Night I Dropped Shakespeare On The Cat (New York: Calamari Press, 2006)
- Oxbow Kazoo (Lawrence, Kansas: First Intensity Press, 2005)
- Free Stream Velocity (New York: Black Square Editions, 2003)
- Echo Regime (New York: Black Square Editions, 2000) (lineated poetry)
- Logo Lagoon (San Diego: Paper Brain Press, 1999)
- Eggs & Mirrors (Seattle: Wood Works Press, 1999)
- Swarm of Edges (Seattle: bcc press, 1996)

Fiction

- Unfinished World (Quale Press, 2025)
- You Know There's Something (Grand Iota, 2023)
- Mingled Yarn (Ekstatsis Editions, 2020 [auto-fiction])
- In Advance of the Broken Justy (Quale Press, 2016)
- The Seeing Machine (Quale Press, 2012)
- The Nothing That Is (Ravenna Press, 2010)
- Souls of Wind (Quale Press, 2008)

Essays

- Strange Matter: The physics and poetics of the search for the God particle, published online by The American Scholar, December 1, 2009.
- "A Garden in the Pocket", published online by "the glade of theoric ornithic hermetica"
- "Extreme Reading", published online by "the glade of theoric ornithic hermetica"
- "Gutenberg Blues", published online by "the glade of theoric ornithic hermetica"
- "Lightning on Paper: Poetry Is The Drug Of Choice" The Stranger, Oct 19–Oct 25, 2000 issue
