= Migritude =

2010 novel by Shailja Patel

- Author: Shailja Patel
- Language: English
- Genre: Biography and poetry
- Publisher: Kaya Press
- Publication date: November 30, 2010
- Publication place: Kenya
- Pages: 168
- ISBN: 1-885-03005-3

Migritude is a novel written by an American based Kenyan writer, poet and actor Shailja Patel. The Novel was her debut novel in 2010. The book talk about her journey from Kenya to the United Kingdom. The book includes political history, family history, poetry, and news coverage.

== About the book ==
Migritude focuses on how black African women and diasporic groups are positioned and repositioned in the language of global concern. By examining the subaltern discourse, this piece rethinks what is deemed "home" in the queer imaginary. To represent the subaltern, whose concerns are exemplified by the perpetuation of institutional violence upon their bodies, this paper critiques heteronormativity.
