= Next (Hynes novel) =

Book by James Hynes

- First edition
- Author: James Hynes
- Language: English
- Publisher: Back Bay Books
- Publication date: 2010
- Publication place: United States
- Media type: Print (hardback & paperback)
- Pages: 336

Next is a 2010 novel by James Hynes. It won the 2010 Believer Book Award.

Next received a starred review from Publishers Weekly, who called the novel "funny, surprising, and sobering."
