= Miranda Mellis =

American author, novelist, and professor

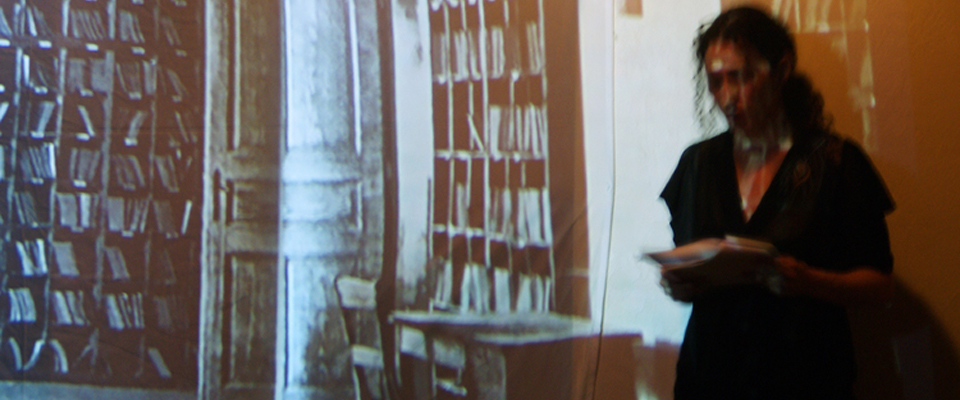
- Education: Naropa University; Brown University
- Notable works: Demystifications; The Spokes; None of This Is Real; The Revisionist

Miranda Mellis is the author of Demystifications, The Spokes, None of This Is Real, and The Revisionist. Her fiction, reviews, and essays have appeared in various publications including The Believer's The Logger, Harper’s, Conjunctions, the New York Times, Fence and elsewhere. She has received a grant from the National Endowment for the Humanities and the John Hawkes Prize in Fiction, and has been an Artist in Residence at the Headlands Center for the Arts and the Millay Colony. She co-founded and co-edited The Encyclopedia Project and once played in a band called My Invisible. She teaches at Evergreen State College. She earned her MFA in fiction from Brown University in 2004 and her bachelor's in writing and literature from Naropa University in 2001.

== Bibliography ==
- The Revisionist (2007)
- Materialisms (2009)
- None of This Is Real (2012)
- The Spokes (2012)
- The Quarry (2013)
- The Instead (2016)
- Demystifications (2021)
- The Revolutionary (2022)
