= The Sharing Knife =

2006–2019 novel series by Lois McMaster Bujold

- Beguilement (2006) and Legacy (2007). Passage (2008) and Horizon (2009). Knife Children (2019).
- Author: Lois McMaster Bujold
- Original title: The Wide Green World
- Cover artist: Julie Bell, Ron Miller
- Country: United States
- Language: English
- Genre: Fantasy
- Publisher: Eos (HarperCollins)
- Media type: Print, electronic
- No. of books: 5

The Sharing Knife is a romance/fantasy series by American writer Lois McMaster Bujold, published in 2006–2019. The original story grew so long in the telling that it was split into two volumes: Beguilement (2006) and Legacy (2007). Bujold then wrote a sequel, which was also divided, into Passage (2008) and Horizon (2009). The original title of the sequel was The Wide Green World, but Bujold and her publisher decided to make "Sharing Knife" the overall title, with the individual books given one-word subtitles and numbered 1–4. The fifth story in the series, a "short novel" titled Knife Children, was released as an electronic book on January 25, 2019.

== Background ==
Beguilement establishes a fictional space inspired by the part of North America Bujold grew up in: the country south of the Great Lakes. Recovery from a grand collapse of a prior high magical culture has brought population and technology back to roughly the state of the early 19th-century American frontier—minus gunpowder. The grand collapse is accounted for in terms of hubris, though not in technology but in spirit, for lack of a clearer term, with a caste of near-magical aristocrats all but wiped out in a series of wars with their spirit-eating creation and its hatchlings, termed malices or blight bogles.

A malice feeds on "life force" or, in the novel's terms, ground—which includes not only the internal order of living beings, but also the structural integrity of all matter, the emergent properties of form and function. It is able to mold man-like agents out of wild animals, called "mud-men", and to absorb the knowledge and skills of humans that it kills. A malice that emerges in areas away from humans is likely to become somewhat strange, consuming only animals. The role of the clans of Lakewalkers, descendants of the said near-magical aristocracy, is to patrol the lands around the Dead Lake (remnant of the several Great Lakes) and to kill newly hatched malices as early in their careers as may be. This they do with knives made from the thigh bones of their own dead, "primed" in the suicide of a mortally wounded or aged Lakewalker so that their death may be "shared" with the otherwise immortal malice. Hence the series title.

The Lakewalker caste's lifeway approximates Native Americans' hunter-gatherer-warrior nomadism after adoption of the horse, but differs by maintaining a single culture and language and an all-hinterland-spanning quasi-military order, the Patrol, which Lakewalker camps spend considerable resources to support. Southeast seacoast survivors from the commoner caste have been invited by them to re-settle the area south of the Dead Lake. Anyone not a Lakewalker is labeled a farmer. Farmers have little or none of the Lakewalkers' great talent and tool: "ground sense". With this, it is possible to detect and read details of all living things, as well as innate qualities of inanimate objects—the underlying truth of the world—to a distance varying with individual talent and training—including the presence of malices. In its absence, Farmers tend to take a jaundiced view of Lakewalkers' activities and abilities, and to discount the role of Lakewalkers in their own survival. Although both Farmers and Lakewalkers are human, and they speak the same language, there are physical differences. In addition to the Lakewalkers' ability to sense and manipulate ground, they are significantly taller than Farmers, and have a longer life-span.
