= Voice of Witness =

- Established: 2004
- Founders: Dave Eggers, Lola Vollen
- Headquarters: San Francisco
- Executive director: Natasha Johnson
- Website: voiceofwitness.org

Voice of Witness is a non-profit organization that uses oral history to illuminate contemporary human rights crises in the U.S. and worldwide through an oral history book series (published by McSweeney's) and an education program. Voice of Witness publish books that present narratives from survivors of human rights crises including: exonerated men and women; residents of New Orleans before, during, and after Hurricane Katrina; undocumented workers in the United States; and persons abducted and displaced as a result of the civil war in southern Sudan. The Voice of Witness Education Program brings these stories, and the issues they reflect, into high schools and impacted communities through oral history-based curricula and holistic educator support.

By using personal narratives, the series seeks to empower witnesses and survivors, generate awareness about social injustices and human rights issues, and provide documentation for educators, advocates, and policymakers. The editors of Voice of Witness utilizes interviews, primary source documents, and extensive fact-checking to construct the stories presented in each book. Dave Eggers, Voice of Witness co-founder and author, describes the project as "a partnership between the people telling their stories and the people transmitting them to the reader."

The Voice of Witness book series was founded in 2004 by the author Dave Eggers, and physician Lola Vollen, M.D. Mimi Lok joined in 2008 as Executive Director & Executive Editor, and turned Voice of Witness into a 501(c)(3) nonprofit. Voice of Witness is based in San Francisco, California.

== Reception ==
Critical reception for the Voice of Witness series has been positive. Publishers Weekly lauded Underground America as "no less than revelatory." The San Francisco Chronicle described Out of Exile as "[e]ssential...an admirable project." Chronicle reviewer John Freeman wrote: "Many of those who do survive (the Sudanese civil war) escape with nothing but their story, something this essential collection of oral testimony records and, in a realistic way, celebrates."

In its review of Surviving Justice, Boston's Weekly Dig praised the series' use of oral history: “The nature of oral history ... allows the exonerees’ stories to be poignant and indignant without the earnestness, false empathy or guilt that would normally poison such subject matter.” The New Orleans Times Picayune called Voices from the Storm a "powerful book" that "draws its strength from the real voices of real New Orleanians."

== VOW in the classroom ==
Voice of Witness has developed core standard-aligned educational resources, including lesson plans for teaching Surviving Justice and Voices in the Storm in high school classrooms, and for instruction on oral history. According to the Voice of Witness web site, the series has been utilized in both college and high school classrooms around the country, including Balboa High School in San Francisco, California, Bentley School in the San Francisco Bay Area, CUNY, Brown University, Valley High School Louisville, KY, and San Francisco State University. Voice of Witness and the Facing History and Ourselves organization have established a partnership to bring the series to additional classrooms.

== Notable members ==
- Mimi Lok, Co-founder & Executive Director
- Dave Eggers Author, Publisher
- Lola Vollen, M.D., Visiting Scholar, Institute for International Studies, University of California, Berkeley; Life After Exoneration Program, Executive Director

=== Founding board of advisors ===
- Mark Danner, Author, Professor, Graduate School of Journalism, University of California, Berkeley
- Harry Kreisler, Executive Director, Institute for International Studies, University of California, Berkeley
- Martha Minow, Dean, Harvard Law School, Harvard University
- Samantha Power, Professor, John F. Kennedy School of Government, Harvard University
- John Prendergast, Co-chair, The Enough Project
- Orville Schell, Former Dean, Graduate School of Journalism, University of California, Berkeley
- William T. Vollmann, Author
- Studs Terkel (Deceased), Author, Oral Historian

== Books ==
- Surviving Justice: America's Wrongfully Convicted and Exonerated (2005). Co-edited by Dave Eggers and Lola Vollen. ISBN 978-1-934781-25-8
- Voices from the Storm: The People of New Orleans on Hurricane Katrina and Its Aftermath (2006). Co-edited by Lola Vollen and Chris Ying. ISBN 978-1-932416-68-8
- Underground America: Narratives of Undocumented Lives (2008). Edited by Peter Orner. ISBN 978-1-934781-16-6
- En Las Sombras De Estados Unidos (2009) (The Spanish Language edition of Underground America.). Edited by Peter Orner and Sandra Hernandez. ISBN 978-1-934781-16-6
- Out of Exile: The Abducted and Displaced People of Sudan (2008). Edited by Craig Walzer. ISBN 978-1-934781-28-9
- Hope Deferred: Narratives of Zimbabwean Lives (2010). Edited by Peter Orner and Annie Holmes. ISBN 978-1-934781-94-4
- Nowhere to Be Home: Narratives from Survivors of Burma's Military Regime (2010). Edited by Maggie Lemere and Zoë West. ISBN 978-1-936365-02-9
- Patriot Acts: Narratives of Post-9/11 Injustice (2011). Edited by Alia Malek. ISBN 978-1-936365-38-8
- Inside This Place, Not of It: Narratives from Women's Prisons (2011). Edited by Ayelet Waldman and Robin Levi. ISBN 978-1-936365-50-0
- Throwing Stones at the Moon: Narratives from Colombians Displaced by Violence (2012). Edited by Sibylla Brodzinsky and Max Schoening. ISBN 978-1-936365-91-3
- Refugee Hotel (2012). Edited by Juliet Linderman, Photography by Gabriele Stabile. ISBN 978-1-936365-62-3
- High-Rise Stories: Narratives from Chicago Public Housing (2013). Edited by Audrey Petty. ISBN 978-1-938073-37-3
- Invisible Hands: Voices from the Global Economy (2014). Edited by Corinne Goria. ISBN 978-1-938073-90-8
- Palestine Speaks: Narratives of Life Under Occupation (2014). Edited by Cate Malek, Mateo Hoke. ISBN 9781940450353
- The Voice of Witness Reader: Ten Years of Amplifying Unheard Voices (2015). Edited by Dave Eggers. ISBN 9781940450834
- Chasing the Harvest: Migrant Workers in California Agriculture (2017). Edited by Gabriel Thompson. ISBN 9781786632210
- Lavil: Life, Love, and Death in Port-au-Prince (2017). Edited by Evan Lyon, Peter Orner. ISBN 9781784786823
- Six by Ten: Stories from Solitary (2018). Edited by Taylor Pendergrass. ISBN 9781608469574
- Say it Forward: A Guide to Social Justice Storytelling (2018). Edited by Claire Kiefer, Cliff Mayotte, Erin Vong, Natalie Catasús. ISBN 9781608469581
- Solito, Solita: Crossing Borders with Youth Refugees from Central America (2019). Edited by Jonathan Freedman, Steven Mayers. ISBN 9781608466184
- How We Go Home: Voices from Indigenous North America (2020). Edited by Sara Sinclair. ISBN 9781642592719
- Mi María: Surviving the Storm: Voices from Puerto Rico (2021). Edited by Marci Denesiuk, Ricia Anne Chansky. ISBN 9781642596533
