= Selah Saterstrom =

American author

- Occupations: Novelist, writer
- Website: selahsaterstrom.org

Selah Saterstrom is an American author, originally from the south. She is the author of five books: Rancher (Burrow Press, 2021), Ideal Suggestions: Essays in Divinatory Poetics (Essay Press, 2017), Slab (Coffee House Press, 2015), The Meat and Spirit Plan (Coffee House Press, 2007), and The Pink Institution (Coffee House Press, 2004). Her work has twice been nominated for the Believer Book Award. She is a full professor at the University of Denver.

== Bibliography ==
- The Pink Institution (Coffee House Press, 2004) ISBN 9781566891554
- The Meat and Spirit Plan (Coffee House Press, 2007) ISBN 9781566892018
- Slab (Coffee House Press, 2015) ISBN 9781566893954
- Ideal Suggestions: Essays in Divinatory Poetics (Essay Press, 2017) ISBN 9780996922913
- Rancher (Burrow Press, 2021) ISBN 9781941681169
