= James Hynes =

American novelist (born 1955)

- Born: August 23, 1955 (age 71); Okemos, Michigan, U.S.
- Education: University of Iowa (MFA); College of Literature, Science, and the Arts (BA)
- Occupation: Novelist
- Writing career
- Genre: Fiction
- Website: Official website

James Hynes (born August 23, 1955) is an American novelist.

== Biography ==
Hynes was born in Okemos, Michigan, and grew up in Big Rapids, Michigan. He currently resides in Austin, Texas, where he has taught creative writing at the University of Texas. He has also taught at the Iowa Writers' Workshop, the University of Michigan, Miami University, and Grinnell College. Hynes received a B.A. in philosophy from the University of Michigan and an M.F.A. from the Iowa Writers' Workshop at the University of Iowa.

His first novel, The Wild Colonial Boy, deals with terrorism in Northern Ireland. Hynes' three subsequent books, Publish and Perish, The Lecturer's Tale and Kings of Infinite Space, combine satire and horror. His novel Next was published in 2010, and his sixth book, Sparrow, a historical novel about a slave in Late Antiquity, was published in 2023 in Britain, Canada, the United States, and Germany. His reviews and literary essays have appeared in The Washington Post, The New York Times, Boston Review, and the online magazine Salon. In the 1980s he wrote about television for the Michigan Voice, Mother Jones, and In These Times.

== Works ==
- The Wild Colonial Boy (Atheneum, 1990)
- Publish and Perish: Three Tales of Tenure and Terror (Picador USA, 1997)
- The Lecturer's Tale (Picador USA, 2001)
- Kings of Infinite Space (St. Martin's Press, 2004)
- Next (Little, Brown and Company, 2010)
- Sparrow (Picador, 2023)
