= Shōson Nagahara =

Japanese-American writer (Los Angeles, California)

- Born: Hideaki Nagahara; 1901; Hiroshima Prefecture
- Died: unknown
- Writing career
- Language: Japanese

Shōson Nagahara (永原 宵村) was the pen name of Hideaki Nagahara (Japanese: 永原 秀秋, born 1901), a Japanese-American writer who immigrated to Los Angeles, California in the 1920s. He is known for writing about Los Angeles neighborhood of Little Tokyo in the Japanese language for Japanese readers. His novels are unusual in having contemporary descriptions of life in Los Angeles in the 1920s.

== Personal life ==
He was born in Hiroshima Prefecture. His birth name was Hideaki Nagahara. Shōson Nagahara was his pen name. He was age 17 when he arrived in Seattle, Washington in the summer of 1918. In 1920, he was living in a boarding house in Los Angeles. It is uncertain what happened to him after 1928.

== Career ==
His first novel, Lament in the Night, appeared in 1925. Its protagonist was a day laborer, Ishikawa Sakuzō, seeking work in Los Angeles. The work has been called a "naturalist noir masterpiece", and was reviewed in "the regional Japanese-language press."

Shōson went on to produce a serial novel, under the sponsorship of Rafu Shimpo, The Tale of Osato. It appeared from November 1925 to May 1926.

== Works ==
- Lament in the Night. Sōdosha : Los Angeles, 1925
- The Tale of Osato

== See also ==
History of the Japanese in Los Angeles
