= Atomik Aztex =

Novel by Sesshu Foster

- Author: Sesshu Foster
- Genre: Postcolonial, metafictional alternate history
- Publication date: 2005

Atomik Aztex is a 2005 speculative fiction alternate history novel by Japanese-American Sesshu Foster. The novel combines elements of speculative fiction, alternate history, postcolonial literature, and metafiction. The narrative deals with interconnected alternate timelines, one of which is set in a reality where the Aztec Empire defeated the Spanish and then conquered Europe.

== Plot ==
Zenzontli is an Aztec warrior from the timeline in which the Aztecs conquered Europe, and rule over a North American empire. In that universe, he trades in European slaves who are ritually sacrificed. At one point, Zenzontli and other warriors are sent to an alternate universe, where they have to defeat the Nazis at the Battle of Stalingrad in a timeline where the Europeans conquered the Aztecs.

Meanwhile, Zenzontli and others experience visions of our universe, where the Spanish subjugated the indigenous peoples of the Americas. In this universe, they are illegal Mexican immigrants who work in a meatpacking plant. Zenzontli finds his job as a slaughterer to be similar to his role as a sacrificer in his own universe. Other versions of Zenzontli are shown to occur across other timelines, all interlinked.

== Structure and themes ==
The novel switches between multiple timelines in a setting where many universes exist in an "ever expanding omniverse". The narrative takes a postcolonial approach to time, positing a post-quantum cosmology in which time is circular. Foster describes the function of cyclical time in these universes as "78 rpm realities". This is inspired by the Aztec concept of cyclical time.

It is a work of historiographic metafiction. The novel is written in a postmodern style, with alternative spellings and slang. The various timelines are expressed in a disjointed manner, reflecting both the mental state of Zenzontli and the simultaneous nature of events across universes.

Its narrative explores contemporary issues of economic and racial disparities in modern urban communities. The prominence of human sacrifice and other forms of institutionalized violence in the Aztec universe is used to reflect and criticize the violence which exists in our society. The secondary timeline of the novel, which takes place in modern California, is shown to be steeped in inequality and violence. A major theme of the novel is civilization, and the inhumanity of colonization and events like the Spanish conquest of the New World and the Holocaust.

== Reception ==
The book received praise for its handling of alternate realities but its confusing and postmodern writing style was criticized by some.
