= Sesshu Foster =

American poet (born 1957)

- Born: September 5, 1957 (age 69); Los Angeles, California, U.S.
- Education: MFA, Iowa Writers' Workshop
- Occupations: Poet and novelist
- Notable work: Atomik Aztex

Sesshu Foster (born April 5, 1957) is an American poet and novelist.

== Early life ==
Sesshu Foster is a Japanese-American poet of white and Nisei descent. He grew up on Los Angeles’ East Side, California, and came of age in the primarily Chicano neighborhood of City Terrace, where he was influenced by local community organizing and political artmaking. Foster credits moving to City Terrace the same year as the Watts Riots (1965) with helping to shape his writing voice and concern with social and racial justice and the impacts of gentrification.

== Career ==
Foster has taught composition and literature in East LA since 1985, and has also taught at the University of Iowa, the California Institute of the Arts, the University of California, Santa Cruz and the Jack Kerouac School's Summer Writing Program. He was in residence at California State University, Los Angeles.

He has taught composition and literature in East L.A. for 30 years. He holds an MFA from the Iowa Writers' Workshop, where he also taught; he has also been an instructor at the California Institute for the Arts and the University of California, Santa Cruz. Before beginning his teaching career, Foster worked as a firefighter in Colorado's Rocky Mountains and in Wyoming for several seasons.

=== Teaching, firefighting, and other careers ===
While Foster has boasted work as a strip-club bouncer and a summer firefighter in Colorado, his life as a poetry teacher has been the most consistent. Foster has taught writing at the University of Iowa, California Institute for the Arts, the Jack Kerouac School's Summer Writing Program, the University of California, Santa Cruz, and English for a number of years at a school in Boyle Heights before beginning his long-tenured career in 1985 as a composition and literature in East L.A. at the Francisco Bravo Medical Magnet High School. There, he is active in the teachers' union and notes that his life as a teacher and poet are a collaborative work with his wife, Dolores Bravo.

Foster notes that his earlier careers were inspired by books. He became a fire lookout after reading The Dharma Bums by Jack Kerouac and fought forest fires in Colorado and Wyoming. When he was 19 working as a bouncer, he made his first attempt at reading Herman Melville's Moby Dick. He said that he did not enjoy it at first, but later found that the University of California Press Edition was "like NOT getting struck by lightning while a lightning storm strikes all around you on the north edge of the Grand Canyon."

== Writing ==
Foster is primarily known for poetry, although he has published two experimental novels and edited an anthology. His most recent books include: Atomik Aztex, a novel; World Ball Notebook; and City of the Future. Forthcoming in 2020 is a second work of speculative fiction, ELADATL: A History of the East Los Angeles Dirigible Air Transport Lines. His work often employs experimental or hybrid formal constraints (in World Ball Notebook, the conceit of the "game"; the prose poems of City Terrace Field Manual; the speculative hybrid novel forms in both Atomik Aztex and ELADATL.)

Foster's work has been published in The Oxford Anthology of Modern American Poetry, Language for a New Century: Poetry from the Middle East, Asia and Beyond, and State of the Union: 50 Political Poems.

In "review of 'made in l.a.'’ at the ucla hammer museum", Foster critiques the omission of artists of color in an exhibit lauded by critics. The poem is at once a litany of absence as memory as much as it speaks to a firm disagreement with a present (and president) who echo the same histories he experienced 20 years before.

In addition, Foster is a prolific postcard writer, a hobby that began by exchanging letters with his father as a child. Foster has described postcard poems as "a form of diary or journaling, reflection— and also a way of saying 'hi' to people from far." Additionally, Foster notes that postcard poems afford "often arbitrary juxtaposition" of image and text in a non-linear, and non-standardized manner. This mode of nonlinear epistolary writing influenced Foster's City of The Future.

== Awards ==
- 2019: Firecracker Award from Community of Literary Magazines and Presses for City of the Future
- 2010: American Book Award for World Ball Notebook
- 2009: Asian American Literary Award for Poetry for World Ball Notebook
- 2005: Believer Book Award for Atomik Aztex
- 1990: American Book Award for Invocation LA: Urban Multicultural Poetry
- finalist for a PEN Center West Poetry Prize, for City Terrace Field Manual
- finalist for the Paterson Poetry Prize for City Terrace Field Manual

== Articles and poems ==
- "Letter Before Leaving for a Reforestation Brigade", Minnesota Review, 1986
- "This Poem Cannot Be Written", Radical Teacher, 1987
- "from Visitation: Sites Where the Essence of the Soul Has Been Extracted", Radical Teacher, 1987
- "The Organic Garden Was Indeed Beautiful", "This Poem Cannot Be Written", "Chico?", "Visitation: Sites Where the Essence of the Soul Has Been Extracted", “Sometimes", The Journal of Ethnic Studies, 1987
- "High Blood/Pressure", Off Our Backs, 1988
- "Fresh Harvest: New Multicultural Poetry", Northwest Review, 1990
- "The Marl of the New Diaspora: Premonitions; The Kaya Anthology of New Asian North American Poetry, edited by Walter K. Lew", rev. by Mira Chieko Shimabukuro, International Examiner, 1996 (anthology)
- Another City: Writing from Los Angeles, edited by David L. Ulin, 2001 (anthology)
- "Interview with Juan Fish (Supposedly)", Mandorla: Nueva Escritura de las Américas, 2009
- "review of made in l.a. at the ucla hammer museum", personal blog, 2014
- "Movie Version", Latinx Writing Los Angeles, University of Nebraska Press, 2018

== Selected works ==
- Angry Days, West End Press. 1987. ISBN 9780931122460
- Akrilica. Juan Felipe Herrera, translated by Stephen Kessler & Sesshu Foster with Dolores Bravo, Magaly Fernandez. Alcatraz Editions, 1989.
- City Terrace Field Manual. Kaya/Muae. 1996. ISBN 978-1-885030-19-1.
- Atomik Aztex. City Lights Publishers. 2005. ISBN 978-0-87286-440-5.
- American Loneliness: Selected Poems (Beyond Baroque, 2006)
- World Ball Notebook. City Lights Publishers. 2009. ISBN 978-0-87286-467-2.
- City of the Future. Kaya Press. 2018. ISBN 978-1885030559
- ELADATL: A History of the East Los Angeles Dirigible Air Transport Lines (City Lights Publishers, 2021, April 6) ISBN 9780872867703.

=== Anthologies ===
- Michelle T. Clinton; Sesshu Foster; Naomi Quinonez, eds. (July 1989). Invocation L.A.: Urban Multicultural Poetry. West End Press. ISBN 978-0-931122-52-1.
- Walter K. Lew, ed. (January 1, 1995). Premonitions:The Kaya Anthology of New Asian North American Poetry. Kaya Production.
- Cary Nelson, ed. (January 13, 2000). Anthology of Modern American Poetry. New York: Oxford University Press. ISBN 978-0-19-512271-8.
- Tina Chang; Nathalie Handal; Ravi Shankar, eds. (April 17, 2008). Language for a New Century: Contemporary Poetry from the Middle East, Asia, and Beyond. W.W. Norton & Co. ISBN 978-0-393-33238-4.
- State of the Union: 50 Political Poems. Wave books. September 2008. ISBN 978-1-933517-33-9.
