= Laurie Lola Vollen =

American scholar and human rights activist

Laurie Lola Vollen is an American scholar and human rights activist. She specializes in the repercussions of large-scale human rights abuses.

== Background ==
Vollen graduated from Princeton in 1978 as a psychology major.

Vollen began her career as a doctor in private practice. She then directed Arizona State University's health center.

In 1992, Vollen spent a three-week vacation organizing a vaccination program for children in Somalia with Save the Children. That experience convinced her that she needed to change her focus to do more public service.

Beginning in 1996, Vollen spent four years working in Bosnia with Physicians for Human Rights.

Vollen founded the Center for Communities Emerging from Injustice (CCEI), a Berkeley-based non-profit that addresses how communities can deal with injustice and human-rights abuses. CCEI pursues DNA identification after ethnic cleansing and genocide to help families find closure.

In 2003, Vollen co-founded the Life After Exoneration Program, which helps exonerated prisoners find jobs and housing and access counseling and medical care. Vollen has noted that prison is “physically and psychologically abusive.”

Vollen conducted an International Commission of Jurists-sponsored assessment of the Jenin Refugee Camp in the after the Israeli Defense Force's April 2002 incursion.

Along with her human rights activism, Vollen practices medicine once a week and directs the DNA Identification Technology and Human Rights Center at the University of California, Berkeley, where she is a visiting scholar. She is a member of both the Council for Responsible Genetics (CRG) and Voice of Witness boards of directors. Vollen is a co-editor of two of the books in the Voice of Witness series, which gives a voice to those afflicted by contemporary social injustice.

== Publications ==
Surviving Justice: America's Wrongfully Convicted and Exonerated. Voice of Witness series.

- co-edited by Vollen and Dave Eggers

Voices from the Storm: The People of New Orleans on Hurricane Katrina and Its Aftermath. Voice of Witness series.

- co-edited by Vollen and Chris Ying
