= Trinie Dalton =

American Author

Trinie Dalton is an author, editor, and curator based in Los Angeles. She teaches creative writing.

== Biography ==
She received a BA in creative writing and poetry from University of Southern California and an MFA from the Bennington College Writing Seminars.

She has taught at Columbia University, Bard College, Milton Avery Graduate School, Vermont College of Fine Arts, University of Southern California, Dornsife School of Liberal Arts, English Department Art Center College of Design, NYU, Steinhardt Department of Art and Art Professions, and Pratt Institute, Writing for Performance, Publication, and Media Department.

Dalton is the editor of “Mythtym,” a new anthology of essays, fiction and artwork which includes the writing of Dodie Bellamy, Amy Gerstler, and Rachel Kushner among others.

She is known for making handmade publications of her books and including participatory elements of her projects.

== Honors ==
Her book Wide Eyed (Akashic) was a finalist for the Believer Magazine book award.

== Bibliography ==
=== Anthologies ===
- MYTHTYM (Picturebox/Distributed Art Publishers, 2008)
- Dear New Girl Or Whatever Your Name Is (McSweeney's, 2005, co-edited with Lisa Wagner and Eli Horowitz

=== Essays, reviews ===
- "As Good as a Witch." for HOUSEGUEST: FRANCESCA GABBIANI. 2009.
- "Free Your Beast: Reviving the Adult Animal Tale." 2006.
- "The Beginners by Rebecca Wolff." Bookforum. 2011.
- "Girl Zines: Making Media, Doing Feminism." 2010.
- "The Importance of Being Iceland by Eileen Myles." 2009.

=== Books ===
- Wide-Eyed (Akashic Books, 2005)
- A Unicorn is Born (Harry N. Abrams, 2007)
- Sweet Tomb (Madras, 2010)
- Baby Geisha (Two Dollar Radio, 2012)

== Exhibitions ==
- “The Joy of Looking: Contemporary Video Art from LA & NY,” Curated by Dalton for Cinemarfa (May 2012, Marfa)
- “Sync Speaks,” Group exhibition and workshop at Synchronicity Space (July 2011, Los Angeles)
- “Homunculi,” Curated by Dalton for CANADA Gallery (July 2011, New York)
- “History of Photocopy + Copy Art,” Group exhibition and workshop for Las Cienegas Projects (January 2010, Los Angeles)
- “Bruno Munari + Xerography,” Group exhibition and workshop for PIG Sunday School Series, Curated by Gelatin for Deitch Projects (August 2009, New York)
