= Kira Henehan =

American author and novelist

- Born: New York
- Education: Columbia University; San Francisco State University
- Occupations: Novelist, writer
- Writing career
- Genre: Fiction
- Notable works: Orion You Came and You Took All My Marbles

Kira Henehan is an American author and novelist. Her 2010 novel Orion You Came and You Took All My Marbles was nominated for the Believer Book Award.

== Biography ==
Henehan was born in New York. She grew up in the United States, the Caribbean, and Canada. She attended Columbia University and San Francisco State University. She currently lives in New York City.

Henehan's work has been compared to Samuel Beckett and George Saunders. She has been published in literary magazines such as Fence, Conjunctions, and Denver Quarterly. She has won a Pushcart Prize.

== Bibliography ==
- Orion You Came and You Took All My Marbles (2010)
