= Nancy Kress bibliography =

A list of works by or about American science fiction author Nancy Kress.

== Novels ==
- The Prince of Morning Bells (Timescape / Pocket Oct. 1981) / revised: (FoxAcre Press May 2000)
- The Golden Grove (Bluejay Books Mar. 1984)
- The White Pipes (Bluejay Books Jan. 1985)
- An Alien Light (Arbor House / William Morrow Jan. 1988) / (Legend Nov. 1988)
- Brain Rose (William Morrow Jan. 1990)
- Maximum Light (Tor Jan. 1997)
- Yanked! (Avon June 1999) from David Brin's Out of Time series
- Nothing Human (Golden Gryphon Press Sep. 2003)
- Dogs (Tachyon Publications July 2008)
- Steal Across the Sky (Tor Feb. 2009)
- After the Fall, Before the Fall, During the Fall (Tachyon Publications Apr. 2012)
- Flash Point (Viking Nov. 2012)
- Sea Change (Tachyon Publications May 2020)
- The Eleventh Gate (Baen Books May 5, 2020)
- Observer (The Story Plant, January 2023) – with Robert Lanza

The Sleepless

1. Beggars in Spain. AvoNova / William Morrow. April 1993.
2. Beggars and Choosers (Tor Oct. 1994)
3. Beggars Ride (Tor Nov. 1996)
4. "Sleeping Dogs" (nv), Far Horizons: All New Tales from the Greatest Worlds of Science Fiction, ed. Robert Silverberg, Avon Eos May 1999

FBI Agent Robert Cavanaugh

1. Oaths and Miracles (Tor Jan. 1996)
2. Stinger (Tor Oct. 1998)
3. "Plant Engineering" (ss), Death Dines at 8:30, ed. Claudia Bishop & Nick DiChario, Berkley 2001

Probability

The Probability series, also known as Faller's War, is loosely based on Kress' Nebula Award-winning novelette "The Flowers of Aulit Prison", published in the October/November 1996 issue of Asimov's Science Fiction

1. Probability Moon (Tor July 2000)
2. Probability Sun (Tor July 2001)
3. Probability Space (Tor Sep. 2002)

Greentrees

1. Crossfire (Tor Feb. 2003)
2. Crucible (Tor Aug. 2004)

Soulvine Moor Chronicles

Published under the name "Anna Kendall"

1. Crossing Over (Gollancz June 2010 / Viking Oct. 2010)
2. Dark Mist Rising (Gollancz May 2011)
3. A Bright and Terrible Sword (Gollancz Jan. 2013)

Yesterday's Kin Trilogy

1. Tomorrow's Kin (Tor July 2017); a full-length novel which uses the following novella as its opening section:
  - Yesterday's Kin (Tachyon Publications Sep. 2014)
2. If Tomorrow Comes (Tor Mar. 20, 2018)
3. Terran Tomorrow (Tor Nov. 2018)

== Short fiction ==
Collections

- Trinity and Other Stories (Bluejay Books Aug. 1985)
  - Explaining Nancy Kress, Gene Wolfe (in) *
  - "With the Original Cast" (nv), Omni May 1982
  - "Casey's Empire" (ss), F&SF Nov. 1981
  - "Talp Hunt" (ss), Universe 12, ed. Terry Carr, Doubleday 1982
  - "Against a Crooked Stile" (nv), Asimov's May 1979
  - "Explanations, Inc." (ss), F&SF July 1984; read online
  - "Shadows on the Cave Wall" (nv), Universe 11, ed. Terry Carr, Doubleday 1981
  - "Ten Thousand Pictures, One Word" (ss), Twilight Zone July/Aug. 1984
  - "Night Win" (nv), Asimov's Sep. 1983
  - "Borovsky's Hollow Woman" (with Jeff Duntemann) (nv), Omni Oct. 1983
  - "Out of All Them Bright Stars" (ss), F&SF Mar. 1985
  - "Trinity" (na), Asimov's Oct. 1984
- The Aliens of Earth (Arkham House Oct. 1993)
  - "The Price of Oranges" (nv), Asimov's Apr. 1989
  - "Glass" (ss), Asimov's Sept. 1987
  - "People Like Us" (ss), Asimov's Sept. 1989; read online
  - "Cannibals" (nv), Asimov's May 1987
  - "To Scale" (ss), Xanadu, ed. Jane Yolen & Martin Harry Greenberg, Tor 1993
  - "Touchdown" (ss), Asimov's Oct. 1990
  - "Down Behind Cuba Lake" (ss), Asimov's Sept. 1986
  - "In a World Like This" (ss), Omni Oct. 1988
  - "Philippa's Hands" (ss), Full Spectrum, ed. Lou Aronica & Shawna McCarthy, Bantam 1988
  - "Inertia" (nv), Analog Jan. 1990
  - "Phone Repairs" (ss), Asimov's Dec. 1986
  - "The Battle of Long Island" (ss), Omni Feb./Mar. 1993
  - "Renaissance" (ss), Asimov's mid-Dec. 1989
  - "Spillage" (ss), F&SF Apr. 1988; read online
  - "The Mountain to Mohammed" (ss), Asimov's Apr. 1992
  - "Craps" (ss), Asimov's Mar. 1988
  - "And Wild For to Hold" (na), Asimov's July 1991
  - "In Memoriam" (ss), Asimov's June 1988
- Beaker's Dozen (Tor Aug. 1998)
  - Introduction (in) *
  - "Beggars in Spain" (na), Axolotl Press/Pulphouse Feb. 1991 / Asimov's Apr. 1991
  - "Feigenbaum Number" (ss), Omni Winter 1995 [not seen until 1996]
  - "Margin of Error" (ss), Omni Oct. 1994; read online
  - "Fault Lines" (na), Asimov's Aug. 1995
  - "Unto The Daughters" (ss), Sisters in Fantasy, ed. Susan Shwartz & Martin H. Greenberg, Roc 1995
  - "Evolution" (nv), Asimov's Oct. 1995
  - "Ars Longa" (ss), By Any Other Fame, ed. Mike Resnick & Martin Harry Greenberg, DAW 1993
  - "Sex Education" (nv), Intersections, ed. John Kessel, Mark L. Van Name & Richard Butner, Tor 1996
  - "Grant Us This Day" (ss), Asimov's Sept. 1993; slightly revised here
  - "The Flowers of Aulit Prison" (nv), Asimov's Oct./Nov. 1996
  - "Summer Wind" (ss), Ruby Slippers, Golden Tears, ed. Ellen Datlow & Terri Windling, AvoNova/William Morrow 1995
  - "Always True to Thee, in My Fashion" (ss), Asimov's Jan. 1997; read online
  - "Dancing on Air" (na), Asimov's July 1993
- Nano Comes to Clifford Falls and Other Stories (Golden Gryphon Press May 2008)
  - Foreword, Mike Resnick (in) *
  - "Nano Comes to Clifford Falls" (ss), Asimov's July 2006
  - "Patent Infringement" (ss), Asimov's May 2002
  - "Computer Virus" (nv), Asimov's Apr. 2001
  - "Product Development" (vi), Nature Mar. 16, 2006; read online
  - "The Most Famous Little Girl in the World" (nv), SciFiction May 8, 2002; read online
  - "Savior" (na), Asimov's June 2000
  - "Ej-Es" (nv), Stars: Original Stories Based on the Songs of Janis Ian, ed. Janis Ian & Mike Resnick, DAW 2003; read online
  - "Shiva in Shadow" (na), Between Worlds, ed. Robert Silverberg, SFBC 2004
  - "First Flight" (ss), Space Cadets, ed. Mike Resnick, L.A.WorldCon/SciFi, Inc., Aug. 2006
  - "To Cuddle Amy" (vi), Asimov's Aug. 2000
  - "Wetlands Preserve" (nv), SciFiction Sep. 27 2000
  - "Mirror Image" (na), One Million A.D., ed. Gardner Dozois, SFBC Dec. 2005
  - "My Mother, Dancing" (ss), Asimov's June 2004; first appeared in French in Destination 3001, ed. Robert Silverberg & Jacques Chambon, Flammarion 2000
- Five Stories (self-published ebook July 2011)
  - "The Flowers of Aulit Prison" (nv), Asimov's Oct./Nov. 1996
  - "Exegesis" (ss), Asimov's Apr./May 2009
  - "Margin of Error" (ss), Omni Oct. 1994; read online
  - "Patent Infringement" (ss), Asimov's May 2002
  - "To Cuddle Amy" (vi), Asimov's Aug. 2000
- Future Perfect: Six Stories of Genetic Engineering (Phoenix Pick Feb. 2012)
  - "The Flowers of Aulit Prison" (nv), Asimov's Oct./Nov. 1996
  - "First Rites" (na), Jim Baen's Universe Oct. 2008
  - "Trinity" (na), Asimov's Oct. 1984
  - "Margin of Error" (ss), Omni Oct. 1994; read online
  - "Dancing on Air" (na), Asimov's July 1993
  - "And No Such Things Grow Here" (nv), Asimov's June 2001
- The Body Human: Three Stories of Future Medicine (Phoenix Pick Mar. 2012)
  - "Evolution" (nv), Asimov's Oct. 1995
  - "Fault Lines" (na), Asimov's Aug. 1995
  - "The Mountain to Mohammed" (ss), Asimov's Apr. 1992
- AI Unbound: Two Stories of Artificial Intelligence (Phoenix Pick Mar. 2012)
  - "Computer Virus" (nv), Asimov's Apr. 2001
  - "Savior" (na), Asimov's June 2000
- Fountain of Age: Stories (Small Beer Press Apr. 2012)
  - "The Erdmann Nexus" (na), Asimov's Oct./Nov. 2008
  - "The Kindness of Strangers" (ss), Fast Forward 2, ed. Lou Anders, Pyr Oct. 2008
  - "By Fools Like Me" (ss), Asimov's Sep. 2007
  - "First Rites" (na), Jim Baen's Universe Oct. 2008
  - "End Game" (ss), Asimov's Apr./May 2007; read online
  - "Images of Anna" (ss), Fantasy Sep. 2009; read online
  - "Laws of Survival" (nv), Jim Baen's Universe Dec. 2007; read online
  - "Safeguard" (nv), Asimov's Jan. 2007
  - "Fountain of Age" (na), Asimov's July 2007
- The best of Nancy Kress. Subterranean Press. 2015.
  - Introduction (in) * {Kress explains here that she chose the stories herself, and that the award-winning novellas "The Erdmann Nexus" and "Fountain of Age", among others, were not included for reasons of length}
  - "And Wild For to Hold" (na), Asimov's July 1991
  - "Out of All Them Bright Stars" (ss), F&SF Mar. 1985
  - "Pathways" (nv), Twelve Tomorrows [2013 Edition], ed. Stephen Cass, MIT Technology Review Oct. 2013; read online
  - "Dancing on Air" (na), Asimov's July 1993
  - "Unto The Daughters" (ss), Sisters in Fantasy, ed. Susan Shwartz & Martin H. Greenberg, Roc June 1995
  - "Laws of Survival" (nv), Jim Baen's Universe Dec. 2007; read online
  - "Someone to Watch over Me" (ss), IEEE Spectrum June 2014; read online
  - "The Flowers of Aulit Prison" (nv), Asimov's Oct./Nov. 1996
  - "The Price of Oranges" (nv), Asimov's Apr. 1989
  - "By Fools Like Me" (ss), Asimov's Sep. 2007
  - "Casey's Empire" (ss), F&SF Nov. 1981
  - "Shiva in Shadow" (na), Between Worlds, ed. Robert Silverberg, SFBC 2004
  - "Grant Us This Day" (ss), Asimov's Sept. 1993; slightly revised here
  - "The Kindness of Strangers" (ss), Fast Forward 2, ed. Lou Anders, Pyr Oct. 2008
  - "End Game" (ss), Asimov's Apr./May 2007; read online
  - "My Mother, Dancing" (ss), Asimov's June 2004; first appeared in French in Destination 3001, ed. Robert Silverberg & Jacques Chambon, Flammarion 2000
  - "Trinity" (na), Asimov's Oct. 1984
  - "People Like Us" (ss), Asimov's Sept. 1989; read online
  - "Evolution" (nv), Asimov's Oct. 1995
  - "Margin of Error" (ss), Omni Oct. 1994; read online
  - "Beggars in Spain" (na), Axolotl Press/Pulphouse Feb. 1991 / Asimov's Apr. 1991

Chapbooks

- Beggars in Spain, (Axolotl Press / Pulphouse Feb. 1991) / Asimov's Apr. 1991
- The Price of Oranges, (Pulphouse June 1992); (ss), reprinted from Asimov's Apr. 1989
- Dancing on Air, (Tachyon Publications Sep. 1997); (na), reprinted from Asimov's July 1993
- Act One, (Phoenix Pick Mar. 2010); (na), reprinted from Asimov's Mar. 2009

Stories

Title	Year	First published	Reprinted/collected	Notes
Beggars in Spain	1991	Beggars in Spain. Axolotl Press / Pulphouse Publishing. Feb 1991.	"Beggars in Spain". Isaac Asimov's Science Fiction Magazine. 15 (4–5). Apr 1991.	Novella
Eoghan	1992	Alternate Kennedys edited by Mike Resnick, Tor Books, July 1992		
Mithridates, he died old	2013	"Mithridates, he died old". Asimov's Science Fiction. 37 (1): 50–56. January 2013.		
Frog watch	2013	"Frog watch". Asimov's Science Fiction. 37 (12): 82–88. Dec 2013.		
The common good	2014	"The common good". Asimov's Science Fiction. 38 (1): 72–100. Jan 2014.		Novelette
Sidewalk at 12:10 P.M.	2014	"Sidewalk at 12:10 P.M.". Asimov's Science Fiction. 38 (6): 74–78. June 2014.		
Writer's block	2014	"Writer's block". Asimov's Science Fiction. 38 (8): 34–47. August 2014.		Novelette

== Anthologies ==
- Nebula Awards Showcase 2003 (Roc / Penguin Apr. 2003)

== Non-fiction ==
- Beginnings, Middles & Ends (Writer's Digest Books 1993)
- Dynamic Characters: How to Create Personalities That Keep Readers Captivated (Writer's Digest Books 1998)
- Characters, Emotion & Viewpoint: Techniques and Exercises for Crafting Dynamic Characters and Effective Viewpoints (Writer's Digest Books 2005)

== Critical studies and reviews of Kress' work ==
Yesterday's kin

- Heck, Peter (February 2015). "On Books". Asimov's Science Fiction. 39 (2): 107–111.
