= Sharifi =

Sharifi (Persian: شریفی) is a common Muslim surname most common among Iranians and Afghans. Among Arabs, the name takes the form al-Sharifi (Arabic: الشریفی), which is a common surname in Iraq.

Al-Sharifi is a well-known surname in the holy city of Najaf. It usually means the "honorables". Loosely translated, it means "of high-class" or "wealthy".

In the city of Hamadan in Iran, Sharifi is a very old and big family with many sub-families such as Sharifi-Amina, Sharifi-Minoo, Sharifi-Gharib, Sharifi-Syed, Sharifi-Shah, Sharifi-Javidi, and Sharifi-Monzavi. There are other big families in this city like Mansour and Izadi. Mahmoud Sharifi Amina is a poet whose contributions to the folklore poetry of Hamedan is notable.

In fiction, it is the name of major characters Jennifer Sharifi and Miranda Sharifi in Nancy Kress's Sleepless series (Beggars in Spain, Beggars and Choosers, and Beggars Ride).

== Notable people ==
- Amredin Sharifi (born 1992), Afghan footballer
- Habib Sharifi (born 1950s), Iranian footballer
- Jamshied Sharifi (born 1960), American composer and musician
- Mehdi Sharifi (born 1992), Iranian footballer
- Mohammad Sharifi (born 1978), Saudi Arabian footballer
- Mohammad Sharifi (Iranian footballer) (born 2000), Iranian footballer
- Naim Sharifi (born 1992), Russian footballer of Tajik origin
- Nasser Sharifi (born 1921), Iranian former sports shooter
- Rashid Sharifi (born 1984), Iranian weightlifter
- Sohaila Sharifi, Afghan politician
- Suleiman Sharifi (born 1958), Tajikistani artist

== Places ==
- Tolombeh-ye Rahmat Allah Sharifi, village in Kerman Province, Iran
