= Yao Haijun =

Chinese science fiction editor

Yao Haijun (Chinese: 姚海军) is the editor-in-chief of Science Fiction World (科幻世界, SFW), the most successful Chinese science fiction magazine. Yao has been an editor at SFW since 1998 and became editor-in-chief in 2005. He has also served as the chief editor of 《世界科幻大师丛书》 ("World Science Fiction Masters Collection"), a sci-fi book series.

October 2024, he was arrested for corruption.

== Early life ==
Yao was born in a farm in Yichun in Heilongjiang Province. A sci-fi book borrowed from a maths teacher aroused his initial interest in sci-fi fiction. He raised money to launch a sci-fi magazine called "nebulae" (星云). The magazine serves as a fan magazine, which published book reviews and sci-fi news. The magazine put up a bridge of communication among publishers, writers and readers.

== Career at SFW ==
Yao was invited to work as an editor of SFW by Yang Xiao (杨潇), who was then the editor-in-chief of SFW. Yao worked as an editor from June 1998 to June 2002, an assistant chief editor from June 2002 to March 2003, associate editor from March 2003 to October 2005, and editor-in-chief from October 2005 to the present. October 2024, he was arrested for corruption.

== World Science Fiction Masters Collection ==
Although the SFW has a circulation of 200,000 copies per issue, it is difficult to publish sci-fi books in China. When the delivery department worried that they will incur economic deficits, Yao persuaded them otherwise. The World Science Fiction Masters Collection proved to be a great success.

== Books series published ==
Yao works as the chief editor of several book series: "Cornerstone of Chinese Science Fiction", "Popular Science Fiction of the World", "Work of World Fantasy Masters", and "World Science Fiction Masters Collection" (世界科幻大师丛书). The Three Body Problem, written by Liu Cixin is one of a set of "Cornerstone of Chinese Science Fiction". The circulation of The Three Body Problem is more than seven hundred thousand.

The following works are in the collection "World Science Fiction Masters Collection":

Name	Translated Name	Date
Nightfall	日暮	2003
The Door into Summer	进入盛夏之门	2003
Ender's Game	安德的游戏	2003
Speaker for the Dead	死者代言人	2003
Solaris & K-Pax	索拉利斯星·K星异客	2003
Calculating God	计算中的上帝	2003
Starship Troopers	星船伞兵	2003
The Demolished Man	被毁灭的人	2004
A Fire Upon The Deep	深渊上的火	2004
Ender’s Shadow	安德的影子	2004
Xenocide	外星屠异	2004
The Collected Short Fiction of Robert Sheckley	浪漫服务公司	2004
Darwin's radio	达尔文电波	2004
Кладбище джиннов	妖魔古墓	2004
Golden Fleece	金羊毛	2004
Starplex	星丛	2004
The Moon Is a Harsh Mistress	严厉的月亮	2004
The Puppet Masters	傀儡主人	2004
Story of Your Life	你一生的故事	2004
The Warrior's Apprentice	战争学徒	2004
Mirror Dance	镜舞	2004
Memory	记忆	2004
A Deepness in the Sky	天渊	2005
The Moon Children	月亮孩子	2005
Citizen of the Galaxy	银河系公民	2005
The Ultimate Hitchhiker's Guide to the Galaxy	银河系漫游指南	2005
The Restaurant at the End of the Universe	宇宙尽头的餐馆	2005
Double Star	双星	2005
The Forever War	千年战争	2005
Way Station	星际驿站	2005
日本沈没	日本沉没	2005
Dune	沙丘	2006
Children of Dune	沙丘之子	2006
Dune Messiah	沙丘救世主	2006
The Day Of The Triffids	三尖树时代	2006
Thorns	荆棘	2006
Childhood's End	童年的终结	2006
Mission of Gravity	重力使命	2006
パラサイト・イヴ	寄生前夜	2006
Diplomatic Immunity	外交豁免权	2006
Komarr	科玛	2006
Cetaganda	西塔甘达	2006
The Green Hills of Earth	地球上的绿色山丘	2006
Between Planets	星际归途	2006
Stranger in a Strange Land	异乡异客	2006
Bones of The Earth	地球龙骨	2006
Where Late the Sweet Birds Sang	迟暮鸟语	2007
Forever Peace	永远的和平	2007
Beggars in Spain	西班牙乞丐	2007
Beggars and Choosers	乞丐与选民	2007
Beggars Ride	乞丐的愿望	2007
Time Enough for Love	时间足够你爱	2007
The Uplift War	提升之战	2008
Brothers in Arms	兄弟手足	2008
Barrayar	贝拉亚	2008
A Civil Campaign	明争暗斗	2008
Lord of Light	光明王	2008
The Martian Chronicles	火星编年史	2008
Hominids	原始人类	2008
異星の人	异星人	2008
So Long, and Thanks for All the Fish	拜拜，多谢你们的鱼	2008
Mostly Harmless	基本上无害	2008
Life, the Universe and Everything	生命、宇宙以及一切	2008
Stations of The Tide	潮汐站	2008
The Peace War	彩虹尽头	2009
Hominids	为和平而战	2009
Marooned in Realtime	实时放逐	2009
The Collected Stories of Vernor Vinge	弗诺·文奇科幻小说集	2009
Cities in Flight	飞城	2009
Ring World	环形世界	2009
This Immortal	不朽	2009
A Case of Conscience	事关良心	2009
Snow Crash	雪崩	2009
The Left Hand of Darkness	黑暗的左手	2009
The Dispossessed	一无所有	2009
The Man Who Sold the Moon and Orphans of the Sky	出卖月亮的人	2009
Methuselah's Children	玛士撒拉之子	2009
The Rolling Stones	斯通一家闯太空	2010
プリズム	棱镜	2010
神狩り	神狩りhttp://book.douban.com/subject/4067694/	2010
太陽の簒奪者	太阳篡夺者	2010
廃園の天使シリーズ	废园天使	2010
Dying of the Light	光逝	2010
The Windup Girl	发条女孩	2012
The Algorithms for Love	爱的算法	2012
For a Breath I Tarry	趁生命气息逗留	2010
Tuf Voyaging	图夫航行记	2010
Blind Sight	盲视	2013
The Doors of His Face, the Lamps of His Mouth	脸上的门，口中的灯	2010
