= Observer (novel) =

2023 science fiction novel by Robert Lanza and Nancy Kress

- First edition cover
- Author: Robert Lanza and Nancy Kress
- Language: English
- Subject: Biocentrism
- Genres: Science fiction
- Publisher: The Story Plant
- Publication date: January 2023
- Publication place: United States
- Media type: Hardcover
- Pages: 368
- ISBN: 978-1-61188-343-5

Observer is a 2023 science fiction novel by American medical doctor and scientist, Robert Lanza, and science fiction author, Nancy Kress. It is Lanza's first novel and Kress's first novel written in collaboration with another author.

Observer is based on the concept of biocentrism, a theory proposed by Lanza in 2007, which states that the universe only comes into existence when there is consciousness to observe it.

== Plot summary ==
Caroline (Caro) Soames-Watkins is a neurosurgeon who resigns her position at a Florida hospital after her accusation of sexual misconduct against a superior is dismissed and she becomes the target of a social media smear campaign. She is contacted by her great-uncle, Samuel Watkins, a Nobel Prize-winning scientist, who offers her a job as a surgeon at a secret medical research facility in the Cayman Islands. There she meets George Weigert, a physicist, and Julian Dey, a technology developer. She learns that using George's theories, they have developed technology that will prove Sam's assertion that reality is created by the observer. Her job is to implant computer chips into the brains of volunteers.

George explains to Caro that just as quantum mechanics shows that reality at a microscopic level is changed by the observer, the same happens at the macroscopic level, that is the universe is shaped by consciousness. Julian tells her that they developed computer chips, that when implanted into the brains of volunteers, the subjects are able to observe and enter branches of the multiverse. Caro has trouble accepting some of George's theories, and she is not convinced that the brain implantees are entering branches of the multiverse, but are simply hallucinating. Nonetheless, Caro is intrigued by the project and agrees to participate.

== Background ==
Lanza proposed his concept of biocentrism in a 2007 article, "A New Theory of the Universe", published in The American Scholar. Between 2009 and 2020, in collaboration with astronomer Bob Berman and theoretical physicist Matej Pavšič, Lanza published three non-fiction books on biocentrism. For Observer, Lanza's agent suggested a collaboration with Kress, a science fiction author of over twenty novels, and winner of several awards.

In an interview in Publishers Weekly, Lanza said that he had often pondered "existential questions" about the nature of reality, which led him to conclude that "reality is a process that involves our consciousness." When Kress heard that Lanza wanted to express his ideas of biocentrism in a novel, she was "intrigued", because she too had "always thought that consciousness is woven into the universe". Lanza said he wanted "to bring [biocentrism] to life" in a story and explain that "space, time, and the nature of life and death itself depends on the observer in us." Lanza added that "[o]n the surface, these ideas are really crazy", which was why he involved Kress to help him convey his ideas without coming across as a "nut job". Kress said the trick was to include enough science to demonstrate that the story "rests on a solid scientific foundation", but not too much that would overwhelm the reader. She added that story's ideas are "complicated", and it took several rewrites to get the balance between science and fiction just right.

Lanza said in an interview with GeekWire, "The observer is actually the basis of the universe, so ... the novel and the scientific ideas are really a rethink of everything we know about time, space and indeed the universe itself". Kress added, "The novel is about how we understand reality, and nothing could be more important about that, because everything else is based on it". Kress remarked that while Observer "takes some far-out turns", it follows the science more closely than many science fiction films. Lanza expressed his hope that in time, the novel will be seen as "less fictional and more scientific."

== Critical reception ==
In a starred review, Kirkus Reviews described Observer as a "thought-provoking fictional examination of big ideas" that includes consciousness, quantum physics and multiverse theory. The review stated that the book "strikes a fine balance between" hard science fiction and characterization. It said the two narrators, Caro and George, are "well developed and accessible", while Caro, sceptical of some of George's theories, "acts as a surrogate for lay readers". The review concluded that Observer is "full of life-affirming ideas that’s likely to make readers rethink concepts of time and space."

In another starred review, Publishers Weekly called Observer a "brilliant Crichtonesque thriller". It said it centers around Lanza's theory of biocentrism and examines what the implications of proving it would be. The review stated that the book is "perfect for fans of Blake Crouch".

Speculative fiction author Lisa Tuttle wrote in The Guardian that in Observer Lanza introduces his theory of biocentrism to a broader audience. She said that while she found the experiments in the novel "do not convince as proof of anything except that it is possible to change people’s minds", it is nonetheless "a compelling story filled with believable characters and interesting ideas."
