= Kwang-su (name) =

- Hangul: 광수
- RR: Gwangsu
- MR: Kwangsu

Kwang-su, also spelled Kwang-soo or Gwang-su, is a Korean given name.

According to South Korean government data, Kwang-su was the ninth-most popular name for newborn boys in 1945.

== People ==
People with this name include:

=== Film and music ===
- Park Kwang-su (born 1955), South Korean film director
- Kim Jho Kwang-soo (born 1965), also known as Peter Kim, South Korean film director
- Lee Kwang-soo (born 1985), South Korean actor

=== Sportspeople ===
- Kim Kwang-soo (volleyball), South Korean volleyball player, represented South Korea at the 1964 Summer Olympics
- Jeong Gwang-su (born 1968), South Korean rower
- Oh Kwang-soo (born 1965), South Korean boxer
- Back Kwang-soo (born 1978), South Korean rugby union footballer
- Cha Kwang-su (born 1979), North Korean Greco-Roman wrestler

=== Writers ===
- Sin Kwangsu (1712–1775), late Joseon Dynasty poet
- Yi Gwangsu (1892–1950), Korean writer and independence activist
- Ma Kwang-soo (1951–2017) South Korean educator and novelist

=== Other ===
- Sin Gwang-su (spy) (born 1929), North Korean operative involved in abductions of Japanese citizens
- Kim Kwang-soo (born 1954), South Korean biologist
- Kwang Soo Kim (born 1960), South Korean chemist

== See also ==
- List of Korean given names
