= Biocentrism =

Biocentrism or biocentric may refer to:

- Biocentrism (ethics), an ethical point of view that extends inherent value to all living things
- Biocentric universe, a concept proposed by Robert Lanza that places biology above the other sciences
