= Robert Lanza =

American medical doctor and scientist

Robert P. Lanza
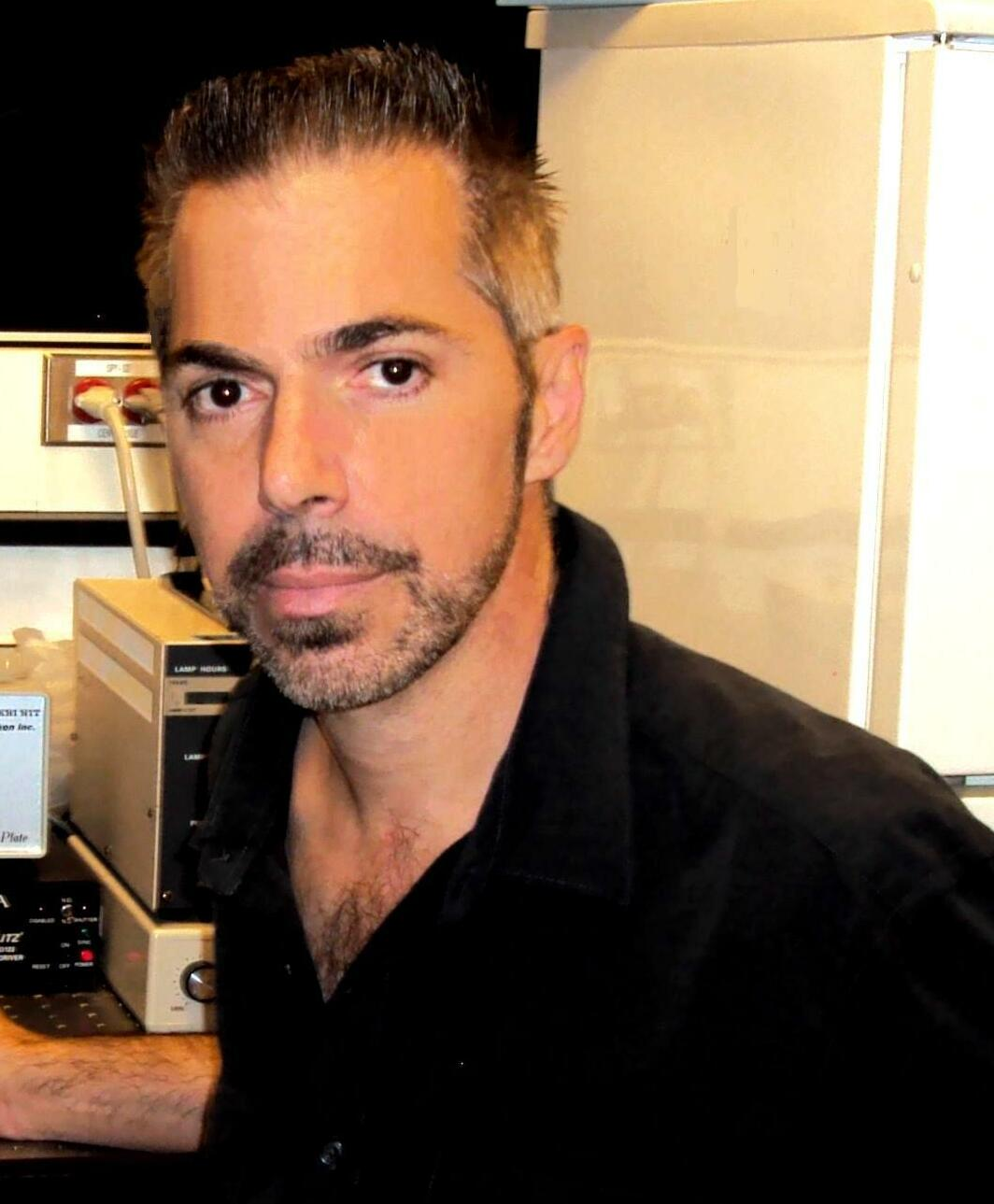
- Lanza in 2009
- Born: Robert Lanza; 11 February 1956 (age 70); Boston, Massachusetts, U.S.
- Education: University of Pennsylvania
- Known for: Stem cell biology, cloning, tissue engineering, biocentric universe
- Scientific career
- Workplaces: Astellas Institute for Regenerative Medicine, Wake Forest University School of Medicine

Robert Lanza (born 11 February 1956 in Boston, Massachusetts) is an American medical doctor and scientist, currently Head of Astellas Global Regenerative Medicine, and Chief Scientific Officer of the Astellas Institute for Regenerative Medicine. He is an Adjunct Professor at Wake Forest University School of Medicine.

== Early life and education ==
Lanza was born in Boston, Massachusetts, and grew up south of there, in Stoughton, Massachusetts. Lanza "altered the genetics of chickens in his basement", and came to the attention of Harvard Medical School researchers when he appeared at the university with his results. Jonas Salk, B. F. Skinner, and Christiaan Barnard mentored Lanza over the next ten years. Lanza attended the University of Pennsylvania, receiving BA and MD degrees. There, he was a Benjamin Franklin Scholar and a University Scholar. Lanza was also a Fulbright Scholar. He currently resides in Clinton, Massachusetts.

== Career ==
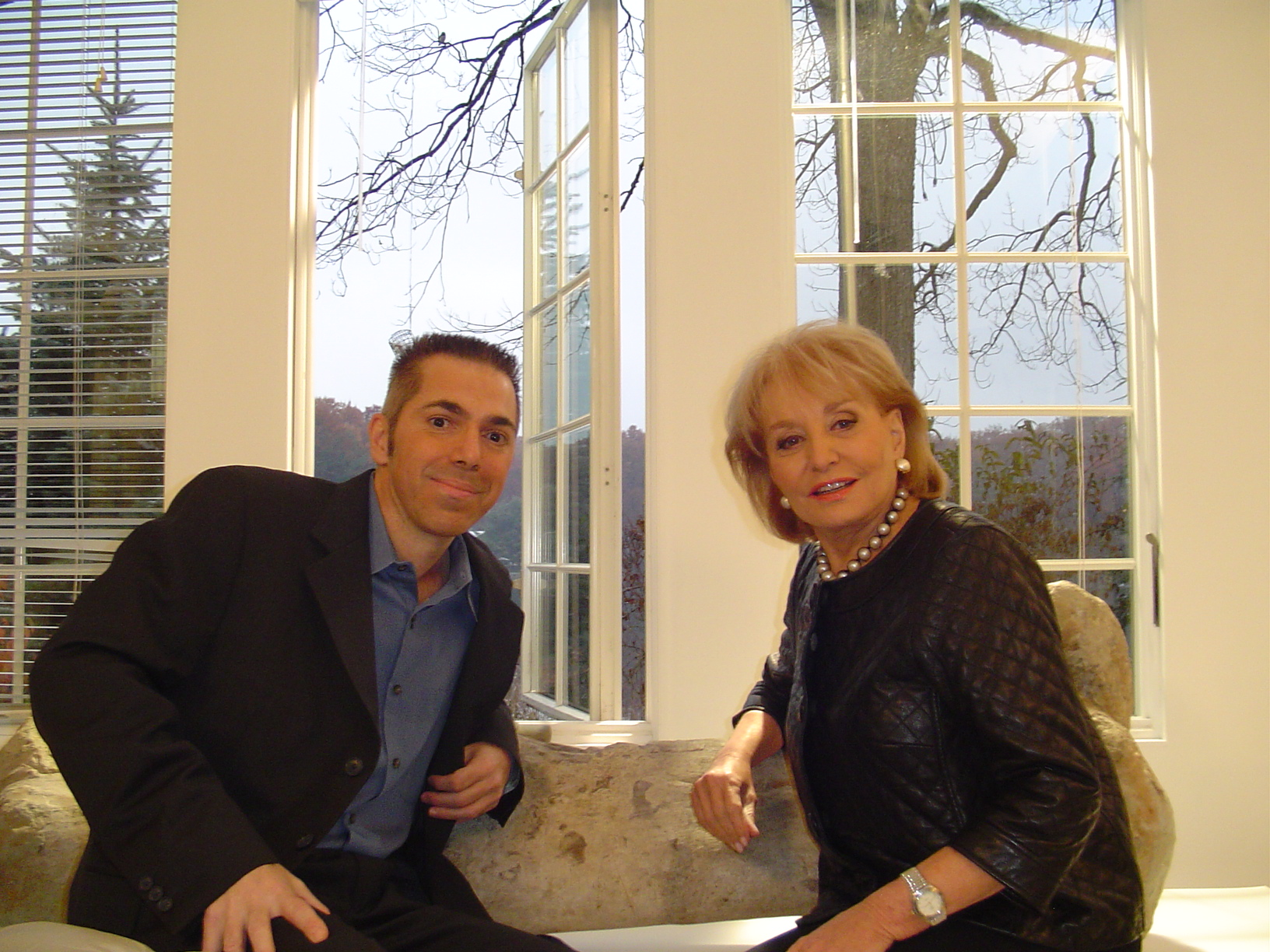
Lanza being interviewed by Barbara Walters in 2007

=== Stem cell research ===
Lanza was part of the team that cloned the world's first early stage human embryos, as well as the first to successfully generate stem cells from adults using somatic-cell nuclear transfer (therapeutic cloning).

Lanza demonstrated that techniques used in preimplantation genetic diagnosis could be used to generate embryonic stem cells without embryonic destruction.

In 2001, he was also the first to clone an endangered species (a Gaur), and in 2003, he cloned an endangered wild ox (a Banteng) from the frozen skin cells of an animal that had died at the San Diego Zoo nearly a quarter-of-a-century earlier.

Lanza and his colleagues were the first to demonstrate that nuclear transplantation could be used to extend the lifespan of certain cells and to generate immune-compatible tissues, including the first organ grown in the laboratory from cloned cells.

Lanza showed that it is feasible to generate functional oxygen-carrying red blood cells from human embryonic stem cells under conditions suitable for clinical scale-up. The blood cells could potentially serve as a source of "universal" blood.

His team discovered how to generate functional hemangioblasts (a population of "ambulance" cells) from human embryonic stem cells. In animals, these cells quickly repaired vascular damage, cutting the death rate after a heart attack in half and restoring the blood flow to ischemic limbs that might otherwise have required amputation.

In 2012 Lanza and a team led by Kwang-Soo Kim at Harvard University reported a method for generating induced pluripotent stem (iPS) cells by incubating them with proteins, instead of genetically manipulating the cells to make more of those proteins.

=== Clinical trials for blindness ===
Lanza's team at Advanced Cell Technology were able to generate retinal pigmented epithelium cells from stem cells, and subsequent studies found that these cells could restore vision in animal models of macular degeneration. With this technology, some forms of blindness could potentially be treatable.

In 2010, ACT received approval from the Food and Drug Administration for clinical trials of a pluripotent stem cell-based treatment for use in people with degenerative eye diseases. In 2011 ACT received approval from the Medicines and Healthcare products Regulatory Agency to use its PSC-based cell therapy in the UK; this was the first approval to study a PSC-based treatment in Europe. The first person received the embryonic stem cell treatment in the UK in 2012.

The results of the first two clinical trials were published in the Lancet in 2012, with a follow-up paper in 2014, which provided the first published reports of the long-term safety and possible biologic activity of pluripotent stem cell progeny into humans.

=== Science policy activism ===
In 2001, Lanza initiated a letter to US president George W. Bush, urging him to not block the first flow of federal dollars for research on human embryo cells. The letter was signed by 80 Nobel laureates from various areas of science and send to the White House by FAX, three weeks before a deadline to apply for NIH stem cell research grants. This was in view of the intention by the Health and Human Services Secretary to revise the decision of the Clinton administration to generously fund stem cell research.

=== Biocentrism ===
In 2007 Lanza's article "A New Theory of the Universe" appeared in The American Scholar. The essay proposed Lanza's idea of a biocentric universe, which places biology above the other sciences. Lanza's book Biocentrism: How Life and Consciousness are the Keys to Understanding the Universe followed in 2009, co-written with Bob Berman.

Lanza's biocentric hypothesis met with a mixed reception. Nobel laureate in medicine E. Donnall Thomas stated that "Any short statement does not do justice to such a scholarly work. The work is a scholarly consideration of science and philosophy that brings biology into the central role in unifying the whole." Former Arizona State University physicist and antitheist activist Lawrence Krauss stated: "There are no scientific breakthroughs about anything, as far as I can see. It may represent interesting philosophy, but it doesn't look, at first glance, as if it will change anything about science." In USA Today Online, astrophysicist and science writer David Lindley asserted that Lanza's concept was a "...vague, inarticulate metaphor..." and stated that "...I certainly don't see how thinking his way would lead you into any new sort of scientific or philosophical insight. That's all very nice, I would say to Lanza, but now what?" Daniel Dennett, a Tufts University philosopher and eliminative materialist, said he did not think the concept meets the standard of a philosophical theory. "It looks like an opposite of a theory, because he doesn't explain how [consciousness] happens at all. He's stopping where the fun begins."

Lanza subsequently published several books that further developed his concept of biocentrism including a 2016 book, Beyond Biocentrism: Rethinking Time, Space, Consciousness, and the Illusion of Death, and a third, The Grand Biocentric Design: How Life Creates Reality, written with Bob Berman and theoretical physicist Matej Pavšič, and published in 2020.

In January 2023, Lanza published a novel exploring biocentrism, Observer with science fiction author Nancy Kress. Lanza said in an interview that he wanted "to bring [biocentrism] to life" in a story that would explain that "space, time, and the nature of life and death itself depends on the observer in us."

== Bibliography ==
Non-fiction

- Biocentrism, How Life and Consciousness are the Keys to Understanding the True Nature of the Universe (2009) – with Bob Berman
- Beyond Biocentrism, Rethinking Time, Space, Consciousness, and the Illusion of Death (2016) – with Bob Berman
- The Grand Biocentric Design, How Life Creates Reality (2020) – with Matej Pavšič and Bob Berman

Novels

- Observer (The Story Plant, 2023) – with Nancy Kress

== Awards and public commentary ==
Lanza has received numerous awards and other recognition, including:

- 2006: named "Mass High Tech All Star" at the 11th annual award reception
- 2010: BioWorld (publication) hailed Lanza as a "stem cell pioneer" and recognized him as one of twenty-eight "movers and shakers" who would shape biotechnology over the next twenty years
- 2010: for research in "translating basic science discoveries into new and better treatments"; won a National Institutes of Health (NIH) Director's Opportunity Award
- 2013: nominated to receive the Italian Heritage and Culture Committee of the Bronx and Westchester "Il Leone di San Marco Award in Medicine"
- 2014: included in the Time magazine Time 100 list of the "100 Most Influential People in the World"
- 2015: included in the Prospect magazine list of the "Top 50 World Thinkers"
