= Chemtrail conspiracy theory =

Conspiracy theory about contrails

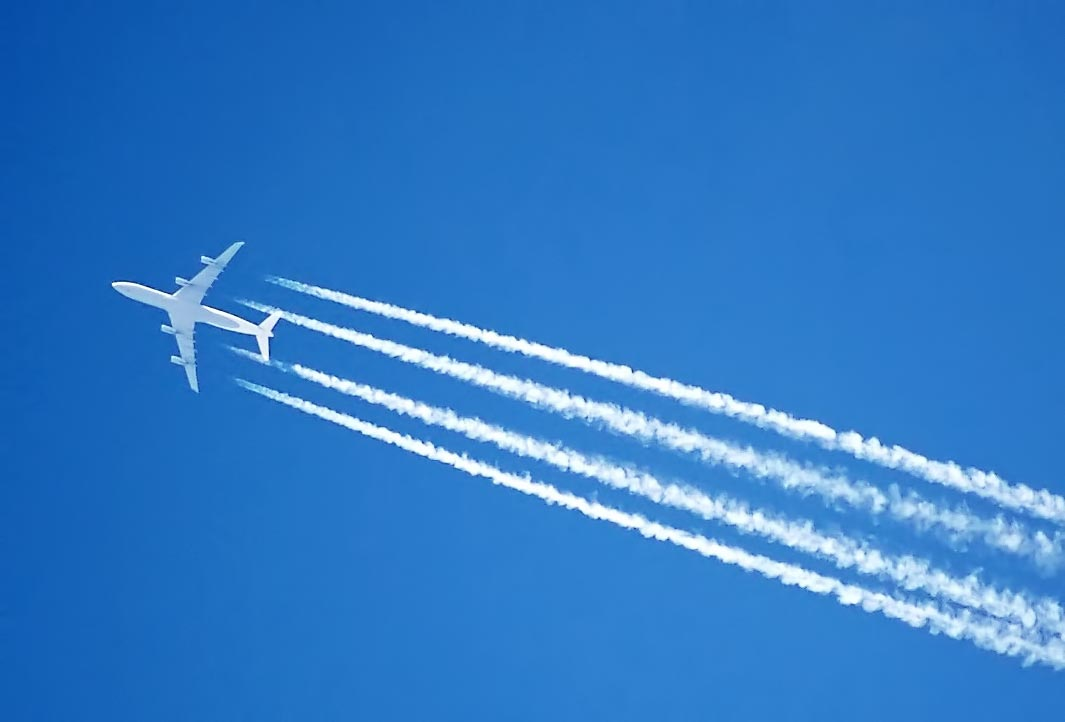
An Airbus A340's engines leaving a water condensation trail (contrail) – miniature clouds formed by the engine exhaust

The chemtrail conspiracy theory /ˈkɛmtreɪl/ is the erroneous belief that long-lasting condensation trails left in the sky by high-flying aircraft are actually "chemtrails" consisting of chemical or biological agents, sprayed for nefarious purposes undisclosed to the general public. Believers in this conspiracy theory say that while normal contrails dissipate relatively quickly, contrails that linger must contain additional substances. Those who subscribe to the theory speculate that the purpose of the chemical release may be solar radiation management, weather modification, psychological manipulation, human population control, biological or chemical warfare, or testing of biological or chemical agents on a population, and that the trails are causing respiratory illnesses and other health problems.

Chemtrail conspiracy theories emerged in the late 1990s after publication of a 1996 United States Air Force (USAF) report on weather modification, with the Air Force accused of secretly spraying substances via aircraft. The theories spread through internet forums and were popularised by radio host Art Bell from 1999.

Chemtrails have been dismissed by the scientific community. There is no evidence that purported chemtrails differ from normal water-based contrails routinely left by high-flying aircraft under certain atmospheric conditions. Proponents have tried to prove that chemical spraying occurs, but their analyses have been flawed or based on misconceptions. Because of the conspiracy theory's persistence and questions about government involvement, scientists and government agencies around the world have repeatedly explained that the supposed chemtrails are in fact normal contrails.

== History ==
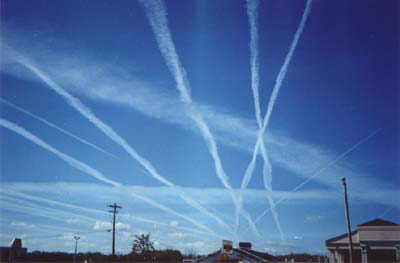
Multiple concurrent contrails. How long they last depends upon the weather, especially the temperature, humidity, and wind speed.

Chemtrail conspiracy theories began to circulate after the United States Air Force (USAF) published a 1996 report about weather modification. In the late 1990s, the USAF was accused of "spraying the U.S. population with mysterious substances" from aircraft "generating unusual contrail patterns". The theories were posted on internet forums by people including Richard Finke and William Thomas and were among many conspiracy theories popularized by late-night radio host Art Bell, starting in 1999. As the chemtrail conspiracy theory spread, federal officials were flooded with angry calls and letters.

A multi-agency response attempting to dispel the rumors was published in 2000 by the Environmental Protection Agency (EPA), the Federal Aviation Administration (FAA), the National Aeronautics and Space Administration (NASA) and the National Oceanic and Atmospheric Administration (NOAA). Many chemtrail believers interpreted agency fact sheets as further evidence of the existence of a government cover-up. The EPA refreshed its posting in 2015.

In the early 2000s, the USAF released an undated fact sheet that stated the conspiracy theories were a hoax fueled in part by citations to a 1996 strategy paper drafted within their Air University titled Weather as a Force Multiplier: Owning the Weather in 2025. The paper was presented in response to a military directive to outline a future strategic weather modification system for the purpose of maintaining the United States' military dominance in the year 2025, and identified as "fictional representations of future situations/scenarios". The USAF further clarified in 2005 that the paper "does not reflect current military policy, practice, or capability" and that it is "not conducting any weather modification experiments or programs and has no plans to do so in the future". Additionally, the USAF states that the "'chemtrail' hoax has been investigated and refuted by many established and accredited universities, scientific organizations, and major media publications".

The conspiracy theories are seldom covered by the mainstream media, and when they are, they are usually cast as an example of anti-government paranoia. For example, in 2013, when it was made public that the CIA, NASA, and NOAA intended to provide funds to the National Academy of Sciences to conduct research into methods to counteract global warming with geoengineering, an article in the International Business Times anticipated that "the idea of any government agency looking at ways to control, or manipulate, the weather will be met with scrutiny and fears of a malign conspirac[y]", and mentioned chemtrail conspiracy theories as an example. Robert F. Kennedy Jr, United States Secretary of Health and Human Services since 2025, started supporting the conspiracy theory in 2024.

The conspiracy theory has inspired attempts at legislation in several US states. Some states, including Florida, have passed such laws. The Missouri Law Review discussed possibilities to regulate chemtrail misinformation legally in a 2020 article.

== Description ==
Proponents of the chemtrail conspiracy theory find support for their theories in their interpretations of sky phenomena, videos posted to the internet, and reports about government programs; they also have certain beliefs about the goals of the alleged conspiracy and the effects of its alleged efforts and generally take certain actions based on those beliefs.

The term chemtrail is a portmanteau of the words chemical and trail, just as contrail blends condensation and trail.

=== Interpretation of evidence ===
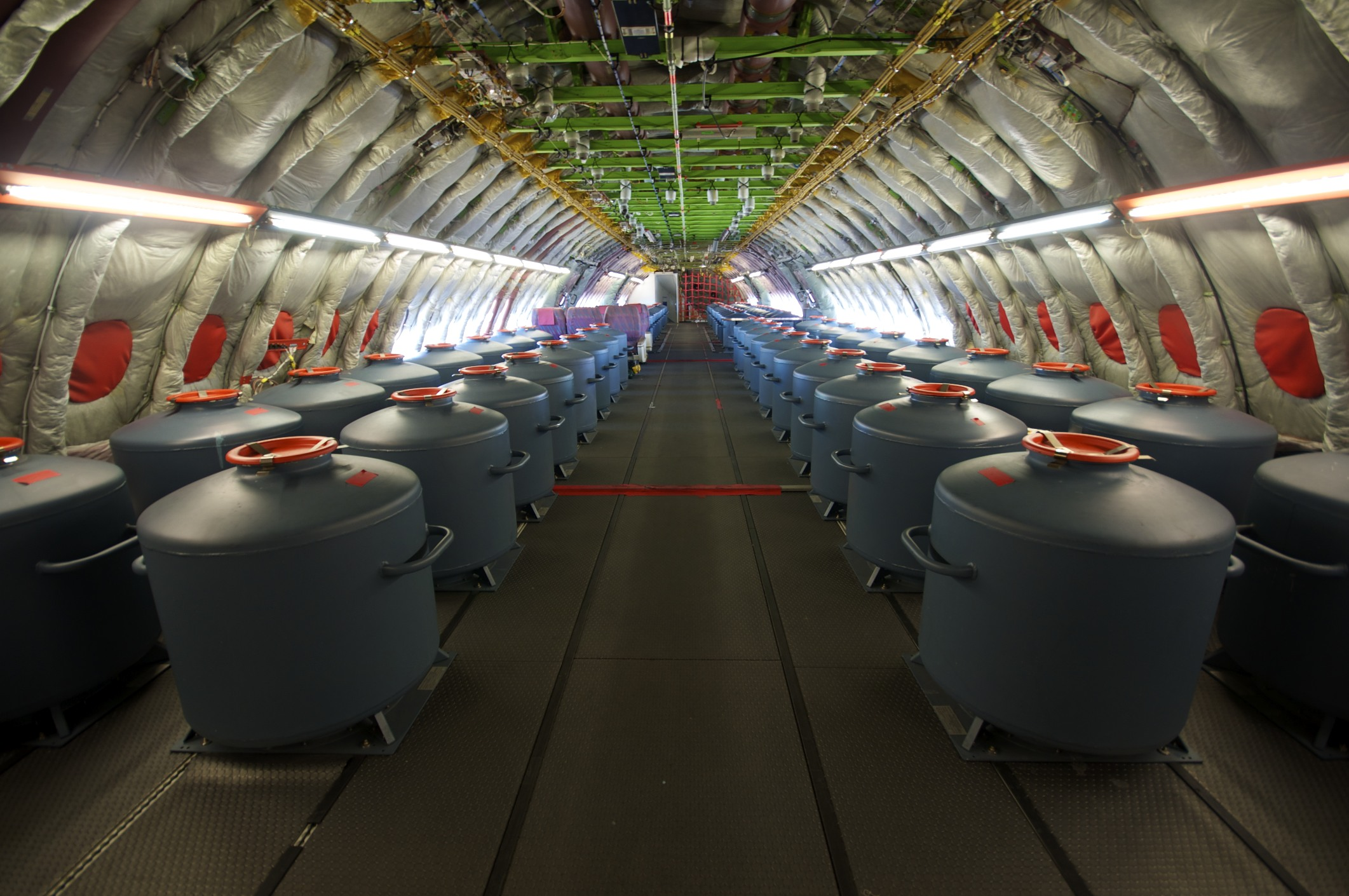
Airbus A380 water-filled tanks simulate passenger weight and distribution for different takeoff and landing displacement weights. Similar photographs are sometimes said to show chemtrail planes in action.

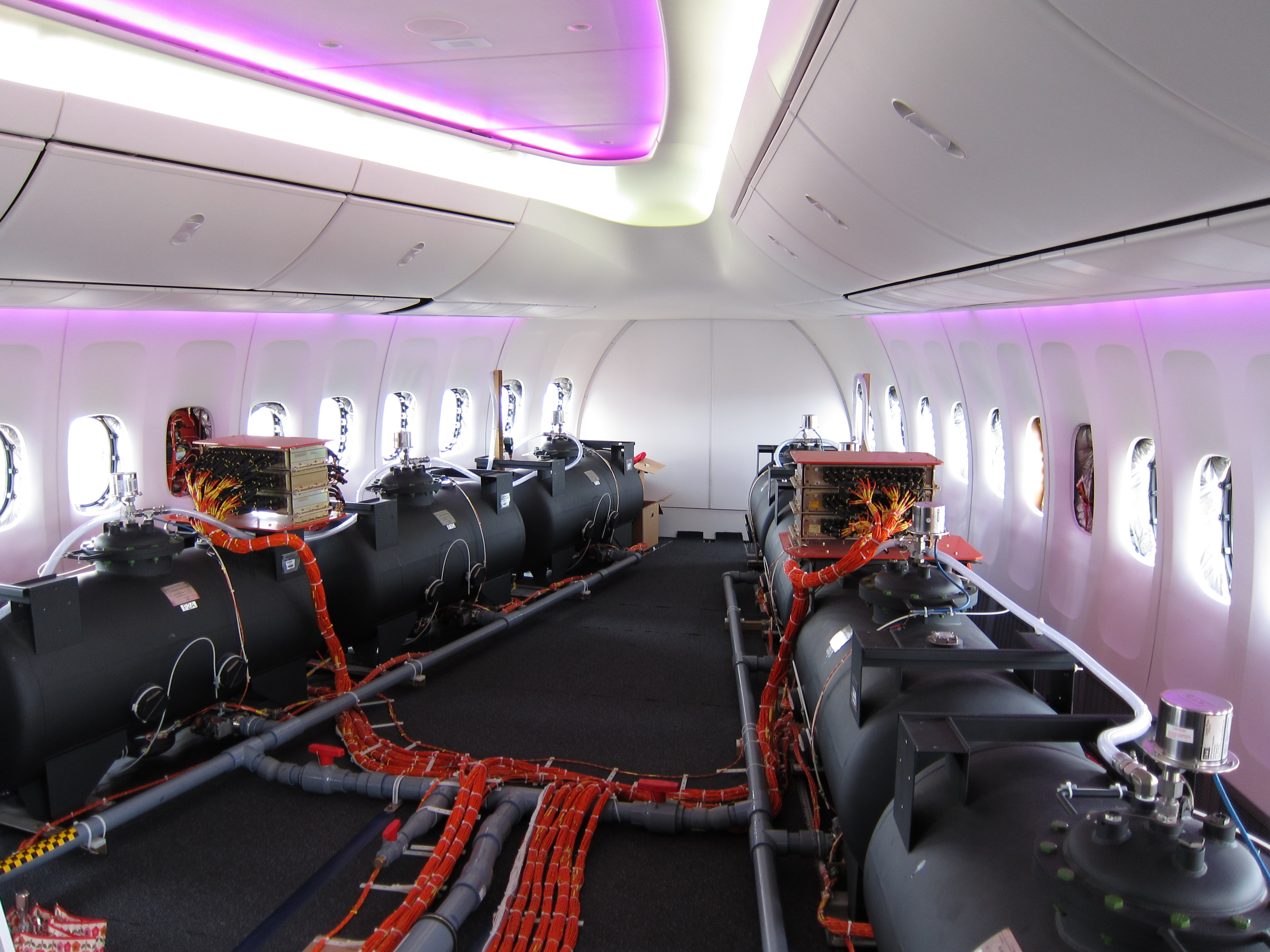
Ballast barrels with water in a prototype Boeing 747 flight-test plane

Proponents of the chemtrail conspiracy theory say that chemtrails can be distinguished from contrails by their long duration, asserting that the chemtrails are those trails left by aircraft that persist for as much as a half-day or transform into cirrus-like clouds. The proponents claim that after 1995, contrails had a different chemical composition and lasted a lot longer in the sky; proponents fail to acknowledge evidence of long-lasting contrails shown in World War II–era photographs.

Proponents characterize contrails as streams that persist for hours and that, with their criss-cross, grid-like, or parallel stripe patterns, eventually blend to form large clouds. Proponents view the presence of visible color spectra in the streams, unusual concentrations of sky tracks in a single area, or lingering tracks left by unmarked or military airplanes flying atypical altitudes or locations as markers of chemtrails.

Photographs of barrels installed in the passenger space of an aircraft for flight test purposes have been claimed to show aerosol dispersion systems. The barrels' actual purpose is to simulate the weight of passengers or cargo. The barrels are filled with water, and the water can be pumped from barrel to barrel to test different centers of gravity while the aircraft is in flight.

Former CIA employee and whistleblower Edward Snowden, interviewed on The Joe Rogan Experience, said he had searched through all the secret information of the U.S. government for evidence about (aliens and) chemtrails. According to a CNN report about the webcast, he said: "In case you were wondering: ... Chemtrails are not a thing" and "I had ridiculous access to the networks of the NSA, the CIA, the military, all these groups. I couldn't find anything".

Jim Marrs has cited a 2007 Louisiana television station report as evidence for chemtrails. In the report, the air underneath a crosshatch of supposed chemtrails was measured and apparently found to contain unsafe levels of barium: at 6.8 parts per million, three times the nationally recommended limit. But a subsequent analysis of the footage showed that the equipment had been misused and the reading exaggerated by a factor of 100—the true level of barium measured was both usual and safe.

In 2014, a video that went viral showed a commercial passenger airplane landing on a foggy night, which was described as emitting chemtrails. Discovery News pointed out that passengers sitting behind the wings would clearly see anything being sprayed, which would defeat any intent to be secretive, and that the purported chemical emission was normal air disruption caused by the wings, visible due to the fog. In that same year, in several photos of German chancellor Angela Merkel visiting the ILA Berlin Air Show, the water tanks next to her were falsely identified as toxic chemicals.

In October 2014, Englishman Chris Bovey filmed a video of a plane jettisoning fuel on a flight from Buenos Aires to London, which had to dump fuel to lighten its load for an emergency landing in São Paulo. The clip went viral on Facebook, with over three million views and more than 52,000 shares, cited as evidence of chemtrails. He later disclosed that the video post was done as a prank.

In some accounts, the chemicals are described as barium and aluminum salts, polymer fibers, thorium, or silicon carbide.

Chemtrail believers misinterpret the existence of cloud seeding programs and research into climate engineering as evidence of the conspiracy.

=== Beliefs ===
Various versions of the chemtrail conspiracy theory have been propagated via the internet and radio programs. There are websites dedicated to the conspiracy theory, and it is particularly favored by far-right groups because it fits well with a deep suspicion of the government.

A 2014 review of 20 chemtrail websites found that believers appeal to science in some of their arguments but do not believe what academic or government-employed scientists say; scientists and federal agencies have consistently denied that chemtrails exist, explaining the sky tracks are simply persistent contrails. The review also found that believers generally hold that chemtrails are evidence of a global conspiracy; they allege various goals which include profit (for example, manipulating futures prices, or making people sick to benefit drug companies), population control, or weapons testing (use of weather as a weapon, or testing bioweapons). One of these ideas is that clouds are being seeded with electrically conductive materials as part of a massive electromagnetic superweapons program based around the High Frequency Active Auroral Research Program (HAARP).

Believers say chemtrails are toxic; the 2014 review found that they generally hold that every person is under attack and often express fear, anxiety, sadness, and anger about this. A 2011 study of people from the US, Canada, and the UK found that 2.6% of the sample believed entirely in the conspiracy theory, and 14% believed it partially. An analysis of responses given to the 2016 Cooperative Congressional Election Study showed that 9% of the 36,000 respondents believed it was "completely true" that "the government has a secret program that uses airplanes to put harmful chemicals into the air" while a further 19% believed this was "somewhat true".

Chemtrail conspiracy theorists often describe their experience as being akin to a religious conversion experience. When they "wake up" and become "aware" of chemtrails, the experience motivates them to advocacy of various forms. For example, they often attend events and conferences on geoengineering, and have sent threats to academics working in geoengineering.

Some chemtrail believers adopt the notions of Wilhelm Reich, who devised a "cloudbuster" device from pipework. Reich claimed this device would influence weather and remove harmful energy from the atmosphere. Some chemtrail believers have built cloudbusters filled with crystals and metal filings, which are pointed at the sky in an attempt to clear it of chemtrails.

Chemtrail believers sometimes gather samples and have them tested, rather than rely on reports from government or academic laboratories, but their experiments are usually flawed; for example, collecting samples in jars with metal lids contaminates the sample and is not done in scientific testing.

=== Incidents ===
In 2001, in response to requests from constituents, U.S. Representative Dennis Kucinich introduced (but did not author) H.R. 2977 (107th), the Space Preservation Act of 2001, which would have permanently prohibited basing weapons in space, listing chemtrails as one of a number of "exotic weapons" that would be banned. Proponents have interpreted this explicit reference to chemtrails as official government acknowledgment of their existence. Skeptics noted that the bill in question also mentions "extraterrestrial weapons" and "environmental, climate, or tectonic weapons". The bill received an unfavorable evaluation from the United States Department of Defense and died in committee, with no mention of chemtrails appearing in the text of any of Kucinich's three subsequent failed attempts to enact a Space Preservation Act.

In 2003, in a response to a petition by concerned Canadian citizens that "chemicals used in aerial sprayings are adversely affecting the health of Canadians", the Government House Leader responded: "There is no substantiated evidence, scientific or otherwise, to support the allegation that there is high altitude spraying conducted in Canadian airspace. The term 'chemtrails' is a popularised expression, and there is no scientific evidence to support their existence." The House leader added, "it is our belief that the petitioners are seeing regular airplane condensation trails or contrails."

In 2005 in the United Kingdom, Elliot Morley, a Minister of State for the Department for Environment, Food and Rural Affairs was asked by David Drew, the Labour Party Member of Parliament for Stroud, "what research [the] Department has undertaken into the polluting effects of chemtrails for aircraft", and responded that "the Department is not researching into chemtrails from aircraft as they are not scientifically recognised phenomena", and that work was being conducted to understand "how contrails are formed and what effects they have on the atmosphere."

During the 2011–2017 California drought, some local politicians in Shasta County reacted credulously to conspiracy theories suggesting that weather-modifying chemtrails had caused the unusual weather conditions.

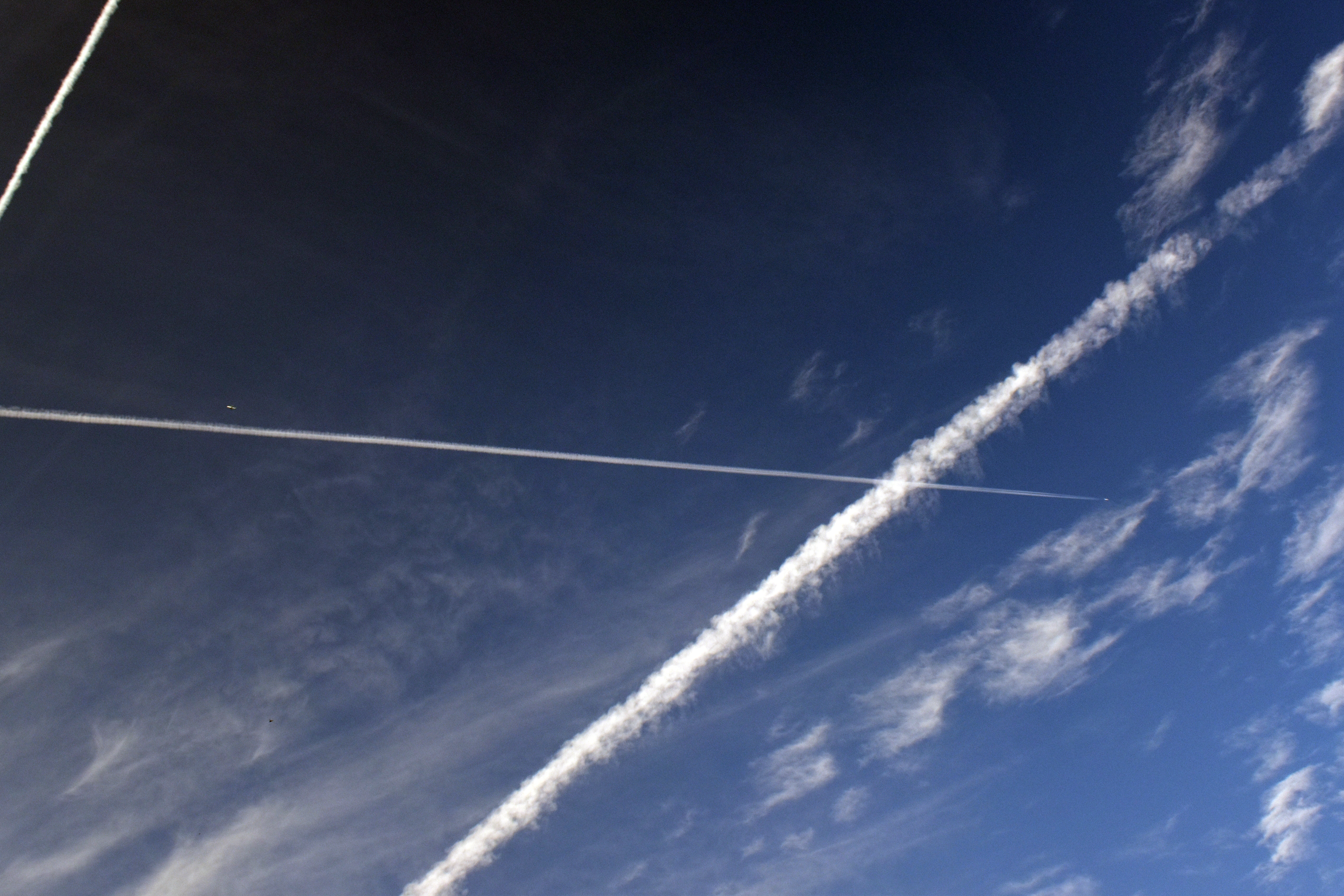
Intersecting contrails of cirrus clouds formed by aircraft engines

== Contrails ==
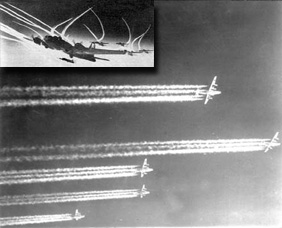
Contrails from propeller-driven aircraft engine exhaust, early 1940s

Contrails, or condensation trails, are "streaks of condensed water vapor created in the air by an airplane or rocket at high altitudes". Fossil fuel combustion (as in piston and jet engines) produces carbon dioxide and water vapor and soot particulates that act as cloud condensation nuclei. At high altitudes, the air is very cold. Hot humid air from the engine exhaust mixes with the colder surrounding air, causing the water vapor to condense into droplets or ice crystals that form visible clouds. The rate at which contrails dissipate is entirely dependent on weather conditions. If the atmosphere is near saturation, the contrail may exist for some time. Conversely, if the atmosphere is dry, the contrail will dissipate quickly.

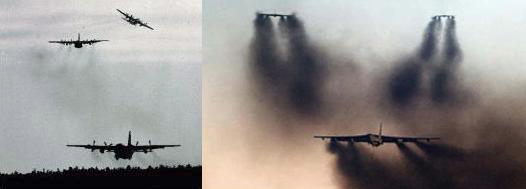
Exhaust gases and emissions

Wingtip condensation trails

It is well established by atmospheric scientists that contrails can persist for hours, and that it is normal for them to spread out into cirrus sheets. The different-sized ice crystals in contrails descend at different rates, which spreads the contrail vertically. Then the differential in wind speeds between altitudes (wind shear) results in the horizontal spreading of the contrail. This mechanism is similar to the formation of cirrus uncinus clouds. Contrails between 25,000 and 40,000 feet (7,600 and 12,200 m) can often merge into an "almost solid" interlaced sheet. Contrails can have a lateral spread of several kilometers, and given sufficient air traffic, it is possible for contrails to create an entirely overcast sky that increases the ice budget of individual contrails and persists for hours.

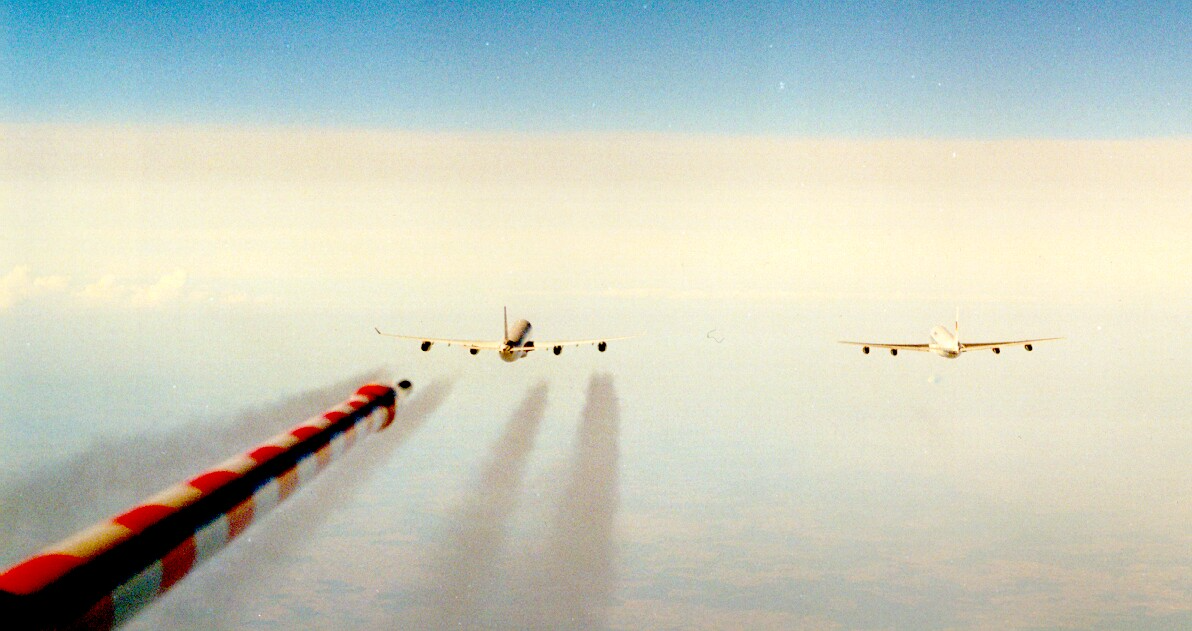
Contrail testing being carried out on an Airbus A340 (left) and much older Boeing 707 (right)

Experts on atmospheric phenomena say that the characteristics attributed to chemtrails are simply features of contrails responding to diverse conditions in terms of sunlight, temperature, horizontal and vertical wind shear, and humidity levels present at the aircraft's altitude. In the US, the gridlike nature of the National Airspace System's flight lanes tends to cause crosshatched contrails, and in general it is hard to discern from the ground whether overlapping contrails are at similar altitudes or not. The jointly published fact sheet produced by NASA, the EPA, the FAA, and NOAA in 2000 in response to alarms over chemtrails details the science of contrail formation and outlines the known and potential impacts that contrails have on temperature and climate. The USAF produced a fact sheet that described these contrail phenomena as observed and analyzed since at least 1953. It also rebutted chemtrail theories more directly by identifying the theories as a hoax and disproving the existence of chemtrails.

Patrick Minnis, an atmospheric scientist with NASA's Langley Research Center, has said that logic does not dissuade most chemtrail proponents: "If you try to pin these people down and refute things, it's, 'Well, you're just part of the conspiracy'".

Analysis of the use of commercial aircraft tracks for climate engineering has shown them to be generally unsuitable.

Astronomer Bob Berman has characterized the chemtrail conspiracy theory as a classic example of failure to apply Occam's razor, writing in 2009 that instead of adopting the long-established "simple solution" that the trails consist of frozen water vapor, "the conspiracy web sites think the phenomenon started only a decade ago and involves an evil scheme in which 40,000 commercial pilots and air traffic controllers are in on the plot to poison their own children".

A 2016 survey of 77 atmospheric scientists concluded that "76 out of 77 (98.7%) of scientists that took part in this study said they had not encountered evidence of a [secret large-scale atmospheric program] (SLAP), and that the data cited as evidence could be explained through other factors, such as typical contrail formation and poor data sampling instructions presented on SLAP websites".

== See also ==
- California drought manipulation conspiracy theory
- Cloud iridescence
- Cloud seeding
- Colored smoke
- Environmental effects of aviation
- Environmental engineering
- Geoengineering
- Herbicidal warfare
- LGBT chemicals conspiracy theory
- Mobile source air pollution
- Skywriting
- Solar geoengineering
- Stratospheric aerosol injection
