= Izadi =

Izadi (Persian: ایزدی, lit. "of God") is an Iranian surname which can also be found in the Iranian diaspora. Notable people with the surname include:

- Mehdi Izadi (born 1998), Iranian football player
- Mohsen Izadi, Iranian mechanical engineer
- Morteza Izadi Zardalou (born 1981), Iranian football player
- Mostafa Izadi, Iranian major general
- Saeed Izadi (1964–2025), Iranian brigadier general
