= The Aliens of Earth =

- Dust-jacket illustration by Ed Paschke.
- Author: Nancy Kress
- Illustrator: Jane Walker
- Cover artist: Ed Paschke
- Language: English
- Genre: Science fiction
- Publisher: Arkham House
- Publication date: 1993
- Publication place: United States
- Media type: Print (hardback)
- Pages: viii, 327
- ISBN: 0-87054-166-8
- OCLC: 27683053
- Dewey Decimal: 813/.54 20
- LC Class: PS3561.R46 A64 1993

The Aliens of Earth is a collection of science fiction stories by American writer Nancy Kress. It was released in 1993 and was the author's first book published by Arkham House . It was published in an edition of 3,520 copies. Most of the stories originally appeared in Isaac Asimov's Science Fiction Magazine.

== Contents ==
The Aliens of Earth contains the following stories:

1. "The Price of Oranges"
2. "Glass"
3. "People Like Us"
4. "Cannibals"
5. "To Scale"
6. "Touchdown"
7. "Down Behind Cuba Lake"
8. "In A World Like This"
9. "Philippa's Hands"
10. "Inertia"
11. "Phone Repairs"
12. "The Battle of Long Island"
13. "Renaissance"
14. "Spillage"
15. "The Mountain to Mohammed"
16. "Craps"
17. "And Wild For To Hold"
18. "In Memoriam"

== Sources ==
- Chalker, Jack L.; Mark Owings (1998). The Science-Fantasy Publishers: A Bibliographic History, 1923-1998. Westminster, MD and Baltimore: Mirage Press, Ltd. p. 59.
- Joshi, S.T. (1999). Sixty Years of Arkham House: A History and Bibliography. Sauk City, WI: Arkham House. pp. 163–164. ISBN 0-87054-176-5.
- Nielsen, Leon (2004). Arkham House Books: A Collector's Guide. Jefferson, NC and London: McFarland & Company, Inc. p. 138. ISBN 0-7864-1785-4.
