= Jack Skillingstead =

American writer

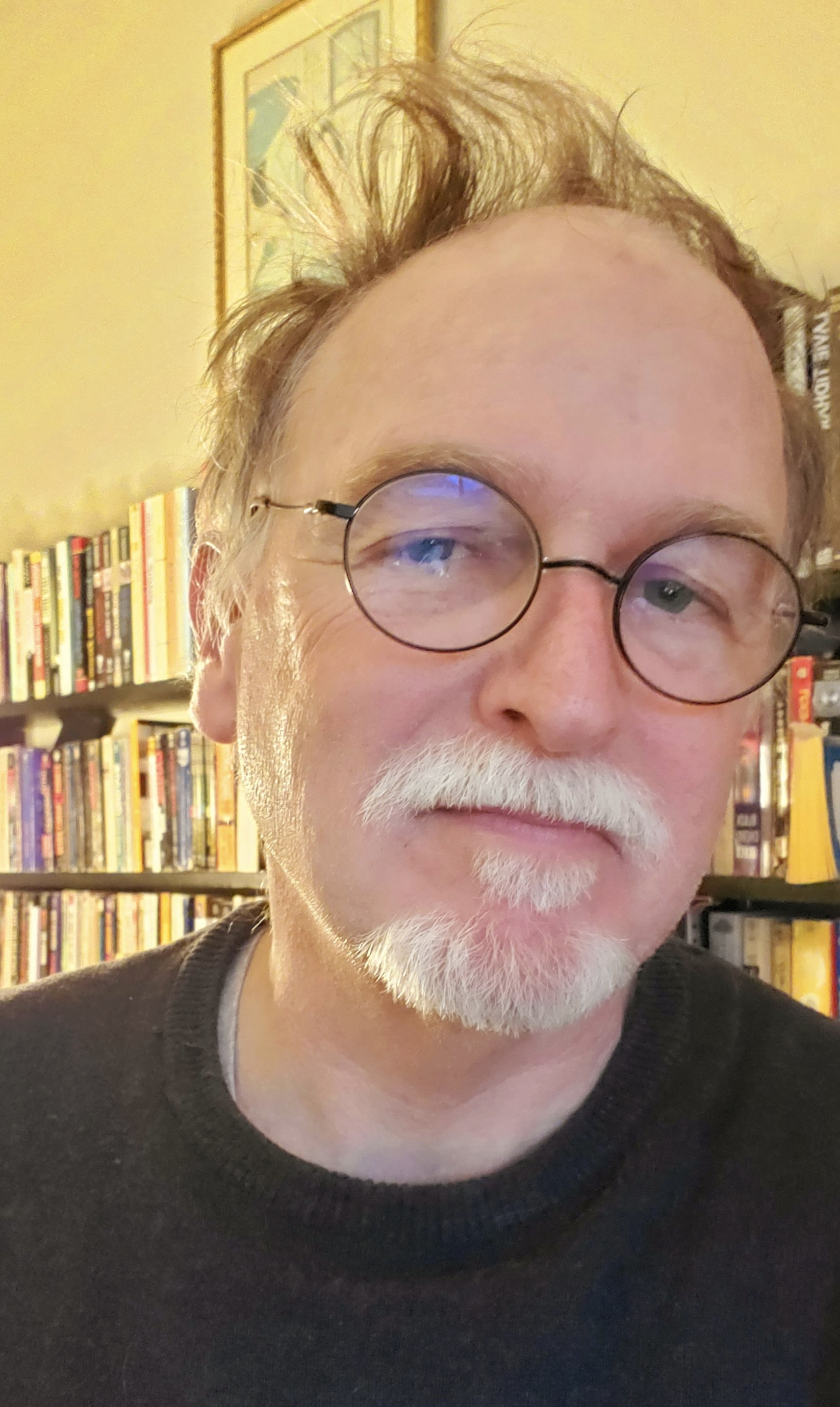
Jack Skillingstead 2024, Seattle

Jack Skillingstead (born October 24, 1955) is an American writer living in Seattle, Washington.

In 2001 Stephen King named Skillingstead a winner in King's "On Writing" contest. As of October 2024 Skillingstead has published forty-seven short stories in genre magazines and original anthologies. He has also published three novels and two story collections. His work has appeared in various Year's Best compilations and has been translated internationally. Skillingstead has been a finalist for the Philip K. Dick Award and the Theodore Sturgeon Memorial Award. On the Science Fiction Encyclopedia website, noted critic John Clute says, "Skillingstead's work so far augurs a major career." John Joseph Adams, editor of Lightspeed Magazine and series editor of Best American Science Fiction and Fantasy said of The Whole Mess and Other Stories that "this collection cements Jack Skillingstead as a master of the short form."

== Personal life ==
Skillingstead was born in 1955 and has lived most of his life in and around Seattle, Washington. He is the youngest of five siblings. In 2011 he married science fiction writer Nancy Kress. He has two children from a previous marriage.

== Bibliography ==
=== Novels ===
- Harbinger (Fairwood Press, 2009)
- Life On The Preservation (Solaris Books, 2013)
- The Chaos Function (John Joseph Adams Books/Houghton Mifflin Harcourt, 2019)

=== Short fiction ===
Collections

- Are You There and Other Stories (Golden Gryphon Press, 2009)
- The Whole Mess and Other Stories (Fairwood Press, 2023);

Stories

- The Apprentice (Whispers From The Shattered Forum, 2003)
- Hardwood (Glyph, 2003)
- Dead Worlds (Asimov's Science Fiction Magazine, 2003)
- Reunion (On Spec, 2004)
- Rewind (Asimov's Science Fiction Magazine, 2004)
- Transplant (Asimov's Science Fiction Magazine, 2004)
- Scatter (Asimov's Science Fiction Magazine, 2004)
- The Tree (On Spec, 2005)
- Bean There (Asimov's Science Fiction Magazine, 2005)
- Overlay (Asimov's Science Fiction Magazine, 2005)
- Are You There (Asimov's Science Fiction Magazine, 2006)
- Life on the Preservation (Asimov's Science Fiction Magazine, 2006)
- Girl in the Empty Apartment (Asimov's Science Fiction Magazine, 2006)
- Two (Talebones Magazine, 2007)
- The Chimera Transit (Asimov's Science Fiction Magazine, 2007)
- Scrawl Daddy (Asimov's Science Fiction Magazine, 2007)
- Thank You, Mr. Whiskers (Asimov's Science Fiction Magazine, 2007)
- Everyone Bleeds Through (Realms of Fantasy, 2007)
- Strangers on a Bus (Asimov's Science Fiction Magazine, 2007)
- What You Are About to See (Asimov's Science Fiction Magazine, 2008)
- Double Occupancy (Polu Texni: A Magazine of Many Arts, 2008)
- Cat in the Rain (Asimov's Science Fiction Magazine, 2008)
- Alone with an Inconvenient Companion (Fast Forward 2, 2008)
- Rescue Mission (The Solaris Book of New Science Fiction: Volume Three, 2009)
- Einstein's Theory (On Spec, 2009)
- Human Day (Asimov's Science Fiction Magazine, 2009)
- The Avenger of Love (Magazine of Fantasy & Science Fiction, 2009)
- Here's Your Space (Are You There and Other Stories, 2009)
- The Flow and Dream (Asimov's Science Fiction Magazine, 2011)
- Free Dog (Asimov's Science Fiction Magazine, 2011)
- Steel Lake (Solaris Rising: The New Solaris Book of Science Fiction, 2011)
- Arlington (Asimov's Science Fiction Magazine, 2013)
- Tribute (Mission: Tomorrow. Baen Books, 2015)
- Salvage opportunity (Clarkesworld Magazine, 2016)
- Licorice (Now We Are Ten. Newcon Press, 2016)
- The Savior Virus (Asimov's Science Fiction Magazine, 2016)
- The Despoilers (Clarkesworld Magazine, 2016)
- The Whole Mess (Asimov's Science Fiction Magazine, 2016)
- Destination (Asimov's Science Fiction Magazine, 2017)
- Mine, Yours, Ours (Chasing Shadows: Visions of Our Coming Transparent World, Tor Books, 2017)
- Assassins / co-written with Burt Courtier (Clarkesworld Magazine, 2017)
- The Last Garden (Lightspeed Magazine, 2017)
- The Sum of Her Expectations (Clarkesworld Magazine, 2017)
- Straconia (Asimov's Science Fiction Magazine, 2018)
- Dream Interpretation (Asimov’s Science Fiction Magazine, 2021)
- The President's Drone (The Whole Mess and Other Stories, FAIRWOOD PRESS, 2023)
- The Ledgers (Asimov's Science Fiction Magazine, 2024)
- Replacement Theory (Asimov’s Science Fiction Magazine, 2026)
