= Probability Moon =

2000 novel by Nancy Kress

- Author: Nancy Kress
- Cover artist: Bob Eggleton
- Language: English
- Series: Probability trilogy
- Genre: Science fiction
- Publisher: Tor Books
- Publication date: 2000
- Publication place: United States
- Media type: Print (hardback & paperback)
- Pages: 438
- ISBN: 0-7653-4341-X
- OCLC: 50673868
- Followed by: Probability Sun

Probability Moon is a 2000 science fiction novel by the American writer Nancy Kress. The novel concerns a xenological expedition to the planet World, where aliens live who have developed a strange form of telepathy or collective unconscious, "shared reality", which causes piercing "head-pain" whenever "Worlders" attempt to hold strongly differing opinions. Simultaneously, an artificial satellite is found in orbit of the planet which has uncharted powers, and may be the key to winning a war against a xenocidal alien race, the "Fallers".

== Setting ==
The "Probability" trilogy takes place in a galaxy that has been colonized by humans. This was made possible by the space tunnels, a network of FTL warp gates that were created by a now-lost progenitor race. Humanity is not united under a common government and political system. The Terrans have also discovered a number of alien races, most of them vastly similar in body format, living conditions and even DNA, leading to the hypothesis that the aforementioned progenitor race seeded the galaxy with sentient life, which then evolved according to the conditions on each planet. Of the known alien races, humanity is the only one that has reached space.

Humanity's understanding of the space tunnels is very limited, but several peculiar traits have been discovered. Firstly, if Ship A enters Tunnel 1, exits Tunnel 2 and then turns around and enters Tunnel 2 again, it will emerge from Tunnel 1 again. Unless Ship B emerges from Tunnel 2 in the interim, at which point Ship A will instead emerge from wherever Ship B entered. (The single tunnel leading to World is #438.) Secondly, objects can only enter the Tunnel if they are below a certain mass, about 100,000 tons; anything larger will actually fit into the aperture, but will collapse and explode. The threshold of what the tunnel can handle is determined by the object's Schwarzschild radius. Finally, nobody knows how the tunnels work. Macro-level quantum entanglement has been proposed, but it is so far out of the realm of current physics that nobody believes it.

The space tunnels also lead to the discovery of the Fallers, an alien race who refused to establish communications and immediately launched a war, which they are winning. No Faller has been captured alive—they prefer to suicide or kamikaze—but forensic examination of corpses indicate they evolved separately from humans, instead of being seeded by the progenitors. Like humanity, they were not an interstellar race until the discovery of a space tunnel in their system, though they have been closing the gap quickly. Unlike humans, they did not discover the tunnel independently; it was, in fact, a Terran craft emerging into their home system that catapulted them onto the interstellar stage.

The Probability novels shares two technological quirks with another of Nancy Kress' trilogies, the Beggars trilogy. In both stories, use of both genetic modification and behavior-regulating neuropharmacological drugs is commonplace. "Genemods" are applied in vitro, whereas those who adhere to the "Discipline" administer "neuropharms" daily to control their neurotransmitter balances, in a mix that can be altered depending on the activities of one's day and the mood one hopes to approach it with.

== Plot synopsis ==
Ahmed Bazargan (an Iranian) leads the team of diplomats who descend to the planet World. On his team are Dieter Gruber, a geologist; Ann Sikorski, a xenobiologist; and David Campbell Allen III, a graduate student in xenology. Their mission is to learn as much as possible about World, the Worlders and their culture, particularly the peculiar phenomenon of shared reality, which causes "head-pain" to those holding, or in the presence of someone holding, views contrary to the majority. This has had the drawback of limiting science, technology and progress; Worlders, though a far older species than Terrans, are somewhere around the Renaissance in terms of its technology. Bicycles are the cutting edge in personal transportation, each produced by artisans and individual craftsmen. On the other hand, there has never been a war on World; even the average barroom brawl causes intense head-pain. World's religion focuses on flowers; they believe that their people were created by the First Flower, which descended into the Neury Mountains, and much of their ceremony, both religious and every-day, involves blossoms. The sacredness of the mountains themselves is maintained by a wasting sickness inflicted on any who enter it.

The Terran contingent was delivered by the Zeus, a warship in the rather piecemeal Solar Alliance Defense Network. The diplomatic mission is merely a cover story for the military objective, which is headed by Colonel Dr. Syree Johnson (ret.), a soldier and military physicist. The true objective involves "Orbital Object #7", one of World's seven moons (known as "Tas" by the locals). It is in very low orbit, is clearly artificial, and was created by the same unknown progenitor race that created the space tunnels. Johnson's mission is to analyze Orbital Object #7, decipher its use, and discover if it can be used as a weapon. Whether it can or not, it is about nine times too large to fit through the tunnel, and Johnson and her team can think of no way to safely disassemble it.

Orbital Object #7 has fourteen bumps on the outside, each labeled with a number of their own dots: one, two, three, five, seven, eleven, and thirteen. The ancient builders' love for prime numbers is well-known; the space tunnels are marked with primes as well. It is theorized that the bumps are activating studs, and manipulating both bumps of one integer (they are on opposite sides, to avoid accidental activation by, say, a passing meteor) will trigger the artifact. When Orbital Object #7 is tested on setting one, it sends out a spherical wave that causes all nearby material higher than atomic number 75 (rhenium) to go radioactive—not by irradiating them with energy, but by manipulating the heretofore-untouchable strong nuclear force. Johnson and her team are still deciding what to do when a Faller scout craft (a "skeeter") emerges from Space Tunnel 438. The Zeus attempts to engage using particle beam weaponry, specifically a directed proton weapon, and are shocked when the beam passes through it instead of destroying it. (This has nothing to do with the strength of the weapon; proton beams utilize particles accelerated to a high percentage of the speed of light. Were the skeeter to land a shot on the Zeus, she would be destroyed as thoroughly as if vice versa. The advantage of a larger ship like the Zeus is in higher-ranged weaponry: it attacks the skeeter hours before the Faller can counterattack.) Johnson comes up with a theory that the proton beam is subject to the Heisenberg uncertainty principle, and is simultaneously composed of waves and particles until it is "observed" by someone - specifically the ship it shoots - at which point it resolves into a stream of particles and destroys whatever has just observed it. Evidently, the Fallers have discovered a way to alter the beam's "phase complex" to prevent the beam from resolving; essentially, the skeeter chooses not to "observe" the proton beam and is thus unaffected by it. The skeeter, having thus proven that ignorance is bliss, performs a close fly-by of Orbital Object #7 and then departs.

On World, Bazargan struggles particularly with David Allen, who is entranced by the forced altruism of shared reality and wishes to splice it into the human genome. He also liaises with the head of a rich trading family, Hadjil Pek Voratur, who sees plenty of chances for profit in the Terrans' advanced technology. He and his team, especially Pek Sikorski, are generally attended by Enli Pek Brimmidin, a household servant who picks up English with surprising speed. Enli, a point-of-view character, is a spy in the employ of the "Reality and Atonement" branch of World's government; her task is to gather information that will shed light on the question of whether Terrans are "real"—that is, subject to shared reality. This is not an idle concern: those few Worlders who are born without the ability or cannot socialize to it are quietly euthanized. Enli herself has been declared unreal, having murdered her brother, and has been assigned this task as atonement. Bazargan and Ann Sikorski eventually strike a bargain with Voratur, trading the secrets of antihistamines (for Worlders, flower-sickness is sacrilegious) for a chance to perform a "Lagerfeld" brain scan on him. They agree only after Voratur takes a dose of antihistamine himself (having commissioned Enli to steal it) and survives. One of the Worlders testing the first batch of home-made drug dies from it. The Lagerfeld scan is unable to pinpoint a specific place in the Worlder brain where shared reality nests, and Ann concludes that it did not evolve and is not genetic; David Allen refuses to believe this, and begins to suspect a conspiracy between Bazargan and the high priests of World.

Aboard the Zeus, Johnson and the other crew make the decision to push Orbital Object #7 out of orbit and towards Space Tunnel 438, in the hopes of breakthroughs during the five-day journey. She informs Bazargan of the action, including that, if necessary, they will destroy the artifact, possibly creating a destabilizing wave that could affect World. Bazargan goes to inform Voratur of this, only to have Voratur discover that Bazargan did not know that his mission was a cover story. This is binding proof: Terrans do not share reality. Their lives thus endangered, the Terrans, along with Enli, flee to the Neury Mountains, where no one will (or can) follow them. They are protected by environmental suits from the radiation, but they are still subject to a bizarre phenomenon: a slowing-down of the brain, a neurological phenomenon that only Enli remains unaffected by. Deep in the mountains, Gruber discovers a second alien artifact, similar to the one found in space but much smaller (perhaps 25 meters in diameter). It appears to have crash-landed on the planet millions of years ago (precipitating a mass extinction) and is putting out prodigious amounts of radiation. However, the radiation field is in the shape of a torus (a doughnut), and when the team moves into the "hole" of the field, Enli is not afflicted with the head-pains normally associated with unshared reality. Gruber theorizes that the field they passed through alters probability; this allows it to have an effect on human brain tissue because the release of neurotransmitters is a quantum-level event and thus susceptible to probability (indeed, nerve cells do not always release neurotransmitters, even when stimulated with exactly the same amount of voltage).

Speeding towards Space Tunnel 438, the Zeus is confronted by a Faller cruiser, and detaches from the artifact, which continues on at over 4,000 kilometers per second. The engagement is largely inconclusive until Orbital Object #7 actually enters the tunnel. Just prior to this, Dr. Johnson receives a transmission from the diplomatic team containing Gruber's theories on the probability field, and realizes that this could explain the Fallers' new shield. However, her speculation is short-lived; when Orbital Object #7 enters the tunnel and is subsequently destroyed by it, it fires off a destabilizing wave at its maximum setting (revealed in the sequel Probability Sun to have a range of about 6 billion kilometers, and to somehow be not susceptible to the inverse square law), which destroys the Zeus as well as all Faller craft, irradiates an outer planet in the World system, and then proceeds onward to World itself.

David Allen abducts Enli and drags her out of the mountains, passing through sections of high radiation to do so. Enli, wearing one of the team's four e-suits, is protected, but David takes thousands of rads. (Back with the team, Ann speculates that David is suffering from grandiose paranoid schizophrenia). The two then descend back down to civilization, where they proclaim to be real and explain that a "sky sickness" is coming. David teaches Worlders the proper techniques to shelter against radiation, and, having proclaimed his reality by dying for the sake of others, convinces the Worlders that Terrans do share reality. Meanwhile, Bazargan, Dieter and Ann receive the final transmission from the Zeus (having traveled 54 light-minutes to reach them), only to discover that Dieter's artifact reacted to the destruction of Orbital Object #7 when it was destroyed, once again implying macro-level entanglement. World is ultimately unaffected by the destabilizing wave, for reasons that are not revealed until the sequel. Armed with new hypotheses, the team is retrieved by Terran forces a few days later.

== Reception ==
Kirkus Reviews wrote that the book is "twisty and compelling, brimful of ideas with Kress’s usual life-sized characters", and called it a "top-notch work from a major talent". Roland Green of Booklist wrote that "Kress' characterizations are as sound as ever, but many will be agreeably surprised at her proficiency with military hardware and action scenes."

Jackie Cassada of Library Journal wrote that despite "occasionally reading more like a drawn-out short story rather than a novel", the book is a "fine debut by a writer with potential to grow". Publishers Weekly wrote that "Kress does a good job of working out the ramifications of her shared-reality society, but her human characters lack the depth of those in her best work" and that "her military figures in particular are thinly drawn" and "the physics, although interesting, is introduced in large, sometimes indigestible chunks that slow the plot to a crawl."
