= California drought manipulation conspiracy theory =

Weather modification conspiracy theory

The California drought manipulation conspiracy theory is a conspiracy theory that proposes that the 2011–2017 drought was a deliberate, man-made phenomenon, created by weather modification. It is largely promoted by a number of self-proclaimed "independent researchers" and "scientists", and by alternative news outlets. The theory has been dismissed by the scientific community and mainstream media as fringe science or pseudoscience.

== Key claims and components ==
The 2011–2017 drought inspired alarm among many, leading to the emergence of conspiracy theories purporting to explain the cause of a complex problem using oversimplified and non-evidence-based explanations.

Many of the proponents claim that chemtrails are used to affect storm clouds, in such a manner as to suppress the development of precipitation. This would occur because of the presence of too many cloud condensation nuclei, or "cloud seeds", in a single area. Others say that technologies similar to HAARP (a federal ionospheric research program, which was decommissioned in 2015), are being used to create a large and stubborn high-pressure area over the West Coast of the United States. They claim that this, also, discourages storms and rainfall.

Dane Wigington and his group GeoEngineering Watch were the most visible proponents of this theory. Wigington said that government agencies and other entities have economic and geopolitical motivations to manipulate the weather on the West Coast and elsewhere.

Proponents have claimed credibility for the theory, in part, as a result of a Los Angeles County cloud seeding program, begun in early 2016. This reinforced their view that government continues to engage in weather modification and/or climate engineering.
