= Probability Sun =

2001 novel by Nancy Kress

- First edition
- Author: Nancy Kress
- Cover artist: Bob Eggleton
- Language: English
- Series: Probability trilogy
- Genre: Science fiction
- Publisher: Tor Books
- Publication date: 2001
- Publication place: United States
- Media type: Print (hardback & paperback)
- Pages: 347
- ISBN: 978-0-7653-4355-0
- OCLC: 51638823
- Preceded by: Probability Moon
- Followed by: Probability Space

Probability Sun is a 2001 science fiction novel by American writer Nancy Kress, a sequel to her 2000 publication Probability Moon. It was followed in 2002 by Probability Space, which won the John W. Campbell Memorial Award.

The novel concerns a military expedition to the planet World, where aliens live who have developed a strange form of telepathy or collective unconscious, "shared reality", which causes piercing "head-pain" whenever "Worlders" attempt to hold strongly differing opinions. However, the expedition concerns a crash-landed alien artifact in the planet's crust which has uncharted powers, and may be the key to humanity winning a war against the "Fallers", a genocidal alien race.

== Setting ==
The Probability trilogy takes place in a galaxy that has been colonized by humans. This was made possible by the space tunnels, a network of FTL warp gates that were created by a now-lost progenitor race. Humanity is not united under a common government and political system; instead, the various governments in the Solar System and beyond have united as the "Solar Alliance Defense Network" in light of the war against the Fallers. The Terrans have also discovered a number of alien races, most of them vastly similar in body format, living conditions and even DNA, leading to the hypothesis that the aforementioned progenitor race seeded the galaxy with sentient life, which then evolved according to the conditions on each planet. Of the known alien races, humanity is the only one that has reached space.

Humanity's understanding of the space tunnels is very limited, but several peculiar traits have been discovered. For one: if Ship A enters Tunnel 1, exits Tunnel 2 and then turns around and enters Tunnel 2 again, it will emerge from Tunnel 1 again... Unless Ship B emerges from Tunnel 2 in the interim, at which point Ship A will instead emerge from wherever Ship B entered. (The single tunnel leading to World is #438, which gives an idea of how carefully passage through heavily used tunnels must be coordinated.) For two, objects can only enter the Tunnel if they are below a certain mass, about 100,000 tons; anything larger will actually fit into the aperture, but will collapse and explode. The threshold of what the tunnel can handle is determined by the object's Schwarzschild radius. Finally, nobody knows how the tunnels work. At all. Macro-level quantum entanglement has been proposed, but it is so far out of the realm of current physics that nobody believes it.

The space tunnels also lead to the discovery of the Fallers, an alien race who refused to establish communications and immediately launched a war, which they are winning. No Faller has been captured alive—they prefer to suicide or kamikaze—but forensic examination of corpses indicate they evolved separately from humans, instead of being seeded by the progenitors. Like humanity, they were not an interstellar race until the discovery of a space tunnel in their system, though they have been closing the gap quickly. Unlike humans, they did not discover the tunnel independently; it was, in fact, a Terran craft emerging into their home system that catapulted them onto the interstellar stage.

The Probability novels shares two technological quirks with another of Nancy Kress' trilogies, the Beggars trilogy: in both stories, use of both genetic modification and behavior-regulating neuropharmacological drugs is commonplace. "Genemods" are applied in vitro, whereas those who adhere to the "Discipline" administer "neuropharms" daily to control their neurotransmitter balances, in a mix that can be altered depending on the activities of one's day and the mood one hopes to approach it with.

== Plot synopsis ==
While the human race struggles at war with the Fallers, an advanced alien race, an artifact is discovered which might be the key to a lost science, be a weapon itself, or a doomsday device.

== Reception ==
Both Kirkus Reviews and Publishers Weekly gave the book favorable reviews.
