= Out of All Them Bright Stars =

1985 short story by Nancy Kress

"Out of All Them Bright Stars" is a science fiction short story by Nancy Kress. It was first published in The Magazine of Fantasy and Science Fiction in 1985.

== Synopsis ==
Sally Gourley is a waitress at a diner who watches as an alien tries to order a meal, only to have events spin out of control. Kress has observed that Gourley is "powerless because of her class, not her gender".

== Reception ==
"Out of All Them Bright Stars" won the 1986 Nebula Award for Best Short Story.
