= Mohsen Izadi =

Iranian chemist

- محسن ایزدی
- Scientific career
- Fields: mechanical engineer
- Institutions: Lorestan University

Mohsen Izadi is an Iranian mechanical engineer and Professor at Lorestan University. He is among the top 2% most-cited scientists in the world. Izadi is known for his research on heat transfer and nanomaterials.
