= Mehdi Izadi =

Iranian footballer

Personal information
- Full name: Mehdi Izadi
- Date of birth: November 28, 1998 (age 27)
- Place of birth: Iran
- Position: Forward

Team information
- Current team: Naft MIS
- Number: 70

Youth career
- –2020: Rayka Babol

Senior career*
Years	Team	Apps	(Gls)
2020–	Naft MIS	3	(0)
- * Club domestic league appearances and goals as of 9 December 2020

Mehdi Izadi (Persian: مهدی ایزدی) is an Iranian football forward who currently plays for Naft Masjed Soleyman in the Persian Gulf Pro League.
