= Fountain of Age =

2007 novella by Nancy Kress

- Short story by Nancy Kress
- Language: English
- Genre: Science fiction novella

Publication
- Published in: Asimov's Science Fiction
- Publication type: Magazine
- Publication date: July 2007

"Fountain of Age" is a science fiction novella published in 2007 by Nancy Kress. It won the 2008 Nebula Award for Best Novella and was nominated for the 2008 Hugo Award for Best Novella.

== Plot summary ==
The story is about Max Feder, a wealthy reformed criminal who tries to contact his now-famous former lover, Daria, whose brain tumors have the ability to generate spare stem cells.
