= Kim Gwang-su =

South Korean volleyball player

Personal information
- Nationality: South Korean
- Born: 4 November 1939 (age 85)

Sport
- Sport: Volleyball

Kim Gwang-su (born 4 November 1939) is a South Korean volleyball player. He competed in the men's tournament at the 1964 Summer Olympics.
