= Kim Kwang-soo =

South Korean neuroscientist

- Born: 1954 (age 71–72)
- Education: Seoul National University Korea Advanced Institute of Science and Technology
- Known for: Molecular Neurobiology and stem cell biology
- Awards: First Award Grant from NIMH (1992); NARSAD Independent Award (2000); NARSAD Independent Award II (2003); NIH Director's RO1 Award(2010); Ilchon Science Award (2012)
- Scientific career
- Fields: Neuroscience and Stem cell biology
- Workplaces: McLean Hospital Harvard Medical School
- Doctoral advisor: Dewey D Ryu

- Kim Kwang-soo
- Hangul: 김광수
- RR: Gim Gwangsu
- MR: Kim Kwangsu

Kim Kwang-soo (born 1954) is a South Korean neuroscientist.

== Education ==
- B.S. Seoul National University, Department of Microbiology (1977)
- M.S. Korea Advanced Institute of Science and Technology (KAIST), Biological Science and Engineering (1979)
- Ph.D. Korea Advanced Institute of Science and Technology (KAIST), Biological Science and Engineering (Dewey D. Ryu) (1983)
- M.S.(hon.) Harvard Medical School, Neuroscience (2011)

Postdoctoral Training

- Postdoc. Fellow, MIT, Dept. of Biology (Molecular Genetics; Lenny Guarente, 1983–1985)
- Postdoc. Associate, MIT, Dept. of Biology (Molecular Genetics; Lenny Guarente, 1987–1989)

== Work ==
Kim is a Professor and Director at the Molecular Neurobiology Laboratory, McLean Hospital, Harvard Medical School. He has over 20 year experiences to investigate molecular neurobiology of midbrain dopamine neuronal system in health and disease, focusing on elucidating the genetic network of intrinsic signaling molecules and extrinsic transcription factors for development and maintenance of dopamine neurons. He is also investigating stem cell biology and has pioneered to generate human induced pluripotent stem (iPS) cells by protein-based reprogramming methods and demonstrated that these protein-iPS cells can efficiently generate functional dopamine neurons. He is currently focused on translating his neuroscience and stem cell research to potential therapeutic development for brain disorders such as Parkinson's disease, Alzheimer's disease, and inflammatory diseases.

== Awards ==
- Scholarship from Seoul National University (1974–1977)
- Graduated with the highest departmental honor (Department of Microbiology, Seoul National University) (1977)
- Graduated with the highest departmental honor (Department of Biological Science and Technology, KAIST) (1979)
- National Full Scholarship for Graduate Study at KAIST (1977–1982)
- National Scholarship and Travel Award for the Study in U.S. (1983–1984)
- First Award Grant from NIMH (1992–1998)
- NARSAD Independent Award (2000–2005)
- Society of Bioscience Research (SBR) Bioscience Award (2003)
- Lead Reviewer Award from Stem Cells (2006)
- NIH Director's Opportunity Grant (top 3%) (2010–2013)
