= Beggars in Spain =

1993 novel by Nancy Kress

- Cover of first edition (hardcover)
- Author: Nancy Kress
- Cover artist: Kenneth Jackson
- Language: English
- Series: Sleepless series
- Genre: Science fiction
- Publisher: William Morrow and Company
- Publication date: 1993
- Publication place: United States
- Media type: Print (Hardcover & Paperback)
- Pages: 438
- ISBN: 0-688-12189-6
- OCLC: 26219018
- Dewey Decimal: 813/.54 20
- LC Class: PS3561.R46 B4 1993
- Followed by: Beggars and Choosers

Beggars in Spain is a 1993 science fiction novel by American writer Nancy Kress. It was originally published as a novella with the same title in Isaac Asimov's Science Fiction Magazine and as a limited edition paperback by Axolotl Press in 1991. Kress expanded it, adding three additional parts to the novel, and eventually two sequels, Beggars and Choosers (1994) and Beggars Ride (1996). It is held to be an important work, and is often hailed for its predictions of emerging technologies and society.

The original novella won the Hugo Award and Nebula Award. The novel was also nominated for both the Hugo Award and the Nebula Award, but did not win.

== Plot introduction ==
Beggars in Spain and its sequels take place in a future where genetic engineering has become a reality, and society and culture face the consequences of genetic modifications (genemods), particularly in the United States. The story revolves around the existence of the "Sleepless": individuals genetically modified to not need sleep, who have greater potential for intelligence and accomplishment than ordinary humans, called "Sleepers".

The world of Beggars in Spain is also powered by cold fusion, named "Y-energy" after its pioneer Kenzo Yagai. Yagai also founded "Yagaiism", a moral worldview Kress based on objectivism, in which dignity is solely the product of what a person can achieve through his or her own efforts, and the contract is the basis of society. As a corollary, the weak and unproductive are not owed anything.

The novel's title comes from its primary moral question, as presented by character Tony Indivino: what do productive and responsible members of society owe the "beggars in Spain", the unproductive masses who have nothing to offer except need? This is underscored by the rift between the Sleepers and the Sleepless; the Sleepless are superior in mind and body, and easily capable of outperforming their normal cousins. All men are not created equal. Where, then, is the line between equality and excellence? How far should any superior minority hold themselves back for fear of engendering feelings of inadequacy in their inferiors?—especially if this minority is not hated and feared, but rather the elite? This question is explored, but not elaborated on by the novel.

Nancy Kress has explained that the book, and the trilogy generally, grapples with the conflicting principles of Ayn Rand on one hand and Ursula K. Le Guin's picture of communist-like community on the other.

== Plot summary ==
=== Book I (the original novella) ===
Leisha Camden, born in 2008, is the twenty-first human being to have the genemod for sleeplessness. She is the daughter of one of Yagai's most noted sponsors, financier Roger Camden, who felt he had wasted far too much of his life in sleep, and his wife Elizabeth Camden, an Englishwoman who wanted a normal child. Sleeplessness confers a number of secondary benefits—higher IQ and a sunnier disposition most notably, as well as 50% more productive time (vs the time the unmodified spend asleep); Sleepless not only don't need sleep, they cannot sleep (though they can be knocked unconscious).

By the age of fifteen Leisha has become a part of the community of Sleepless, few though there are in the world; she, like all of them, is several grades ahead of her age; the oldest, Kevin Baker, has already become the most wealthy computer software designer since Bill Gates at the age of 16 (in 2020). The first she meets, Richard Keller, becomes her lover; the others become friends and confidants. Two, however, trouble her. One is Tony Indivino, whose mother had problems adjusting to his Sleepless ways and forced him to live as a "Sleeper." Tony advocates a banding-together of all Sleepless in a sort of socio-economic fortress. He predicts that the Sleepers will soon begin to discriminate against Sleepless, and is quickly proved right: a Sleepless athlete is barred from the Olympics, for instance, because her 16-hour practice days are impossible for other competitors to compete with. Likewise some cities forbid Sleepless from running "24-hour" convenience stores. Tony is eventually jailed (for illegal actions on behalf of the Sleepless community), though not before attracting the attention of Jennifer Sharifi, the other person who makes Leisha nervous. The Sleepless daughter of a movie star and an Arab oil tycoon, Jennifer's money purchases land in upstate New York (Cattaraugus County, specifically) to create a Sleepless-only community known as Sanctuary. Finally, Leisha faces rocky relations with her twin sister Alice. By sheer chance, Elizabeth conceived a natural daughter at the same time Leisha was implanted in vitro, resulting in fraternal twins, only one of whom is Sleepless. Alice is constantly in her sister's shadow: "Whatever was yours was yours, and whatever wasn't yours was yours, too. That's the way Daddy set it up. The way he hard-wired it into our genes."

When Leisha is approaching her bar exams at the age of 22, her father dies of old age. On the drive home from the funeral, Leisha's surrogate mother Susan Melling (not only Roger Camden's second wife, but the genetic researcher who devised Sleeplessness) reports some startling news. Bernie Kuhn, a Sleepless in Seattle, has died due to a road accident at the age of 17. Autopsy reveals every one of his organs is in pristine condition. Evidently Sleeplessness unlocks a heretofore-unknown cell regeneration system. The bottom line is that Sleepless will not physically age. Their estimated lifespan is totally unknown. They might be immortal.

Leisha passes her exams, but shortly thereafter she is informed by Richard that various acts of prejudice and violence against Sleepless have culminated in the murder of Tony Indivino by fellow inmates. The Sleepless have no choice but to retreat to Sanctuary. However, Leisha is sent out on one last errand of mercy: a Sleepless child, Stella Bevington, is being abused by her parents. Alice turns the tables by masterminding and almost singlehandedly carrying out the kidnapping, not only saving both Leisha and Stella but proving that even the most privileged and elite can be beggars too. Leisha is left with the revelation that trade is not linear, but rather an ecology, and that today's beggar may be tomorrow's savior.

=== Book II (2051) ===
The book opens on Jordan Watrous, Alice's son (born 2025), an employee at a We-Sleep factory. The "We-Sleep" movement is an attempt by founder Calvin Hawke to rejuvenate working-class pride by buying and selling only products made by Sleepers; despite the fact that the products themselves are often shoddy and over-priced, revenues have been lucrative. He shepherds his aunt Leisha on a tour of the factory; afterwards she meets with Hawke to "rail against stupidity;" since America is founded on the premise that all men should be treated equally, encouraging class hatred will only lead to destruction.

Leisha then receives an unusual client at her law firm: a genetic researcher, Dr. Adam Walcott, who claims to have discovered a post-partum gene therapy to turn Sleepers into Sleepless. Unfortunately for him, his research has been stolen from the safe-deposit box in which he left it; even worse, his patents have already been filed ... In the name of Sanctuary, Incorporated. Thankfully, the research is incomplete, but evidently Sanctuary is concerned about keeping its edge. Leisha asks Susan Melling to attempt to complete it and determine its legitimacy.

Leisha also discovers that Sanctuary Council leader-for-life Jennifer Sharifi has decided to institute a loyalty oath, in which all Sleepless swear to place the needs of Sanctuary above their own. Jennifer has always been convinced of the need to protect her people from the Sleepers, but her husband, Richard Keller, has his own reservations about the paranoid atmosphere his children are being fostered in. He doesn't think his wife is capable of murder, though ... Until Jennifer is indicted for the murder, via sabotage and destruction of his vehicle (a We-Sleep scooter), of Dr. Walcott's primary research partner.

The People vs. Jennifer Fatima Sharifi is a circus. Though the sabotage was clearly performed by a Sleepless, a piece of jewelry that serves as Sanctuary's equivalent of a garage-door opener was found on the scene, which no Sleepless would be sloppy enough to leave behind. Meanwhile, Leisha's life is slowly unraveling: Sanctuary has voted in the oath of solidarity and, furthermore, voted to ban Leisha for life; her partner Kevin Baker chooses to take the oath and abandon her; Stella Bevington, the closest thing she has to a daughter, is considering the same; and Susan is dying of an incurable brain condition. Fortunately, Alice comes to save the day, knowing (evidently through twin ESP) that her sister needs her; Stella confesses that the pendant is hers, which was stolen from her at a party; and Susan discovers that Walcott's research is a sham, completely infeasible. With that information, Leisha now knows who has orchestrated the entire campaign: Calvin Hawke. He stole the pendant from Stella at a house-warming party Alice threw; he propagated the research, which he knew to be false, hoping that Sanctuary would react as it did; and, for reasons that remain unspecified, he had Walcott's assistant killed. The volume ends with Leisha on retreat with Susan and Alice, and Jennifer informing her children that she will keep them safe: Sanctuary is moving into space.

=== Book III (2075) ===
In the year of America's tricentennial, society appears stable under a newly established three-tiered social structure. At the bottom are the "Livers," who make up 80% of the population. They are generally undereducated but enjoy comfortable lives filled with leisure. The "Donkeys" form the administrative and professional workforce, managing essential infrastructure and holding public office through elections influenced by the Livers' support and popular entertainment. At the top are the "Sleepless," whose contributions drive most technological, genetic, and scientific advancements.

Two new faces swiftly turn the tables. One arrives at Leisha's Susan Melling Foundation in New Mexico, a ten-year-old Liver named Drew Arlen. He is intent on enrolling in the Foundation, which (in Leisha's words) "asks beggars why they're beggars and provides funding for those who want to be something else." Drew has charisma and a harmless nature, but runs afoul of Eric Bevington-Watrous, second son of Jordan and Stella; a fistfight between the two leaves Drew paralyzed from the waist down. Attending various private schools, Drew finds a flair for artistic expression, but consistently fails or flunks out of each of them; by nineteen he has becomes a delinquent. Eric forces him into an experimental therapy in which the pathways between the limbic system and the neocortex are strengthened, supposedly forcing the brain to cope with its more primitive, bestial nature. In Drew, the treatment backfires, and he gains access to a sort of genetic collective unconscious, which he perceives in visual terms (in the next book, in which Arlen is a first-person narrator, he constantly describes people, things, concepts and emotions as having shape, texture, color and so on). Drew learns to project these shapes in holographic form and becomes the Lucid Dreamer, a performance artist who places his viewers in a waking dream, the contents of which are determined by the holograms.

The other new face is born at Sanctuary Orbital: Miranda Serena Sharifi, the first of the "Superbrights." Her genemods cause her brain to operate at three or four times the speed of a standard Sleepless, at the cost of muscle control (she and all the other Supers, including her brother Tony, twitch, jerk and vibrate with "manic vitality"). Within the first few years of Miri's life, it becomes clear that she and all the other Supers think differently than do normal Sleepless; their thoughts take the form of "strings," which are entire piles of data arranged in geometric shapes and involving analogy and cross-reference. Her growth is set against a Sanctuary becoming even more careful and even more suspicious of the earth-bound Sleeper haters. Five children have been conceived that, through regression to the mean, lack the dominant Sleeplessness gene, and Jennifer is obsessed with declaring Sanctuary independent of America. To that end, Sharifi Enterprises begins research into an airborne, instantly-fatal biological weapon which can be used as a deterrent.

=== Book IV (2091) ===
In 2080 the United States loses its exclusive patents on Y-energy, leading to a massive economic depression. In October 2091, a new sliding-scale tax package is proposed to take advantage of the huge revenues going to Sanctuary Inc. and all associated businesses, which are, after all, incorporated in America. (To be specific, Sanctuary Inc. will be taxed a staggering 92% of total income.) With this in mind, Jennifer and the Sanctuary Council prepare to bid for their independence.

Miri starts the volume with a trauma: her beloved younger brother Tony receives neural injury in a playground accident. Regardless of the total damage to his person and faculties, he will doubtless need to sleep for at least a portion of the day. Miri flies into a rage when Jennifer reminds her of Sanctuary's Yagaiist, community-first philosophy, and must be sedated; when she wakes, she is told that Tony has died of his injuries. Regardless, she and the other Supers band together for defense, recognizing that the Sleepless of Sanctuary have become so nervous of outsiders that even the Supers, created by the community and to serve it, constitute a threat due to their sheer alienness. Miri names the group "the Beggars."

Miri's thought-strings—indeed, the thought-strings of every Super—have had structural flaws from the beginning, gaps where information ought to go that they don't have. Miri rectifies this gap when she is introduced to one of Drew Arlen's Lucid Dreaming concerts; the ability to tap into their unconscious allows the Supers to make a number of technological, medical and conceptual breakthroughs, including allowing Miri to cure the twitching and stuttering. The Beggars decide to install defensive overrides throughout Sanctuary's systems so that they can take over if necessary, discovering in the process the Sharifi Enterprises bioweapon. Packets of the organism have been secreted in several cities across the United States and it can be deployed at the touch of a button.

On 1 January 2092 Sanctuary declares independence from the United States of America. The Internal Revenue Service decides to wait until non-payment of taxes on January 15 and then seize the orbital as collateral, but before then Sanctuary demonstrates its bioweapon on a cattle-ranching space station purchased solely for the purpose (all human tenants were evicted prior to the demonstration). The stand-off is averted when Miri and the Beggars use their overrides to force Sanctuary to stand down. Jennifer refuses Miri's offer to surrender in exchange for immunity to the rest of the Council, proving that "all of Sanctuary's political philosophy ... comes down to [Jennifer's] personal needs."

The novel ends with Miri and the Superbrights moving to the Susan Melling Foundation complex in New Mexico, and Leisha deciding to act as the counsel for the defense in Jennifer Sharifi's trial. There are, after all, no permanent beggars in Spain.

== Translations ==
- German: "Bettler in Spanien", 1997, Heyne Verlag, Munich, ISBN 3-453-12655-6
- Russian: "Испанские нищие" ("Spanish beggars"), 1997, ISBN 5-697-00121-5
- Spanish: "Mendigos en España", 1997, Bolsillo Byblos, ISBN 84-666-2840-1
- Polish: "Hiszpańscy żebracy", 1996, Prószyński i S-ka, ISBN 8386868562
