= Bob Berman =

American astronomer and writer

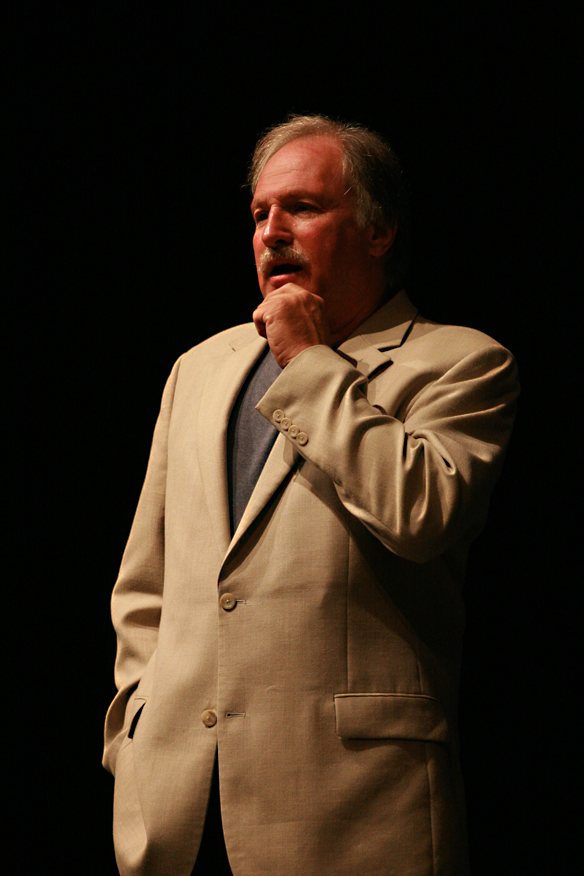
Bob Berman at IdeaFestival 2009

Robert Berman, known as Bob Berman, is an American astronomer, author, and science popularizer. He runs Overlook Observatory in Woodstock, New York, USA. He was an adjunct professor of astronomy at New York’s Marymount College located in Westchester County, from 1996 to 2000 and has appeared on CBS This Morning, the Today Show, and the Late Show with David Letterman.

== Biography ==
In 1976, Berman founded the Catskill Astronomical Society. From 1986 to 1994 he created and directed the summer astronomy program at Yellowstone National Park. He was the "Sky Lights" and "Night Watchman" astronomy columnist for Discover from 1989 to 2006. He was Astronomy Magazine's "Strange Universe" columnist between January 1992 and February 2024 and remains a contributing editor.

He also is the astronomy editor of The Old Farmer's Almanac. He has led aurora and eclipse expeditions as far away as the Arctic and Antarctic.

Berman conducts a weekly radio broadcast, "Skywindow", and a monthly, hour-long call-in show on Northeast Public Radio. He was keynote speaker at Starfest 2007. He is also heard nightly on Slooh.com

== Bibliography ==
- Berman, Bob (1995). Secrets of the night sky : the most amazing things in the universe you can see with the naked eye. Illustrations by Alan McKnight. New York: Morrow.
- — (July 1995). "Slipping toward Vega". Night Watchman. Discover. 16 (7): 40.
- — (August 1995). "Moon showers". Discover. 16 (8): 41.
- — (1996). Secrets of the night sky : the most amazing things in the universe you can see with the naked eye. Illustrations by Alan McKnight (Paperback ed.). New York: Harper Perennial.
- — (January 1996). "Your stars in 1996". Night Watchman. Discover. 17 (1): 14.
- — (February 1996). "The last great evening star". Night Watchman. Discover. 17 (2): 37.
- — (April 1996). "Just a coincidence?". Night Watchman. Discover. 17 (4): 39.
- — (1998). Cosmic adventure : a renegade astronomer's guide to our world and beyond. Morrow.
- — (2003). Strange universe. Henry Holt, Times Books.
- — (2007). Shooting for the Moon. Lyons Press.
- Lanza, Robert & Bob Berman (2009). Biocentrism : how life and consciousness are the keys to understanding the true nature of the universe. BenBella.
- Berman, Bob (2011), The Sun's Heartbeat: And Other Stories From the Life of the Star That Powers Our Planet; Little Brown, ISBN 978-0-316-09101-5
- Berman, Bob (2014), ZOOM: How Everything Moves, From Atoms and Galaxies to Blizzards and Bees, Little Brown, ISBN 978-0-316-21740-8
- Lanza, Robert and Berman, Bob (2016), Beyond Biocentrism: Rethinking Time, Space, Consciousness, and the Illusion of Death, ISBN 978-1-94295-221-3
- Zapped: From Infrared to Xrays, the Curious History of Invisible Light (2017) Little Brown ISBN 978-0-316-31130-4
- Earth-Shattering: Violent Supernovas, Galactic Explosions, Biological Mayhem, Nuclear Meltdowns, and other hazards to Life in our Universe (2019) Little Brown, and Company (ISBN 978-0-316-51135-3)
- The Grand Biocentric Design: How Life Creates Reality by Robert Lanza, Matej Pavsic, Bob Berman (2020, Benbella Books, ISBN 9781950665402)
