= Matej Pavšič =

Slovenian theoretical physicist

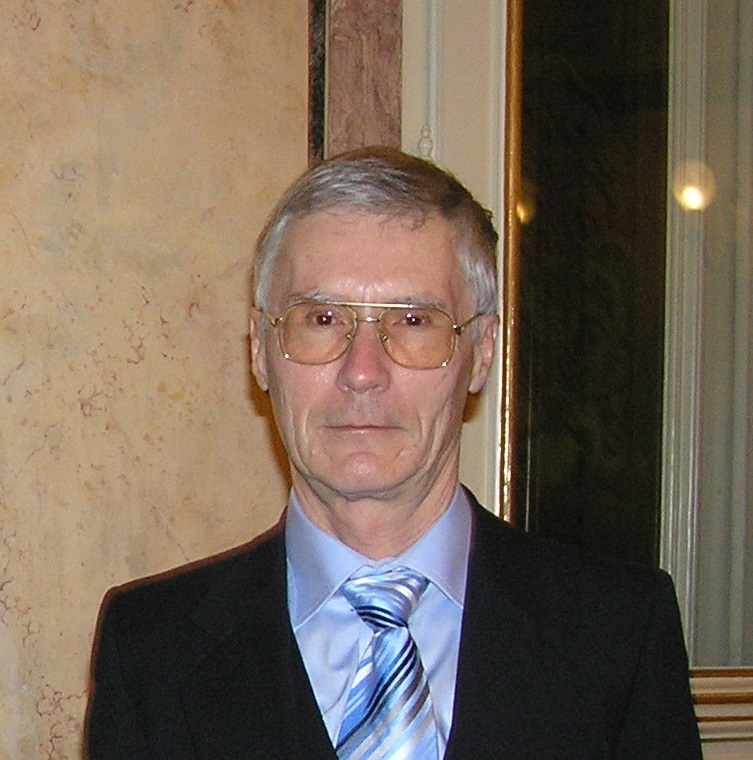
Matej Pavšič

Matej Pavšič is a Slovenian theoretical physicist. During his work at Jožef Stefan Institute he has investigated mirror particles, conformal relativity, Kaluza-Klein theories, brane world scenarios, Clifford algebras and relativity in Clifford spaces.

== Life and career ==
Matej Pavšič was born on 24 February 1946 in Ljubljana, Slovenia, then Yugoslavia. He attended the classical division of the 2nd Gymnasium of Ljubljana and studied physics at the University of Ljubljana. After graduating, he started working at Jožef Stefan Institute in Ljubljana and received his master's degree in 1975. In 1974 he received the prize of the Boris Kidrič Fund, Ljubljana. He then spent a year at the Institute of Theoretical Physics in Catania, Italy, where he worked with Erasmo Recami and Piero Caldirola. Under their supervision, he completed his doctoral thesis, which he later defended at the University of Ljubljana. He regularly visited the International Centre for Theoretical Physics (ICTP) in Trieste, where he collaborated with Asim O. Barut, mainly on a model of the spinning particle in the presence of a gravitational field, and also on charged membranes. Matej Pavšič also worked with the mathematical physicist Waldyr Rodrigues Jr. who invited him in 1993 to spend a year as a visiting professor at the Institute for Applied Mathematics (IMMEC) in Campinas, Brazil. There he studied geometric calculus based on Clifford algebras and related topics. For his work he became in 2008 a member of the advisory board of International Conferences for Clifford Algebras (ICCA) and presented an invited talk at ICCA8.

== Main contributions ==
=== Mirror particles ===
In 1974 Pavšič considered a theory according to which nature is exactly symmetric with respect to space inversion, provided that one postulates the existence of mirror particles and mirror interactions among them. The idea of mirror particles was introduced in 1956 by Lee and Yang in their paper on parity non conservation, and was in 1966 further elaborated by Yu. Kobzarev, L.B. Okun and I.Ya. Pomeranchuk within the context of a CP invariant theory. Nowadays, the so-called exact parity models are considered in many works as an explanation of dark matter.

=== Spacetime as a membrane in higher dimensions – brane world ===
Pavšič also investigated the idea that spacetime is a 4-dimensional membrane embedded in a higher dimensional space. He first explained this idea in its rough contours in 1981, and later in more elaborated works and the book.

=== Clifford algebras and Clifford spaces ===
Since 1992 Pavšič became interested in Clifford algebras as a useful tool for geometry and physics. Among other things, he showed that the geometric calculus based on Clifford algebras resolves the ordering ambiguity of operators in curved spaces. Pavšič also found that under space inversion a geometric spinor (an element of a Clifford algebra) becomes a mirror particle experiencing mirror gauge interactions.

=== Higher derivative theories and negative energies ===
Following the important insights of several authors, Pavšič has found that in the presence of physically realistic interaction potentials, bounded from below and from above, the systems with negative energies are stable. As an example, he studied the Pais-Uhlenbeck oscillator in the presence of a bounded interaction term. The Pais-Uhlenbeck oscillator is a prototype of a higher derivative theory, and the demonstration of its stability indicates that higher derivative gravity is a physically viable theory

== Books ==
- The Landscape of Theoretical Physics: A Global View; From Point Particles to the Brane World and Beyond, in Search of a Unifying Principle. Kluwer Academic, 2001.
- Stumbling Blocks Against Unification. World Scientific, 2020.
