= Nancy Kress =

American science fiction writer (born 1948)

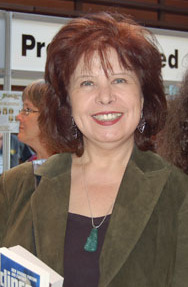
- Kress in 2007
- Born: Nancy Anne Koningisor; January 20, 1948 (age 78); Buffalo, New York, U.S.
- Education: SUNY Plattsburgh (MA)
- Occupation: Writer
- Spouses: Michael Kress (1973-1984); Marcos Donnelly (1988-1994); Charles Sheffield (1998–2002); Jack Skillingstead (2011–now)
- Writing career
- Pen name: Anna Kendall (for fantasy)
- Period: 1976–present
- Genre: Science fiction: Fantasy (as Kendall)
- Website: nancykress.com

Nancy Anne Kress (born January 20, 1948) is an American science fiction writer. She began writing in 1976 but has achieved her greatest notice since the publication of her Hugo- and Nebula-winning novella Beggars in Spain (1991), which became a novel in 1993. She also won the Nebula Award for Best Novella in 2013 for After the Fall, Before the Fall, During the Fall, recently honored as a Grand Master by the Science Fiction and Fantasy Writers Association (SFWA) and in 2015 for Yesterday's Kin. In addition to her novels, Kress has written numerous short stories and is a regular columnist for Writer's Digest. She is a regular at Clarion Workshops. During the winter of 2008/09, Nancy Kress was the Picador Guest Professor for Literature at the University of Leipzig's Institute for American Studies in Leipzig, Germany.

== Biography ==
Born Nancy Anne Koningisor in Buffalo, New York, she grew up in East Aurora and attended college at SUNY Plattsburgh and graduated with an M.A. in English. Before starting her writing career she taught elementary school and then college English. In 1973, she moved to Rochester to marry Michael Joseph Kress. They had two sons, and divorced in 1984. At that time, she went to work at Stanton and Hucko, an advertising agency. She was married to Marcos Donnelly from 1988 to 1994.

In 1998, she married fellow author Charles Sheffield, who died in 2002 of a brain tumor. Kress moved back to Rochester, New York, to be near her grown children. In 2009, she moved to Seattle. In February 2011, she married author Jack Skillingstead.

== Work ==
Kress tends to write hard science fiction, or technically realistic stories, often set in a fairly near future. Her fiction often involves genetic engineering and, to a lesser degree, artificial intelligence. There are many invented technologies shared between her stories, including "genemod", to refer to genetic engineering, and "foamcast", a lightweight and sturdy building material that appears in many of her novels and short stories.

By conducting extensive research, she keeps her topics within the realm of possibility; however, as Kress clarified for one Locus interviewer, with regards to her partner and fellow science fiction writer, "[Sheffield] pronounces it science fiction, and I pronounce it science fiction."

Kress also loves ballet, and has written stories around it.

== Awards ==
- Nebula Award
  - Best Short Story winner (1986): "Out of All Them Bright Stars", F&SF March 1985
  - Best Novella (1991): Beggars in Spain (Axolotl Press / Pulphouse Feb. 1991) / Asimov's April 1991
  - Best Novelette (1998): "The Flowers of Aulit Prison", Asimov's Oct./Nov. 1996
  - Best Novella (2007): "Fountain of Age", Asimov's July 2007
  - Best Novella (2012): "After the Fall, Before the Fall, During the Fall", Tachyon Publications
  - Best Novella (2014): "Yesterday's Kin", Tachyon Publications
- Hugo Award
  - Best Novella (1992): Beggars in Spain (Axolotl Press / Pulphouse Feb. 1991) / Asimov's April 1991
  - Best Novella (2009): "The Erdmann Nexus", Asimov's Oct./Nov. 2008
- John W. Campbell Memorial Award
  - Best Novel (2003): Probability Space, (Tor Sep. 2002)
- Theodore Sturgeon Award
  - Best Short Science Fiction (1997): "The Flowers of Aulit Prison", Asimov's Oct./Nov. 1996
