= NESFA Press =

American science fiction book publisher, Framingham, MA, US (first book 1971)

- Parent company: New England Science Fiction Association
- Country of origin: United States
- Headquarters location: Somerville, Massachusetts
- Publication types: Books
- Nonfiction topics: Reference
- Fiction genres: science fiction
- Official website: www.nesfapress.org

NESFA Press is the publishing arm of the New England Science Fiction Association, Inc. The NESFA Press primarily produces three types of books:

- Books honoring the guest(s) of honor at their annual convention, Boskone, and at some Worldcons and other conventions.
- Books in the NESFA's Choice series, which includes the works of deserving classic SF writers such as Lois McMaster Bujold, Roger Zelazny, Cordwainer Smith, C. M. Kornbluth, and Zenna Henderson.
- Reference books on science fiction and science fiction fandom.

== Works published by NESFA Press ==
This is a reverse chronological list of books published by NESFA Press.

=== 2020s ===
==== 2026 ====
- Dubious Pleasures by Greg Cox

==== 2025 ====
- Wolf's Perils by Kelley Armstrong

==== 2023 ====
- Living in the Future by Robert Silverberg

==== 2020 ====
- Stan's Kitchen by Kim Stanley Robinson
- Believing by Zenna Henderson

=== 2010s ===
==== 2019 ====
- On the Road with Gardner Dozois by Gardner Dozois
- Ingathering by Zenna Henderson
- Transfinite by A. E. van Vogt
- The Immortal Storm by Sam Moskowitz

==== 2018 ====
- Making Conversation by Teresa Nielsen Hayden
- Making Book by Teresa Nielsen Hayden

==== 2017 ====
- The Halcyon Fairy Book by T. Kingfisher
- A Lit Fuse: The Provocative Life of Harlan Ellison by Nat Segaloff
- Question and Answer by Poul Anderson

==== 2016 ====
- The Grimm Future edited by Erin Underwood
- Call Me Joe by Poul Anderson
- Conspiracy! ed. by Thomas A. Easton & Judith Klein-Dial

==== 2014 ====
- A Bicycle Built for Brew by Poul Anderson

==== 2013 ====
- Door to Anywhere by Poul Anderson

==== 2012 ====
- 24 Frames into the Future: Scalzi on Science Fiction Films by John Scalzi
- Barrayar by Lois McMaster Bujold

==== 2011 ====
- Lifelode by Jo Walton
- Scratch Monkey by Charles Stross
- Admiralty, by Poul Anderson

==== 2010 ====
- Deep Navigation by Alastair Reynolds
- The Vor Game, by Lois McMaster Bujold
- Robots and Magic, by Lester del Rey
- The Saturn Game, by Poul Anderson
- The Ides of Octember: A Pictorial Bibliography of Roger Zelazny, by Christopher S. Kovacs

=== 2000s ===
==== 2009 ====
- The Collected Stories of Roger Zelazny, Vol. 5: Nine Black Doves, by Roger Zelazny
- The Collected Stories of Roger Zelazny, Vol. 6: The Road to Amber by Roger Zelazny
- The Flight of Eagles by James Blish
- War and Space, by Lester del Rey
- The Queen of Air and Darkness, by Poul Anderson
- Magic Mirrors, by John Bellairs
- The Collected Stories of Roger Zelazny, Vol. 3: This Mortal Mountain by Roger Zelazny
- The Collected Stories of Roger Zelazny, Vol. 4: Last Exit to Babylon by Roger Zelazny
- Lifelode, by Jo Walton
- Sibyls and Spaceships, by Jo Walton
- The Collected Stories of Roger Zelazny, Vol. 1: Threshold by Roger Zelazny
- The Collected Stories of Roger Zelazny, Vol. 2: Power & Light by Roger Zelazny
- Call Me Joe, by Poul Anderson

==== 2008 ====
- Brothers in Arms, by Lois McMaster Bujold
- Spaced Out (omnibus), by Judith Merril & C.M. Kornbluth
- The One Right Thing, by Bruce Coville
- Works of Art, by James Blish
- From Other Shores, by Chad Oliver

==== 2007 ====
- Borders of Infinity, by Lois McMaster Bujold
- The Involuntary Human, by David Gerrold
- The Mathematics of Magic: The Enchanter Stories of L. Sprague de Camp and Fletcher Pratt, by L. Sprague de Camp and Fletcher Pratt

==== 2006 ====
- Giant Lizards from Another Star, by Ken MacLeod

==== 2005 ====
- The Masque of Mañana, by Robert Sheckley
- Once Upon a Time (She Said), by Jane Yolen
- Years in the Making: the Time-Travel Stories of L. Sprague de Camp, by L. Sprague de Camp
- Homecalling and Other Stories, by Judith Merril

==== 2004 ====
- All Our Yesterdays, by Harry Warner, Jr.
- Dancing Naked: The Unexpurgated William Tenn, by William Tenn
- Falling Free, by Lois McMaster Bujold
- With Stars in My Eyes: My Adventures in British Fandom, by Peter Weston
- Fancestral Voices, by Jack Speer
- Once More* With Footnotes, by Terry Pratchett
- "Doc"—First Galactic Roamer: A complete Bibliography and Publishing Checklist of Book and Articles by and About E. E. "Doc" Smith, by Stephen C. Lucchetti
- The Hunters of Pangaea, by Stephen Baxter
- Powers of Two, by Tim Powers
- Silverlock: Including the Silverlock Companion, by John Myers Myers (1949) and Fred Lerner, ed. (1988) OCLC 54884542

==== 2003 ====
- Ethan of Athos, by Lois McMaster Bujold
- Rivets!!! The Science Fiction Musicals of Mark Keller and Sue Anderson, by Mark Keller & Sue Anderson
- A Star Above It and Other Stories, by Chad Oliver
- Far From This Earth and Other Stories, by Chad Oliver
- Transfinite: The Essential A. E. van Vogt, by A. E. van Vogt
- Tomorrow Happens, by David Brin
- A New Dawn, the Don A. Stuart Stories of John W. Campbell, Jr., by John W. Campbell, Jr.

==== 2002 ====
- Martians and Madness: The SF Novels of Fredric Brown, by Fredric Brown
- Cybele, with Bluebonnets, by Charles L. Harness
- The Warrior's Apprentice, by Lois McMaster Bujold
- Expecting Beowulf, by Tom Holt
- Adventures in The Dream Trade, by Neil Gaiman
- Dimensions of Sheckley, by Robert Sheckley

==== 2001 ====
- Robert Silverberg Presents the Great SF (1964) selected by Robert Silverberg & Martin H. Greenberg
- Entities, by Eric Frank Russell
- Strange Days: Fabulous Journeys with Gardner Dozois, by Gardner R. Dozois
- Here Comes Civilization: The Complete Science Fiction of William Tenn, Volume 2, by William Tenn
- From These Ashes: The Short Science Fiction of Fredric Brown, by Fredric Brown
- Immodest Proposals: The Complete Science Fiction of William Tenn, Volume 1, by William Tenn
- Quartet, by George R. R. Martin

==== 2000 ====
- The Essential Hal Clement, Volume 3: Variations on a Theme by Sir Isaac Newton. The Mesklin Writings of Hal Clement, by Hal Clement
- Major Ingredients, by Eric Frank Russell
- Concordance to Cordwainer Smith, Anthony R. Lewis
- Shards of Honor, by Lois McMaster Bujold
- The Essential Hal Clement, Volume 2: Music of Many Spheres. Selected Short Fiction of Hal Clement, by Hal Clement
- Moon Dogs, by Michael Swanwick

=== 1990s ===
==== 1999 ====
- Rings, by Charles Harness
- Another Part of the Trilogy, a libretto by John M. Ford
- The Essential Hal Clement, Volume 1: Trio for Slide Rule and Typewriter. Three Science Fiction Novels of Hal Clement, by Hal Clement
- Double Feature, Emma Bull and Will Shetterly
- The Compleat Boucher: The Science Fiction of Anthony Boucher, by Anthony Boucher

==== 1998 ====
- First Contacts: The Essential Murray Leinster, by Murray Leinster
- The Work of Jack Williamson: An Annotated Bibliography and Guide, by Richard Hauptmann
- An Ornament to His Profession, by Charles L. Harness
- Frankensteins and Foreign Devils, by Walter Jon Williams

==== 1997 ====
- The Armor of Light, by Melissa Scott & Lisa A. Barnett
- Entertainment, by Algis Budrys
- From the End of The Twentieth Century, by John M. Ford
- His Share of Glory: The Complete Short Science Fiction of C. M. Kornbluth, by C. M. Kornbluth

==== 1996 ====
- The White Papers, by James White
- The Silence of The Langford, by Dave Langford
- Dreamweaver's Dilemma, by Lois McMaster Bujold

==== 1995 ====
- Ingathering: The Complete People Stories, by Zenna Henderson
- Everard's Ride, by Diana Wynne Jones
- Andre Norton, A Primary and Secondary Bibliography, 2nd Revised Edition, by Roger C. Schlobin & Irene R. Harrison
- A Bookman's Fantasy: How Science Fiction Became Respectable, and Other Essays, by Fred Lerner
- Norstrilia, by Cordwainer Smith

==== 1994 ====
- The Passage of The Light: The Recursive Science Fiction of Barry N. Malzberg, by Barry N. Malzberg
- Making Book, by Teresa Nielsen Hayden
- Double Feature, by Will Shetterly & Emma Bull

==== 1993 ====
- The Rediscovery of Man: The Complete Short Science Fiction of Cordwainer Smith by Cordwainer Smith
- Vietnam and Other Alien Worlds, by Joe Haldeman

==== 1992 ====
- Storyteller, by Jane Yolen
- Let's Hear it for the Deaf Man, by Dave Langford

==== 1991 ====
- The Best of James H. Schmitz, by James H. Schmitz
- Stalking the Wild Resnick, by Mike Resnick

==== 1990 ====
- An Annotated Bibliography of Recursive Science Fiction, by Anthony R. Lewis
- Sung in Blood, by Glen Cook

=== 1980s ===
==== 1989 ====
- Grand Masters' Choice, edited by Andre Norton & Ingrid Zierhut
- An Epitaph in Rust, by Tim Powers

==== 1988 ====
- Up There and Other Strange Directions, by Donald A. Wollheim
- Early Harvest, by Greg Bear

==== 1987 ====
- The NESFA Hymnal, Volume 2
- If I Ran the ~~Zoo~~ Con... (2nd edition), by Leslie J. Turek
- Intuit, by Hal Clement
- Glass and Amber, by C. J. Cherryh

==== 1986 ====
- Between Two Worlds, by Terry Carr & Messages Found in an Oxygen Bottle, by Bob Shaw
- Out of My Head, by Robert Bloch

==== 1985 ====
- Light from a Lone Star, by Jack Vance
- Late Knight Edition, by Damon Knight

==== 1984 ====
- Concordance to Cordwainer Smith, by Anthony R. Lewis
- Dickson!, by Gordon R. Dickson
- Plan[e]t Engineering, by Gene Wolfe

==== 1983 ====
- A New Settlement of Old Scores, by John Brunner
- Compounded Interests, by Mack Reynolds

==== 1982 ====
- Up to the Sky in Ships, by A. Bertram Chandler & In and Out of Quandry, by Lee Hoffman
- The Men from Ariel, by Donald A. Wollheim

==== 1981 ====
- Unsilent Night, by Tanith Lee

=== 1970s ===
==== 1979 ====
- The NESFA Hymnal

==== 1978 ====
- Tomorrow May Be Even Worse, by John Brunner

==== 1977 ====
- Viewpoint, by Ben Bova

==== 1976 ====
- Homebrew, by Poul Anderson

==== 1975 ====
- A Time When, by Anne McCaffrey

==== 1974 ====
- Have You Seen These?, by Isaac Asimov

==== 1973 ====
- Three Faces of Science Fiction, by Robert A.W. Lowndes

==== 1972 ====
- Scribblings, by L. Sprague de Camp

==== 1971 ====
- Index to the Science Fiction Magazines 1966-1970, by Anthony Lewis

== Authors published by NESFA Press ==
- Poul Anderson
- Kelley Armstrong
- Isaac Asimov
- Melissa Scott & Lisa A. Barnett
- Stephen Baxter
- Greg Bear
- John Bellairs
- Robert Bloch
- Anthony Boucher
- Ben Bova
- David Brin
- Fredric Brown
- John Brunner
- Algis Budrys
- Lois McMaster Bujold
- Emma Bull & Will Shetterly
- John W. Campbell, Jr.
- Terry Carr & Bob Shaw
- A. Bertram Chandler & Lee Hoffman
- C. J. Cherryh
- Hal Clement
- Glen Cook
- L. Sprague de Camp
- Gordon R. Dickson
- Gardner R. Dozois
- John M. Ford
- Neil Gaiman
- David Gerrold
- Joe Haldeman
- Charles L. Harness
- Zenna Henderson
- Lee Hoffman & A. Bertram Chandler
- Tom Holt
- Diana Wynne Jones
- Damon Knight
- C. M. Kornbluth
- Dave Langford
- Tanith Lee
- Murray Leinster
- Fred Lerner
- Robert A. W. Lowndes
- Stephen C. Lucchetti
- Ken MacLeod
- Barry N. Malzberg
- George R. R. Martin
- Anne McCaffrey
- Judith Merril
- John Myers Myers
- Teresa Nielsen Hayden
- Andre Norton & Ingrid T. Zierhut
- Chad Oliver
- Tim Powers
- Terry Pratchett
- Fletcher Pratt
- Mike Resnick
- Mack Reynolds
- Eric Frank Russell
- James H. Schmitz
- Robert Sheckley
- Robert Silverberg
- Cordwainer Smith
- Jack Speer
- Michael Swanwick
- William Tenn
- A. E. van Vogt
- Jack Vance
- Harry Warner, Jr.
- Peter Weston
- James White
- Walter Jon Williams
- Gene Wolfe
- Donald A. Wollheim
- Jane Yolen
