= 1993 in science fiction =

The year 1993 was marked, in science fiction, by the following:

== Events ==
- The 51st annual Worldcon, ConFrancisco, was held in San Francisco, USA

== Births and deaths ==
=== Deaths ===
- Anthony Burgess
- Ishiro Honda
- Sun Ra

== Literary releases ==
=== Novels ===
- Green Mars, by Kim Stanley Robinson
- Paprika, by Yasutaka Tsutsui
- Parable of the Sower, by Octavia E. Butler

=== Children's books ===
- The Giver, by Lois Lowry

== Movies ==
- Demolition Man, dir. by Marco Brambilla
- Jurassic Park, directed by Steven Spielberg

== Television ==
- Babylon 5
- Star Trek: Deep Space Nine
- The X-Files

== Video games ==
- Day of the Tentacle
- Sim City 2000

== Awards ==
=== Hugos ===
- Best novel: A Fire Upon the Deep, by Vernor Vinge and Doomsday Book, by Connie Willis (tie)
- Best novella: Barnacle Bill the Spacer, by Lucius Shepard
- Best novelette: "The Nutcracker Coup", by Janet Kagan
- Best short story: "Even the Queen", by Connie Willis
- Best related work: A Wealth of Fable, by Harry Warner Jr.
- Best dramatic presentation: Star Trek: The Next Generation — " The Inner Light", dir. by Peter Lauritson; Teleplay by Morgan Gendel and Peter Allan Fields; story by Morgan Gendel
- Best professional editor: Gardner Dozois
- Best professional artist: Don Maitz
- Best original artwork: Dinotopia, by James Gurney
- Best semiprozine: Science Fiction Chronicle, ed. by Andrew I. Porter
- Best fanzine: Mimosa, ed. by Dick Lynch and Nicki Lynch
- Best fan writer: Dan Langford
- Best fan artist: Peggy Ranson

=== Nebulas ===
- Best novel: Red Mars, by Kim Stanley Robinson
- Best novella: The Night We Buried Road Dog, by Jack Cady
- Best novelette: " Georgia on My Mind", by Charles Sheffield
- Best short story: "Graves", by Joe Haldeman

=== Other awards ===
- BSFA Award for Best Novel: Aztec Century, by Christopher Evans
- Locus Award for Best Science Fiction Novel: Doomsday Book by Connie Willis
- Saturn Award for Best Science Fiction Film: Jurassic Park
