= Charles Locke =

Charles Locke may refer to:

- Charles Holland Locke, Canadian judge
- Charles Herbert Locke, Australian company director
- Charles O. Locke (1896–1977), author of The Hell Bent Kid and other works

== See also ==
- Charlie Locke, owner of Lake Louise Mountain Resort
- Charles Lock, British consul-general in Naples and Egypt
