= Ingathering: The Complete People Stories =

1995 science fiction story collection by American Zenna Henderson

- First edition
- Author: Zenna Henderson
- Cover artist: Elizabeth Rhys Finney
- Language: English
- Genre: Science fiction
- Publisher: NESFA Press
- Publication date: March 1995
- Publication place: United States
- Pages: 577 (hardback)
- ISBN: 0-915368-58-7
- OCLC: 32812145
- Dewey Decimal: 813/.54
- LC Class: 94-074598

Ingathering: The Complete People Stories, also known as Ingathering: The Complete People Stories of Zenna Henderson, is a 1995 collection of science fiction stories by American science fiction and fantasy author Zenna Henderson. It was edited by Mark L. Olson and Priscilla Olson and published in Massachusetts by the New England Science Fiction Association's NESFA Press as part of their "Choice series". The book contains all seventeen stories Henderson wrote about the People, a group of benevolent human aliens stranded on Earth and struggling to fit in.

The People stories were originally published in The Magazine of Fantasy & Science Fiction between 1952 and 1980, and novelized, with bridging narratives by Henderson, in two collections: Pilgrimage: The Book of the People (1961) and The People: No Different Flesh (1966). Ingathering includes the 1961 and 1966 collections, four additional People stories published after the aforementioned collections, and a previously unpublished story, "Michal Without". Ingathering also contains an essay on the People series by Henderson, originally published in The Great Science Fiction Series (1980), plus an introduction to the collection by Priscilla Olson and a People stories chronology by Mark and Priscilla Olson.

Ingathering was generally well received by critics. It was a second place finalist in the 1996 Locus Award for Best Collection, and was included in David Brin's "Science Fiction for Young Adults: A Recommended List". Henderson's 1958 novella "Captivity" was a finalist for the 1959 Hugo Award for Best Novelette, (Note: Even though "Captivity" is a novella, it was nominated for the 1959 Hugo Award for Best Novelette, as no award for Best Novella existed until 1968.) and her 1955 novelette "Pottage" was loosely adapted into a 1972 television film, The People.

== Contents ==
All titles were written by Zenna Henderson, except "Introduction" by Priscilla Olson, and "Chronology of the People Stories" by Mark L. Olson and Priscilla Olson.

- Titles 1–12 were previously collected in Pilgrimage: The Book of the People (1961)
- Titles 13–23 were previously collected in The People: No Different Flesh (1967)
- Title 26 was previously unpublished

Title	Type	First published
0. "Introduction"	Essay	This collection
1. "Lea 1"	Bridging narrative	Pilgrimage: The Book of the People (1961)
2. "Ararat"	Novelette	The Magazine of Fantasy & Science Fiction (October 1952)
3. "Lea 2"	Bridging narrative	Pilgrimage: The Book of the People (1961)
4. "Gilead"	Novelette	The Magazine of Fantasy & Science Fiction (August 1954)
5. "Lea 3"	Bridging narrative	Pilgrimage: The Book of the People (1961)
6. "Pottage"	Novelette	The Magazine of Fantasy & Science Fiction (September 1955)
7. "Lea 4"	Bridging narrative	Pilgrimage: The Book of the People (1961)
8. "Wilderness"	Novelette	The Magazine of Fantasy & Science Fiction (January 1957)
9. "Lea 5"	Bridging narrative	Pilgrimage: The Book of the People (1961)
10. "Captivity"	Novella	The Magazine of Fantasy & Science Fiction (June 1958)
11. "Lea 6"	Bridging narrative	Pilgrimage: The Book of the People (1961)
12. "Jordan"	Novelette	The Magazine of Fantasy & Science Fiction (March 1959)
13. "No Different Flesh"	Novelette	The Magazine of Fantasy & Science Fiction (May 1965)
14. "Mark & Meris 1"	Bridging narrative	The People: No Different Flesh (1967)
15. "Deluge"	Novelette	The Magazine of Fantasy & Science Fiction (October 1963)
16. "Mark & Meris 2"	Bridging narrative	The People: No Different Flesh (1967)
17. "Angels Unawares"	Novelette	The Magazine of Fantasy & Science Fiction (March 1966)
18. "Mark & Meris 3"	Bridging narrative	The People: No Different Flesh (1967)
19. "Troubling of the Water"	Novelette	The Magazine of Fantasy & Science Fiction (September 1966)
20. "Mark & Meris 4"	Bridging narrative	The People: No Different Flesh (1967)
21. "Return"	Novelette	The Magazine of Fantasy & Science Fiction (March 1961)
22. "Mark & Meris 5"	Bridging narrative	The People: No Different Flesh (1967)
23. "Shadow on the Moon"	Novelette	The Magazine of Fantasy & Science Fiction (March 1962)
24. "Tell Us a Story"	Novella	The Magazine of Fantasy & Science Fiction (October 1980)
25. "That Boy"	Novelette	The Magazine of Fantasy & Science Fiction (November 1971)
26. "Michal Without"	Novelette	This collection
27. "The Indelible Kind"	Novelette	The Magazine of Fantasy & Science Fiction (December 1968)
28. "Katie-Mary's Trip"	Short story	The Magazine of Fantasy & Science Fiction (January 1975)
29. "The People Series"	Essay	The Great Science Fiction Series ed. Olander, Greenberg, Pohl (November 1980)
30. "Chronology of the People Stories"	Essay	This collection

Source: Internet Speculative Fiction Database

== The People ==
Henderson's People are a group of benevolent human aliens stranded on Earth after fleeing their doomed homeworld. Their ship broke up in the Earth's atmosphere and the survivors crash-landed in escape pods, scattering them across rural southwestern United States, where the author lived and worked as a teacher. They have psionic abilities, including levitation, telepathy, telekinesis, and healing. The People stories take place in the late 19th and early 20th centuries and are about these refugees trying to find each other and struggling to blend in with the local population who see them as being different. Henderson's entry in The Encyclopedia of Science Fiction states that the People's special abilities and moral superiority forces them to live as a wainscot society.

In her essay "The People Series", included in this collection and originally published in 1980 in The Great Science Fiction Series, an anthology edited by Joseph Olander, Martin H. Greenberg and Frederik Pohl, Henderson wrote that her People began as "a weird group [of] refugees from a Transylvania-type country" who had used magic to cross the Atlantic Ocean. But when she found these people too "unpleasant" to write about, she made them benign aliens from another planet. Henderson said, "I think one of the appeals of the People is that they are a possible forgotten side of the coin that seems always to flip to evil, violence, and cruelty."

== Critical reception ==
In a review of Ingathering at Tor.com, Welsh-Canadian fantasy and science fiction writer Jo Walton recalled the effect reading these stories had on her as a youngster. "[T]hey're the most comforting thing any lonely misunderstood teenager could possibly wish for. They’re about being special and finding other special people." Walton noted that in retrospect the stories are "definitely very old-fashioned" and could even become "a little bor[ing]", but went on to say that "I do like them, even now." She added: "The stories are filled with deep religious sensibility, a profound sense of joy ... [t]hey're beautifully written and very sweet".

Writing in Booklist, Sally Estes also felt the stories may appear dated and "mawkish", but added that they have not lost their "emotional power", which she attributes to Henderson's "masterfully lucid prose". Estes concluded that these are important science fiction stories because of their approach to the paranormal. Science fiction critic Tom Easton concurred that these stories deserve a place in the history of science fiction. Easton wrote in Analog Science Fiction and Fact that Henderson reminded him of Clifford Simak, whose works have a similar "charming flavor and ability to influence others". Sybil Steinberg stated in Publishers Weekly that in Ingathering "Henderson provides a warm, emotional voice, pre-feminist yet independent, examining issues of identity, loneliness, nostalgia and caring." Steinberg wrote that despite the stories appearing "too sentimental" to some, "their emotional integrity and deeply moral core will ... please many."

In a review of the collection in Locus, Shira Daemon also recalled reading these stories as an adolescent and noted the impact they had on youngsters struggling to fit in during the 1950s and 60s. She described the People stories as "sweet and lovely little gems", but added that reading all of them at once can overwhelm the reader with a "sugar shock" resulting from the stories' pervading "goodness", and suggested they be read a few at a time. Daemon went on the say that while the plots do tend to become a little repetitive after a while, Henderson's "expressive writing" makes each story engaging on its own. Daemon complimented NESFA Press in rescuing these stories that would otherwise have disappeared in "shrinking backlists".

Reviewing the book in the Washington Science Fiction Association journal, Samuel Lubell said the success of these stories is Henderson's ability to merge the "ordinary with the extraordinary". He felt that the stories from Pilgrimage, in particular "Ararat", are the strongest, whereas "Katie-Mary's Trip", "an attempt to bring The People into the [19]60s", deviates from the author's "normal, plain style" and is the only story that "does not work". Lubell concluded:

If you ever thought you were different from everyone else ... if you ever wondered what it would be like to have special powers; if you ever wanted a family that understood you and accepted you ... then you owe it to yourself to discover The People through Ingathering. I cannot rate it highly enough.

== Works cited ==
- Henderson, Zenna (1995). Ingathering: The Complete People Stories. Framingham, Massachusetts: NESFA Press. ISBN 0-915368-58-7.
