= Julie Carpenter =

American Researcher, Educator, Author, Speaker, Human-Robot Interaction Specialist

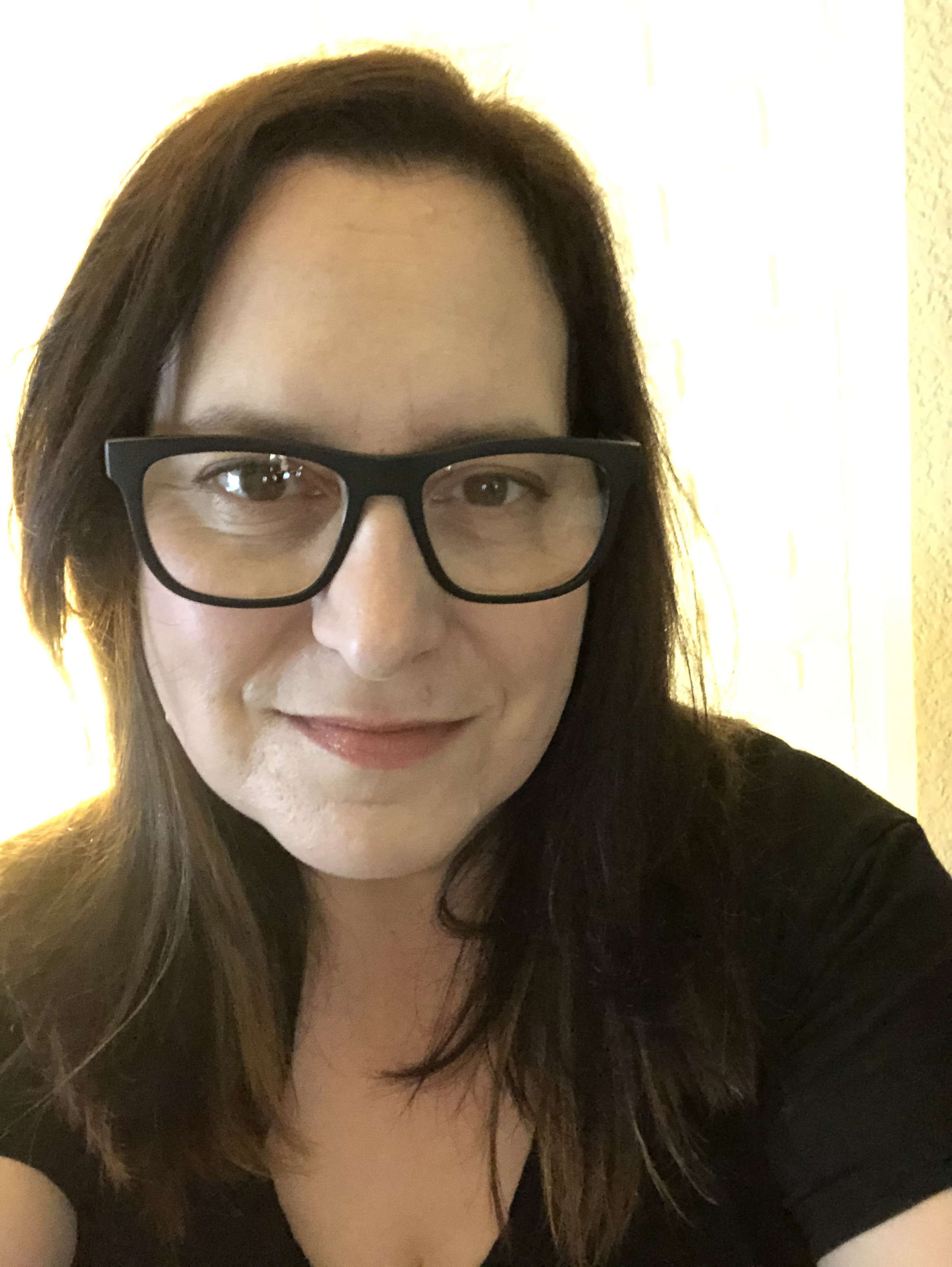
- Born: Julie Gwyn Wajdyk; Madison, WI, US
- Known for: Q (nonbinary voice), AI ethics, soldier social relationships with robots, human sexuality and robots
- Scientific career
- Institutions: University of Washington-Seattle; Rensselaer Polytechnic Institute; University of Wisconsin-Madison
- Website: www.jgcarpenter.com

Julie Carpenter, born Julie Gwyn Wajdyk, is an American researcher whose work focuses on human behavior with emerging technologies, especially within vulnerable and marginalized populations. She is best known for her work in human attachment to robots and other forms of artificial intelligence.

== Education ==
Carpenter has a Ph.D. in Learning Sciences from the University of Washington, an M.S. in Technical Communication/Human-Computer Interaction from Rensselaer Polytechnic Institute, a second M.S. from the Technical Communication (now Human-Centered Design and Engineering) program at the University of Washington, and a B.A. in Communication Arts (Film, Radio, and Television Theory) from the University of Wisconsin-Madison.

== Work ==
Her 2016 book Culture and Human-Robot Interaction in Militarized Spaces: A War Story explores the social role of robots in the military, specifically experiences reported by Explosive Ordinance Disposal personnel and their social interactions with robots they use in their work. More recently, the 2025 book The Naked Android: Synthetic Socialness and the Human Gaze discusses the connection among how peoples' expectations and perceptions robots are based on cultural interpretations of artificial versus human intelligence and what problems a person believes should or should not be addressed by artificial entities.

Carpenter examines human sexuality and robotic systems in Sex Robots: Social and ethical implications. In her chapter "Deux sex machina: Loving robot sex workers and the allure of an insincere kiss", she proposes incorporating a temporal component to Mori's Uncanny Valley hypothesis to account for individual changes in feelings of familiarity after repeated exposure to humanoid robots, as well as larger cultural shifts of acceptance toward humanoid robots over time.

Carpenter has said in interviews that she has been influenced by the robot designs of David Hanson and the science fiction writing of Zenna Henderson and Philip K. Dick.

Her work also includes acting as a volunteer research consultant to collaborate with VICE and VIRTUE Nordic on Q, the world's first nonbinary human voice for use with technology. In 2019, Q won the Glass Lion for Change and three bronze Lions in audio categories at Cannes. She also gave a 2016 TEDx talk in Odense, Denmark, Humans + Robots: Dream Machines.

Carpenter made the 100 Brilliant Women in AI Ethics List in 2019 and 2020 and was part of the Women in AI Ethics Council, 2020 spearheading Roles & Rights dimension of WAIE Ethical Framework.

== Publications ==
=== Books ===
- The Naked Android: Synthetic Socialness and the Human Gaze (2025). UK: CRC Press/Routledge
- Culture and Human-Robot Interaction in Militarized Spaces: A War Story, author, 2016. UK: Routledge/Taylor & Francis
- Deus Sex Machina: Loving Robot Sex Workers and the Allure of an Insincere Kiss, 2017. In J. Danaher and N. MacArthur (Eds.), Sex Robots: Social, Ethical, and Legal Implications. MIT Press: Cambridge, MA
- Kill Switch: The Evolution of Road Rage in an Increasingly AI Car Culture, 2020. In E. DeVisser, R. Pak, and E. Rovira (Eds.), Living with robots: Emerging issues on the psychological and social implications of robotics. Amsterdam: Elsevier
- Robots as Solace and the Valence of Loneliness, 2021. In Aifric Campbell (Ed.), The Love Makers. UK: Goldsmiths Press
- A Solitary Thing: Emotional Intimacy and the Idea of Cheating in Committed Human-Human Relationships with a Robot, In press, expected 2022. In Jordi Vallverdú (Ed.), Gender in AI and Robotics: The Gender Challenges from an Interdisciplinary Perspective. UAB, Ed. Switzerland: Springer

=== Selected publications ===
- Why Project Q is more than the world's first nonbinary voice for technology, author, 2019
- Gender Representation and Humanoid Robots Designed for Domestic Use, co-author, 2009
