= Silverlock (disambiguation) =

Silverlock may refer to:

- Silverlock, a novel by John Myers Myers
- Silverlock (software), password management utility software
- Wikipedia:SILVERLOCK
