= Mirror Dance =

1994 novel by Lois McMaster Bujold

- Cover from Baen first edition March 1994
- Author: Lois McMaster Bujold
- Audio read by: Grover Gardner
- Cover artist: Gary Ruddell
- Language: English
- Series: Vorkosigan Saga
- Genre: Science fiction
- Publisher: Baen Books
- Publication date: 1994
- Publication place: United States
- Pages: 392
- Awards: Locus Award for Best Science Fiction Novel (1995)
- ISBN: 978-0-671-72210-4
- Preceded by: Barrayar
- Followed by: Cetaganda

Mirror Dance is a Hugo- and Locus-award-winning science fiction novel by Lois McMaster Bujold. Part of the Vorkosigan Saga, it was first published by Baen Books in March 1994, and is included in the 2002 omnibus Miles Errant.

== Plot summary ==
Mark, Miles Vorkosigan's clone, masquerades as him and hijacks a part of his mercenary force, the Dendarii, to try to free about 50 clones on Jackson's Whole, an anything-goes freebooters' planet where Mark was created and raised. These teenage clones are scheduled to have their brains replaced by those of their wealthy, aged progenitors. When Miles finds out, he attempts to rescue his troops and his brother from the mess Mark has made, but is killed by a needle grenade. He is frozen in a cryonic chamber on the spot, but the medic in charge becomes separated from the rest of the men while retreating under fire. The medic uses an automated shipping system to send the chamber to safety, but is killed before he can tell anyone what he did and where he sent it.

The Dendarii flee the debacle and take Mark to Miles' parents on Barrayar. Cordelia accepts him as a son and has him acknowledged legally as a member of the family. After a while, Mark becomes frustrated by Barrayaran Imperial Security's lack of progress; he is convinced that Miles is still on Jackson's Whole and decides to search there himself. Cordelia helps by buying him a starship. He invites some of the Dendarii along, including Captain Quinn, Miles' second-in-command and lover.

Meanwhile, Miles has been secretly received and resuscitated by the Duronas, a research group cloned from a medical genius and employed by Jackson's Whole magnate Baron Fell. They hope they have Miles (rather than Mark) under their care, but he is suffering from normal, hopefully temporary, post-revival amnesia, so they are unsure. The Duronas wish to hire the Dendarii, who are known for pulling off difficult extractions, to help them escape from Jackson's Whole. Miles' memory takes some time to return.

Mark finds Miles, but is captured by Miles' old nemesis, Baron Ryoval, and tortured for five days. His personality fragments into four sub-personalities: Gorge the glutton, Grunt the sex pervert, Howl the masochist, and Killer the assassin. Together, the first three protect Mark's fragile persona, while Killer bides his time. When Ryoval's assistant informs him that Mark seems to have adjusted remarkably quickly and is actually enjoying the torture, a frustrated Ryoval decides to study his victim alone. Killer takes the opportunity to kill Ryoval, enabling Mark to escape. Mark sells Ryoval's security access codes to Baron Fell for a large sum of money and the Durona Group's freedom.

Miles' short death and revivification have serious repercussions for his health. Mark has his own problems, thanks to his strange upbringing, complicated by the torture. When he asks his mother for help, she sends him to Beta Colony for psychiatric treatment and therapy.

By necessity, this novel is told from the viewpoints of Miles and Mark. This was the first novel in the Vorkosigan series to be written this way, though not the first time Bujold has employed this style; the first occasion was in Falling Free.

== Awards ==
Mirror Dance won both the Hugo Award for Best Novel and the Locus Award for Best Science Fiction Novel in 1995.
