= Rubber Dinosaurs and Wooden Elephants =

1996 essay collection by L. Sprague de Camp

Rubber Dinosaurs and Wooden Elephants: Essays on Literature, Film, and History
- Dust-jacket for Rubber Dinosaurs and Wooden Elephants: Essays on Literature, Film, and History
- Author: L. Sprague de Camp
- Language: English
- Subject: Essays
- Publisher: Borgo Press
- Publication date: 1996
- Publication place: United States
- Media type: Print (Hardback)
- Pages: 143 pp
- ISBN: 0-89370-354-0
- OCLC: 32203134
- Dewey Decimal: 809.3/8766 20
- LC Class: PN3435 .D4 1996

Rubber Dinosaurs and Wooden Elephants: Essays on Literature, Film, and History is a 1996 essay collection by L. Sprague de Camp, published in hardcover by Borgo Press as no. 26 in the series I.O. Evans Studies in the Philosophy & Criticism of Literature. The title essay "Rubber Dinosaurs and Wooden Elephants" (retitled in this collection) was originally published in the magazine Analog Science Fiction and Fact, in the issue for mid-December 1987.

== Summary ==
The book consists of thirteen pieces on various subjects, including writers H. P. Lovecraft (two essays), Robert E. Howard (also two essays), and Edgar Rice Burroughs, actor Douglas Fairbanks, Sr., silent movies, pseudohistory, pseudobibliographica, barbarians real and fictional, the Scopes Trial, the ancient tyrant Dionysius I of Syracuse, and the author himself.

== Contents ==
- "Silent Specters, Spiders, and Sauropods" (from Starlog, iss. 109, Aug. 1986)
- "The Con Man from Baghdad" (originally titled "Rubber Dinosaurs and Wooden Elephants) (from Analog Science Fiction and Fact, mid-Dec. 1987)
- "Three Thirds of a Hero" (poem, from Scribblings (1972)
- "Lovecraft: Failed Aristocrat" (from The Magazine of Fantasy & Science Fiction, Jan. 1975)
- "Conan, Illusion, and Reality" (from Ares, no. 2, May 1980)
- "Thoats, Tharks, and Thews" (from Starlog, v. 10, iss. 117, Apr. 1987)
- "Pseudohistory" (from Amra, v. 2, no. 70, Sep. 1981)
- "Books That Never Were" (from Scribblings (1972) and The Magazine of Fantasy & Science Fiction, Dec. 1972)
- "The Man who Invented R. and D."
- "Brachiating in the Family Tree" (from The Humanist, v. 49, iss. 2, Mar./Apr. 1989)
- "Lovecraft and the Aryans" (from Blond Barbarians and Noble Savages (1975)
- "Howard and the Celts " (from Blond Barbarians and Noble Savages (1975)
- "The Heroic Barbarian" (from Blond Barbarians and Noble Savages (1975)
- "Notes"
- "Index"

== Reception ==
Critical response was mixed. R. D. Mullen, writing in Science Fiction Studies, called the pieces in it "generally amusing, and young people with find them informative." G. Warlock Vance in Extrapolation felt de Camp's book "seemed to read like a rehash of his Literary Swordsmen & Sorcerers," and found it "a rehash of old ideas--and many of them de Camp's alone." He noted, however, that "[t]his collection does manage to compile an extraordinary amount of critical data into a finely honed tome. If the reader is a fan of genre fiction, this book details many of the events that helped to shape the field and make interest in such writing possible. From Almuric to Zorro, de Camp covers it all."
