= All Our Yesterdays (book) =

1969 book by Harry Warner, Jr.

- First edition cover
- Author: Harry Warner, Jr.
- Language: English
- Genre: Science fiction fandom, history
- Publisher: Advent (first edition), NESFA Press (second edition)
- Publication date: 1969, 2004
- Publication place: United States
- Media type: paperback, hardcover
- Pages: 370 (second edition)
- ISBN: 1-886778-13-2 (second edition)
- OCLC: 64027304
- Preceded by: Up to Now by Jack Speer, 1939
- Followed by: A Wealth of Fable by Harry Warner, Jr., 1976

All Our Yesterdays by Harry Warner, Jr., is a history of science fiction fandom of the 1940s, an essential reference work in the field.

It was originally published by Advent in 1969; the members of the World Science Fiction Society voted its author the Hugo Award for Best Fan Writer that year. NESFA Press produced a new edition (ISBN 1-886778-13-2) with additional photographs, in 2004, after Warner's death.

Warner also wrote a related series of historical columns called "All Our Yesterdays." He later published a sequel, A Wealth of Fable, covering the 1950s, originally produced in a three-volume mimeographed edition, the first volume issued in 1976, and later expanded into hardcover form (ISBN 0-9633099-0-0) by SCIFI Press in 1992.

== Reception ==
Algis Budrys praised Warner's work as "that calm, reasoned, and, I suppose, sometimes slightly prejudiced 'fan history' that the microcosm needs as a counterweight" to Sam Moskowitz's earlier The Immortal Storm.

Science fiction fan and author Mike Resnick called the book "a fabulous, informal history, covering all the high points, reporting on (for example) the initial meeting after the war between DAW (Wollheim) and SaM (the man who barred him from the first Worldcon), filled with well over 100 photos, even indexed. It's a true treasure of fannish history and anecdotes."
