= John Myers Myers =

American writer (1906–1988)

John Myers Myers (January 11, 1906 – October 30, 1988) was an American writer. He is known best for the fantasy novel Silverlock (1949), in which a man with a Master of Business Administration travels through a fantasy land, meeting dozens of characters from myth, legend, and romance for adventure and instruction.

== Life ==
Myers was born in Northport, Long Island on January 11, 1906, to John Caldwell Myers and Alice O'Neil McCorry Myers. He was named for his grandfather John Myers, "the extra Myers, sparing me a dynastic 'II' as per race horses, cars, and yachts." Myers grew up in various places in New York, including New Paltz and New York City. He attended Bard St. Stephens College and then Middlebury College, but was expelled from the latter for writing unflattering verse about the faculty. He later attended the University of New Mexico to study anthropology, but never completed a degree. After extensive travel through Europe and the United States, Myers worked for the New York World and San Antonio Evening News. He was also an advertising copywriter. Myers served five years in the U.S. Army during World War II. He and Charlotte Shanahan met while he was stationed at Fort Knox and they were married in 1943. They had two daughters, Anne Caldwell Myers and Celia Myers. In 1948, he moved to Tempe, Arizona to do research for The Last Chance, and stayed there as he was by that time enamored of the West. While there he worked as editorial writer for the local newspaper.

As of 1984, J.M. and C.S. Myers lived "in the chaparal cock country north and east of Mesa, Arizona, within visiting range of our two daughters". At Arizona State University he had taught writing, conducted a writers conference, and assembled Western Americana for ASU Libraries.

Myers died October 30, 1988.

== Literary career ==
Myers published seventeen books, ranging from fantasy and historical fiction of the American Old West to epic poetry and histories of the West. His first book, The Harp and the Blade (1941), was a historical novel set in tenth-century France. Myers' best-known work is the literary fantasy novel Silverlock, published in 1949, which was reprinted in 1966 by Ace Books, and again in 1979 with forewords and accolades from Poul Anderson, Larry Niven and Jerry Pournelle. The novel's settings and characters, other than the protagonist, are drawn entirely from numerous other works of literature, such as the Odyssey and Don Quixote. His last book, The Moon's Fire-Eating Daughter (1981), was advertised as a sequel to Silverlock. Myers' non-fiction works included a history of the Alamo, the first biography of Doc Holliday, a study of the vigilante movement in San Francisco, and a well-researched biography of Hugh Glass, an early American fur trapper and frontiersman.

== Fiction ==
=== Fantasy ===
- Silverlock (E. P. Dutton, 1949); reprinted by Ace Books from 1966
- The Moon's Fire-Eating Daughter (The Donning Company, 1981)
- Silverlock: Including the Silverlock Companion (NESFA Press, 2004), OCLC 54884542

A Silverlock Companion: The Life and Works of John Myers Myers, edited by Fred Lerner, is a 52-page pamphlet published in 1988 (OCLC 22760287) and reprinted as a book in 1989 (OCLC 19352130).

=== Historical fiction ===
- The Harp and the Blade (1941 [1940 serial]), subject: medieval France; reprinted by The Donning Company, 1982, and Ace Books from 1983
- Out on Any Limb (1942), subject: Elizabethan England
- The Wild Yazoo (1947), subject: Mississippi frontier
- Dead Warrior (1956), western
- I, Jack Swilling (1961), western

=== Poetry ===
- Maverick Zone (1961), subject: American Old West

== Non-fiction ==
- The Alamo (1948)
- The Last Chance: Tombstone's Early Years (1950)
- Doc Holliday (1955)
- The Deaths of the Bravos (1962), Western history
- The Saga of Hugh Glass: Pirate, Pawnee, and Mountain Man (1963), reprinted by University of Nebraska Press, ISBN 0-8032-0867-7
- San Francisco's Reign of Terror (1966)
- Print in a Wild Land (1967)
- The Westerners: A Roundup of Pioneer Reminiscences (1969)
- The Border Wardens: A History of the United States Border Patrol and Its Ceaseless Struggle to Stem the Tide of Wetbacks, Booze and Pot Across America's Wildest Boundary (1971), ISBN 0-13-080218-2
