= Moon Dogs (short story collection) =

2000 short story collection

First edition (publ. NESFA Press) Cover artist: RicK Berry

Moon Dogs is a collection of science fiction short stories and essays by Michael Swanwick. It was published by NESFA Press in 2000 to commemorate his appearance as Guest of Honor at Boskone 37. It includes collaborations with Gardner Dozois and Jack Dann.
