= Zenna Henderson =

American science fiction and fantasy writer (1917–1983)

- Zenna Henderson c. 1953
- Born: Zena Chlarson; November 1, 1917; Tucson, Arizona, US
- Died: May 11, 1983 (aged 65); Tucson, Arizona, US
- Occupations: Teacher; short story author
- Writing career
- Genres: Science fiction, fantasy
- Notable work: Pilgrimage: The Book of the People
- Literary movement: Science fiction, fantasy

Zenna Chlarson Henderson (November 1, 1917 – May 11, 1983) was an American elementary school teacher and science fiction and fantasy author. Her first story was published in The Magazine of Fantasy & Science Fiction in 1951. Her work is cited as pre-feminist, often featuring middle-aged women, children, and their relationships, but with stereotyped gender roles. Many of her stories center around human aliens called "The People", who have special powers. Henderson was nominated for a Hugo Award in 1959 for her novelette Captivity. Science fiction authors Lois McMaster Bujold, Orson Scott Card, Connie Willis, Dale Bailey, and Kathy Tyers have cited her as an influence on their work.

== Biography ==
Zena Chlarson (she began using the spelling "Zenna" in the early 1950s) was born in 1917 in Tucson, Arizona, the daughter of Louis Rudolph Chlarson and Emily Vernell Rowley. She was the oldest of five children. She began reading science fiction at age 12 from magazines such as Astounding Stories, Amazing Stories, and fantasy from Weird Tales. She cited Heinlein, Bradbury, Clement, and Asimov as her favorite science fiction writers.

She received a bachelor of arts in education from Arizona State College in 1940, and taught school, primarily in the Tucson area, mainly first grade. She also taught in a "semi-ghost mining town," at Fort Huachuca, in France and Connecticut, as well as in a Japanese internment camp in Sacaton, Arizona, during World War II. She married Richard Harry Henderson in 1943, but they were divorced in 1951. In 1955 she received her MA, also from Arizona State College, and continued to teach elementary school.

Henderson was one of the first 203 female science fiction authors to publish in American science fiction magazines between 1926 and 1960. She never used a male pseudonym. In an essay on the increase in women authors of science fiction in 1950, Sam Merwin mentioned her as an up-and-coming woman SF writer. Her first story was published in The Magazine of Fantasy & Science Fiction in 1951. Her work has been called feminist, pre-feminist, and "distinctly feminine, without being politically feminist." Some feminist critics disliked the gender stereotypes present in her fiction, though her work depicts middle-aged and old women as well as women's relationships. Her women protagonists cherish social roles as mothers and sisters while also being "strong, intelligent", and "outspoken". In an analysis of "Subcommittee," Farah Mendlesohn examines how Henderson uses stereotypical gender roles to emphasize how feminine communication is conducive to peacemaking. In "Subcommittee," the wife of a general, Serena, befriends an alien mother and her child. Through their sharing of "women's things" like cooking and knitting, Serena finds out that the aliens need salt to continue their species. After hearing that peace negotiations are deteriorating, Serena interrupts a meeting with her revelation and a proposed solution. Unlike other popular science fiction at the time, which often centered around war with aliens, "Subcommittee" focuses on conflict resolution. The characters' gender roles enabled the ending plot twist, but were not the focus of speculation.

Henderson was born and baptized into the Church of Jesus Christ of Latter-day Saints. Though she never renounced her membership, after her marriage, she was no longer a churchgoing Latter-day Saint. In the standard reference Contemporary Authors, she identified as Methodist, and according to Science Fiction and Fantasy Literature, Volume 2, she was a member of Catalina United Methodist Church in Tucson. During her later years, she attended an independent charismatic fellowship. Her work contains many Christian themes and Biblical names. Many of her stories include The People, aliens who have traveled to Earth, which is their promised land. The People also invoke God as "the Power, the Presence and the Name."

Zenna Henderson died of cancer in 1983.

== Works ==
Most of Henderson's stories emphasize the theme of being different and the dangers therein. They often feature children or adolescents. Most are part of her series concerning the history of "The People", human beings from a faraway planet who are forced to emigrate to Earth when their home world is destroyed by a natural disaster.

Arriving in the late 1800s, and on arrival scattered mostly throughout the American Southwest, they are set apart by their desire to preserve their home culture, including their religious and spiritual beliefs. Their unusual abilities include telepathy, telekinesis, prophecy, and healing, which they call the "Designs and Persuasions".

The People suppress their unusual abilities as they attempt to integrate into human society. The stories describe groups of The People, as well as lonely isolated individuals, most often as they attempt to find their own communities and remain distinct in a world that does not understand them. This aspect of individuality was a common theme in most of Henderson's writing. New York Times reviewer Basil Davenport described the stories as "haunting". Brian W. Aldiss and David Wingrove noted that "As a sentimental portrait of the alien, the series out-Simaks Simak." In a book on early women science fiction writers, Eric Davin noted that all of her stories focus on "the search for community and communication," a theme shared by many women's science fiction stories from the time. Henderson's years as a school teacher helped her to write believable child characters.

Beginning with "Ararat" (1952), Henderson's The People stories appeared in magazines and anthologies, as well as the novelized Pilgrimage: The Book of the People (1961) and The People: No Different Flesh (1966). Other volumes include The People Collection (1991) and Ingathering: The Complete People Stories (1995).

A common conflict in Henderson's stories is when a child has unusual powers that a schoolteacher, parent or other caretaker discovers through observation.

For example, in "The Last Step" a children's teacher in a future fakes various petty measures to interrupt a children's game on the grounds that they take it too seriously, unaware that the "game" is in fact using sympathetic magic to save the colony from an upcoming hostile invasion. In another story "The Believing Child," a young daughter of a migrant worker believes so strongly in an imaginary magic word that its powers come true; she then uses her newfound powers to take revenge on her abusive classmates.

Compared to these are more frequent, gentler tales such as "The Anything Box," in which a teacher learns that an unhappy little girl has discovered or created a box in which she can see her heart's desire. The teacher becomes concerned that the child is escaping into the box too frequently (while at the same time craving it for herself). In the end, the teacher allows her to keep the box but warns her not to let herself get lost in it.

Henderson mentions mental illness in several tales, including obsessive-compulsive disorder in "Swept and Garnished", and agoraphobia in "Incident After". In "One of Them", a woman's latent telepathic powers cause her to lose her identity as she unwittingly probes the minds of her co-workers. In "You Know What, Teacher?" a young girl confides in her teacher of her father's philandering, and of her mother's plan for revenge.

== Adaptations in other media ==
Henderson's story "Pottage" was made into the 1972 ABC-TV Movie, The People, featuring William Shatner, Kim Darby, and Diane Varsi, and concerning the story of a group of human extraterrestrials who live in an isolated rural community on Earth. It was the directorial debut for John Korty and was produced by his sometime partner Francis Ford Coppola. It has been released on VHS format by Prism Entertainment and DVD format by American Zoetrope. The Monster Times reported in November 1972 that a sequel was in the pipeline, Birds in the Wilderness; no such film appeared.

Henderson's story "Hush" was adapted as an episode of the George A. Romero TV series Tales from the Darkside. The episode first aired in 1988.

Henderson's 1965 book The Anything Box inspired the naming of American synthpop band Anything Box in 1986. They perform a paraphrased excerpt from the story in their 1990 track "Our Dreams (Edit the Dream)."

== Awards ==
Henderson was nominated for a Hugo Award in 1959 for her novelette "Captivity". Her books were long out of print until the 1995 release of Ingathering: The Complete People Stories, published by the New England Science Fiction Association Press. Ingathering was a second place finalist in the 1996 Locus Award for Best Collection.

== Bibliography ==
- Pilgrimage: The Book of the People (1961)
- The Anything Box (1965)
- The People: No Different Flesh (1967)
- Holding Wonder (1971)
- The People Collection (1991), ISBN 055213659X, cover art by Mark Harrison
- Ingathering: The Complete People Stories (1995), NESFA Press, ISBN 0915368587
- Believing: The Other Stories of Zenna Henderson (2020), NESFA Press, ISBN 978-1610373388
