= Grand Masters' Choice =

1989 anthology edited by Andre Norton and Ingrid Zierhut

- Cover of first edition, 1989
- Editors: Andre Norton, Ingrid Zierhut
- Cover artist: Bob Eggleton
- Language: English
- Genre: Science fiction short stories
- Publisher: NESFA Press
- Publication date: 1989
- Publication place: United States
- Media type: Print (hardcover)
- Pages: 221 pp.
- ISBN: 0-915368-42-0

Grand Masters' Choice is an anthology of science fiction short stories edited by Andre Norton and Ingrid Zierhut. It was first published as the convention book for Noreascon Three in a limited edition hardcover by NESFA Press in August 1989. The first paperback edition was published by Tor Books in October 1991. The paperback edition credited Norton alone as editor.

The book collects eight novellas, novelettes and short stories by the eight science fiction authors then recognized as Grand Master of the field by the Science Fiction Writers of America. The works included were selected by their authors as the best short works written during their careers. The stories were previously published in the magazines The American Legion Magazine, Astounding, The Magazine of Fantasy & Science Fiction, Galaxy, Fantastic, Playboy, and Science Fiction Quarterly, and the anthology Flashing Swords! #2. The book includes an introduction by Robert Bloch.

== Contents ==
- "Introduction" (Robert Bloch)
- "The Long Watch" (Robert A. Heinlein)
- "With Folded Hands" (Jack Williamson)
- "The Autumn Land" (Clifford D. Simak)
- "A Gun for Dinosaur" (L. Sprague de Camp)
- "Lean Times in Lankhmar" (Fritz Leiber)
- "Toads of Grimmerdale" (Andre Norton)
- "Transit of Earth" (Arthur C. Clarke)
- "The Last Question" (Isaac Asimov)
