= Blond Barbarians and Noble Savages =

1975 collection of essays by L. Sprague de Camp

- Cover of Blond Barbarians and Noble Savages
- Author: L. Sprague de Camp
- Cover artist: James Shull
- Language: English
- Genre: Biography
- Publisher: T-K Graphics
- Publication date: 1975
- Publication place: United States
- Media type: Print (Paperback)
- Pages: 46 pp

Blond Barbarians and Noble Savages is a 1975 collection of essays on the fantasy writers Robert E. Howard and H. P. Lovecraft by science-fiction writer L. Sprague de Camp, first published by T-K Graphics. It was reissued in 1986 by Borgo Press as number 2 in its Essays on Fantastic Literature series.

== Contents ==
The work consists of an introduction and three essays, "Lovecraft and the Aryans," "Howard and the Celts," and "The Heroic Barbarian" (a revision of the author's earlier "Barbarians I Have Known"), together with bibliographies and an index. The second and third essays also appeared in de Camp's anthology of pieces on Howard, The Spell of Conan (1980). All three were reprinted in the later de Camp collection Rubber Dinosaurs and Wooden Elephants (1996).

== Reception ==
Brian Stableford in Vector 81, June 1977, wrote of the book that its " three short essays examin[e] Lovecraft's flirtation with the myth of the Aryan superman, and compar[e] R. E. Howard's barbarian mythology with some comments on historical and social reality." Of its author, he notes that "[d]e Camp never writes badly and is a scrupulously careful researcher. He is always worth reading, and here he is more relaxed and off-hand than in his more commercial work. Fans will appreciate the casualness - and why not? This formal laxity is a common factor in work done by professionals for small presses - largely because they are more sure of, and more at home with, the likely audience. It may dilute some of the strengths of more rigorous critical writing but it has its own communicative merits."

The book was also reviewed by Darrell Schweitzer in Fantasiae v. 3, no. 6, June 1975, J. Rosenbaum in Science Fiction Review Monthly 5, July 1975, and Don D'Ammassa in Science Fiction Chronicle v. 10, no. 5, February 1989.
