= Arthur Okamura =

American artist

- Born: February 24, 1932; Long Beach, California
- Died: July 10, 2009 (aged 77); Bolinas, California
- Education: Art Institute of Chicago; Yale University Art School; University of Chicago
- Known for: painting, drawing, screen printing
- Movement: San Francisco Renaissance

Arthur Okamura (February 24, 1932 - July 10, 2009) was an American artist, working in screen printing, drawing and painting. He lived in the San Francisco Bay Area, and was Professor Emeritus at the California College of the Arts in San Francisco, California. His work is in the permanent collections at the Smithsonian Institution in Washington, D.C., the Whitney Museum in New York, and the San Francisco Museum of Modern Art. He is associated with the San Francisco Renaissance. He illustrated numerous works of literature and poetry, published a book on games and toys for children, and created illustrations for the TV movie The People.

== Early life ==
Okamura was born in Long Beach, California, on February 24, 1932. Okamura was an American of Japanese descent.

During World War II, as a child, Okamura and his family were relocated to the Granada War Relocation Center in southeast Colorado. As a result of Executive Order 9066, the United States government forced the relocation of many American residents of Japanese ancestry to a Japanese American internment camp.

== Education ==
Okamura attended the Art Institute of Chicago from 1950 to 1954, Yale School of Art in 1954, and the University of Chicago in 1951, 1953 and 1957. He moved to California after his university studies, living in San Francisco, then the artist colony of Bolinas.

== Career ==
He taught at the California College of the Arts for over 30 years, retiring in 1997. He died July 10, 2009, in Bolinas.

=== Exhibitions ===
His first solo exhibition was in 1953, at the Frank Ryan Gallery, in Chicago. He has had exhibits at the Oakland Museum of Art (1959), the California Palace of the Legion of Honor (1962), and the San Francisco Museum of Modern Art (1968). In addition to being in the aforementioned permanent collections, his work is in the collections of the Legion of Honor, the Oakland Museum, the Stanford University Collection, and the California College of the Arts. He had numerous solo and group or joint exhibits over the last 50 years. Catalogs of his exhibits have been published. He is represented by the Braunstein/Quay Gallery, San Francisco.

== Bibliography ==
- 1234567890, by Arthur Okamura and Robert Creeley. Shambhala Publications, 1971 ISBN 978-0-87773-013-2
- Calm and Clear, by Lama Nipham, translated by Tarthang Tulku, cover and illustrations by Arthur Okamura. Berkeley, Dharma Publishing, 1973 ISBN 0-913546-02-X
- Just Space: Poems, 1979-1989, by Joanne Kyger, illustrated by Arthur Okamura. David R. Godine, 1991 ISBN 978-0-87685-835-6
- Ten Poems by Issa, Robert Bly, translator. illustrated by Arthur Okamura. Floating Island Publications, 1992 ISBN 978-0-912449-41-8
- The Paper Propeller, The Spinning Quarter, The Jumping Frog +38 Other Amazing Tricks You Can Do with Stuff Lying Around the House, written and illustrated by Arthur Okamura. Bolinas, CA; Shelter Publications. ISBN 0-936070-23-4
- The Healing Spirit of Haiku, David H. Rosen and Joel Weishaus, Illustrated by Arthur Okamura. New York: Random House/North Atlantic Books (2004) ISBN 978-1-55643-530-0

== Awards ==
- 1951 Neysa McMein Purchase Award, Whitney Museum of Art
- 1957 Marin Cahn Award, Art Institute of Chicago
- 1960 Schwagacher-Frey Award, San Francisco Museum of Art
- 1976 Purchase Prize, San Francisco Arts Commission
