= From Hell to Texas =

1958 film by Henry Hathaway

- Theatrical release poster
- Directed by: Henry Hathaway
- Screenplay by: Robert Buckner; Wendell Mayes
- Based on: Charles O. Locke; The Hell Bent Kid
- Starring: Don Murray; Diane Varsi
- Cinematography: Wilfred M. Cline
- Edited by: Johnny Ehrin
- Music by: Daniele Amfitheatrof
- Color process: Color by DeLuxe
- Production company: 20th Century Fox
- Distributed by: 20th Century Fox
- Release date: June 1, 1958
- Running time: 100 minutes
- Country: United States
- Language: English

From Hell to Texas is a 1958 American Western film directed by Henry Hathaway and starring Don Murray and Diane Varsi.

== Plot ==
Ruthless cattle baron Hunter Boyd orders his riders to capture a former ranch-hand, Tod Lohman, suspected of murdering one of Boyd's sons, Shorty.

The victim's brother, Otis Boyd, initiates a stampede to facilitate Lohman's capture, but Tod evades capture by driving the animals in an opposite direction. Later, Tod gets the drop on Otis's brother, Tom, who has been trailing him. Tod insists he did not kill Tom's brother, Shorty, and explains what did happen. Tod tells Tom to relay the truth to his family and sends him on his way. While trying one more time to kill Tod, Tom shoots the man's horse, instead, before retreating home.

On foot, Tod collapses near a river bank. He is found by rancher Amos Bradley and his daughter Juanita, who provide food and shelter. Juanita takes a liking to Tod, who is searching for his missing father; he was raised by his mother, who instilled in him biblical principles and lessons.

Hunter Boyd and his men come upon Tod and the Bradley's. In gratitude for not shooting Tom and Tom's killing Tod's horse, Boyd permits Tod a horse and a four-hour head start, then resumes the chase.

Tod rides into the town of Socorro, where he discovers that his father has died. He visits Amos Bradley's ranch. While there, Juanita and he fall in love. He knows he must keep running, but hopes to return permanently. Hunter Boyd, Tom, and a member of the posse confront Bradley and wound the old man when he will not let them search his home for Tod. This proves the last straw for Tod, who aborts his plan to flee and takes on the Boyds in town. During the gunfight, as ordered by his father, Tom shoots a chandelier in an attempt to douse the lighting. Tom is engulfed by the resulting flames. Tod's instincts take over and he saves Tom's life. An appreciative Hunter Boyd thus calls off the vendetta.

== Cast ==
- Don Murray as Tod Lohman
- Diane Varsi as Juanita Bradley
- Chill Wills as Amos Bradley
- Dennis Hopper as Tom Boyd
- R. G. Armstrong as Hunter Boyd
- Jay C. Flippen as Jake Leffertfinger
- Margo as Mrs. Bradley
- John Larch as Hal Carmody
- Ken Scott as Otis Boyd
- Rodolfo Acosta as Bayliss
- Salvador Baguez as Cardito

== Production ==
Henry Hathaway made the film because it was the only project available at Fox at the time. He said the script was "rotten" but liked the central idea and agreed to make it if the script could be rewritten. Zanuck agreed and Hathaway and Wendell Mayes rewrote the script in two weeks. Mayes called it "a superb Western". Mayes later recalled:

Henry Hathaway is very easy for a writer to work with. He's absolutely dreadful for actors to work with: he's probably the toughest son of a bitch in Hollywood. He is tough for a reason: Hathaway is not the most articulate man in the world, and he maintains control of his set and of his crew and his actors by being cantankerous and rather cruel sometimes. He knows what he's doing; he isn't doing it out of hand. He's doing it deliberately because this is the way he's discovered he can work. It isn't true with a writer. He's a very gentle man when you sit down with him in a room to write. He doesn't feel that he has to browbeat you.

When first offered the role of Tod Lohman, Don Murray turned it down, complaining that the script for "The Hell-Bent Kid" was "filled with unnecessary violence." According to Hollywood columnist Hedda Hopper, the actor eventually agreed to appear in the movie, but only after a complete rewrite job was done, omitting all the elements that Murray complained about. The actor then began work by "taking daily riding lessons to get in shape for the cowboy role." Hathaway said Murray was "not a strong actor but an obstinate one. I played on that. I couldn't play him strong so I played him stubborn, almost fanatical." Hathaway says Murray refused to play a killer so the script was rewritten that the person Murray shoots is shown to survive.

Dennis Hopper, who had trained as a Method actor, walked off the set of From Hell to Texas several times over disagreements with director Henry Hathaway, who would continually order Hopper to "get over there and hit your mark and say your lines like I tell ya." After shooting on the film was completed, Hopper acquired the reputation of being "difficult." He was dropped from his Hollywood contract and did not act in a major studio film again until he appeared in The Sons of Katie Elder (1965). Ironically, that film was also directed by Henry Hathaway.

Hathaway has described the editing of From Hell to Texas in an oral history edited by Rudy Behlmer and conducted by production designer Polly Platt. It describes the role of Barbara McLean, then the head of the editing department at 20th Century Fox. After Ms. McLean's son, Johnny Ehrin, took over editing chores on the film while Hathaway was already at work directing another film, the director returned to the studio to look at the completed work and was aghast at what he saw. He contacted McLean, who took a look at her son's editing and was equally horrified. So she and Hathaway spent an entire weekend, with virtually no rest, re-editing the film. Hathaway concludes the story by judging McLean's work approvingly. He recalls thinking that her editing had made his western "another movie. Just a complete other picture".

Fox decided to change the title of the film from The Hell Bent Kid at late notice after advertising had been prepared as it was decided that the original title did not adequately describe the film's values and it might also be considered a B-movie.

== Reception ==
Bosley Crowther, film critic for The New York Times, called the film "a good, solid picture, not great in the class of High Noon, but full of continually lively action." Furthermore, the critic praised R. G. Armstrong's performance as "first-rate." Yet Crowther also noted that From Hell to Texas was ultimately indistinguishable from the innumerable TV-western serials that, in 1958, flooded network television's prime-time schedule.

More recently, author John Howard Reid considered the film a disappointment, with "weak and uninteresting" characters. Moreover, Reid cited technical flaws such as "obvious day-for-night lensing and glaring process screen backdrops"

Film historian Chris Langley has grouped From Hell to Texas with two other Henry Hathaway westerns, Nevada Smith (1966) and True Grit (1969) to form what the writer calls "Hathaway's Western revenge trilogy."
