= A Wealth of Fable =

Book by Harry Warner

- First editions, three volumes
- Author: Harry Warner, Jr.
- Cover artist: Ross Chamberlain
- Language: English
- Genre: Science fiction fandom, history
- Publisher: Fanhistorica Press (first edition); SCIFI Press (second edition)
- Publication date: 1977, 1992
- Publication place: United States
- Media type: Mimeographed, hardcover
- Pages: xiv+456 (second edition)
- ISBN: 0-9633099-0-0 (second edition)
- OCLC: 30380163
- Preceded by: All Our Yesterdays by Harry Warner, Jr., 1969

A Wealth of Fable by Harry Warner, Jr., is a Hugo Award-winning history of science fiction fandom of the 1950s, an essential reference work in the field. It is a follow-up to Warner's All Our Yesterdays (ISBN 1-886778-13-2), which covered the 1940s, and helped to earn Warner a Hugo Award in 1969.

According to science fiction fan and author Mike Resnick, "It's not even a sequel, but rather a continuation, of All Our Yesterdays, heavily illustrated, obviously written by the same hand, chock full of the anecdotes that almost instantly become fannish legend."

It was originally published by Joe Siclari in a three-volume, mimeographed Fanhistorica Press edition in 1977. SCIFI Press brought out an expanded hardcover edition (ISBN 0-9633099-0-0) in 1992. The members of the World Science Fiction Society voted that version the Hugo Award for Best Related Book.

Warner also wrote a related series of historical columns called "All Our Yesterdays."
