= The People (film) =

1972 television film

- Genre: Drama; Science fiction
- Based on: Pottage; Araret; Gilead; Captivity by Zenna Henderson
- Written by: James M. Miller
- Directed by: John Korty
- Starring: Kim Darby; William Shatner; Diane Varsi; Laurie Walters; Dan O'Herlihy
- Theme music composer: Carmine Coppola
- Country of origin: United States
- Original language: English

Production
- Executive producers: Francis Ford Coppola; Charles W. Fries
- Producer: Gerald I. Isenberg
- Cinematography: Edward Rosson
- Editor: Patrick Kennedy
- Running time: 74 minutes
- Production companies: American Zoetrope; Metromedia Producers Corporation

Original release
- Network: ABC
- Release: January 22, 1972

The People is a 1972 science fiction TV movie, broadcast as an ABC Movie of the Week on January 22, 1972. It is primarily based on "Pottage", a novella by Zenna Henderson, with elements of Henderson's stories "Araret", "Gilead" and "Captivity." It stars Kim Darby, William Shatner, Diane Varsi, Laurie Walters, and Dan O'Herlihy. Darby and Shatner had previously appeared together in the Star Trek episode "Miri."

== Plot summary ==
Melodye Amerson is a young teacher who goes to a remote area to work with a group of individuals who have isolated themselves from civilization and maintained an independent community, vaguely similar to the Amish or a religious commune. Melodye is unnerved by the secretive behavior of her students, and the fact that all fun, games and activities she proposes are forbidden to them. Valancy, an elder in the community, advises Melodye to stay, because she senses that things are about to change in the valley, and Melodye herself is a part of that change.

Melodye soon discovers that the secluded and "backwards" residents are actually aliens with mild paranormal powers. A natural disaster destroyed their planet, and they are hoping to establish a life on Earth. Landing in the late 1800s, initially they shared their secret with local residents, but found themselves condemned as witches. Many were killed, and the survivors forbade their children ever to use their abilities, even with extreme discretion. Young adults like Valancy (and even some of the older people) have been pushing for an end to these restrictions.

== Cast ==
- Kim Darby—Melodye Amerson
- William Shatner—Dr. Curtis
- Diane Varsi—Valancy Carmody
- Dan O'Herlihy—Sol Diemus
- Laurie Walters—Karen Diemus
- Johanna Baer—Bethie

== Production ==
The children's illustrations in the film were done by Arthur Okamura.

The film was the first TV movie for John Korty, and was produced by his sometime partner Francis Ford Coppola, listed as the Executive Producer on the actual film, and scored by his father Carmine (billed as "Carmen Coppola").

The Monster Times reported in November 1972 that a sequel was in the pipeline, Birds in the Wilderness; no such film appeared.

== Reception ==
One history of science fiction reports that the film stood out in its time "for being neither shoddy nor sentimentalized."
