= Charles Herbert Locke =

Australian company director

Bert Locke
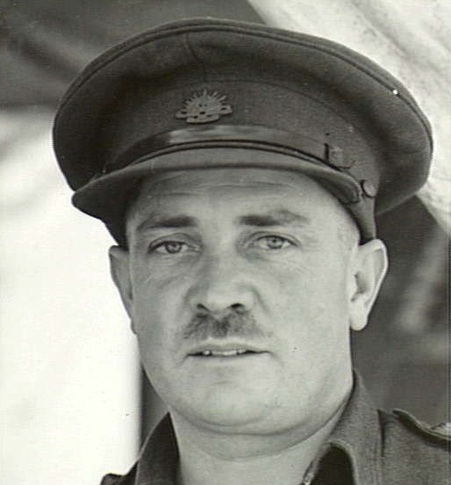
- Lieutenant Colonel Bert Locke in army uniform during World War II
- Born: Charles Herbert Locke; 24 September 1910; Turramurra, New South Wales, Australia
- Died: 15 May 1977 (aged 66); San Francisco, California, United States
- Education: Newington College; Wrekin College
- Occupations: Chairman of Tooheys and Lendlease
- Spouses: Lesley Alison Vine (married 1936–1972); Mary Clare Luya Gregory (1973–1977)
- Children: 3 sons and 1 daughter
- Awards: Officer of the Order of the British Empire

Charles Herbert "Bert" Locke OBE (21 September 1910 – 15 May 1977) was an Australian company director, who served as chairman of Tooheys and Lendlease, and a charity fundraiser. During World War II he was in command of Z Special Unit and rose to the rank of lieutenant colonel.

== Early life ==
Locke was born in Turramurra, New South Wales, the fifth of seven children, and was educated at Newington College (1920–1925) and at Wrekin College in Shropshire, England. He worked in insurance before a brief stint as a jackaroo and then with Prudential Assurance where he rose to be Sydney managing agent with power of attorney for the British Equitable Assurance.

== Career ==
=== Army service ===
In 1938 Locke was commissioned in the Militia. He was transferred to the Australian Imperial Force in 1940. He was promoted to captain and served with the 9th Division in the Middle East. He was mentioned in dispatches after service in Tobruk and Libya. In 1945 he took command of Z Special Unit and became a lieutenant colonel.

=== Business career ===
Returning from the war, Locke again worked in the insurance business and was involved in several Australian companies. He served as chairman of Tooheys, Lendlease, International Computers (Australia) and Anthony Squires. He was a board member of the Australia Hotel Co, Peko-Wallsend, Commercial & General Acceptance, Australian Equity Corporation, Permanent Trustee Co of New South Wales and the local board of Colonial Mutual Life Assurance Society.

== Personal ==
In 1936 Locke married Lesley Alison Vine, with whom he had four children (3 sons and 1 daughter). Lesley died in 1972. Locke married Mary Clare Luya Gregory in 1973. He died in San Francisco, California in 1977, from a myocardial infarction.

== Honours ==
Locke was made an Officer of the Order of the British Empire in 1968.
