= Ethan of Athos =

1986 science fiction novel by Lois McMaster Bujold

- First edition cover
- Author: Lois McMaster Bujold
- Audio read by: Grover Gardner
- Cover artist: Alan Gutierrez
- Language: English
- Series: Vorkosigan Saga
- Genre: Science fiction
- Publisher: Baen Books
- Publication date: December 1986
- Publication place: United States
- Media type: Print; Audiobook
- Pages: 237
- ISBN: 0-671-65604-X
- OCLC: 14949527
- Preceded by: The Warrior's Apprentice
- Followed by: Falling Free

Ethan of Athos is a 1986 science fiction novel by American author Lois McMaster Bujold. The title character is Dr. Ethan Urquhart, Chief of Biology at the Sevarin District Reproduction Centre on the planet Athos, who is sent to find out what happened to a shipment of vital ovarian tissue cultures. Set in the fictional universe of Bujold's Vorkosigan Saga, the novel mentions but does not feature her usual protagonist Miles Vorkosigan. To date, Bujold has never revisited the settings of Athos or Kline Station in her many subsequent novels, but the events of Ethan of Athos are later referred to indirectly in the novels Borders of Infinity (1989) and Cetaganda (1995).

Bujold had written her first novel Shards of Honor and its sequel The Warrior's Apprentice — both unpublished — when she wrote Ethan of Athos, a standalone work that was purposely short "because the current cargo-cult rumor amongst the wanna-be-published back then was that editors would be more likely to read a short manuscript." All three novels were subsequently sold, and published in 1986.

Bujold named Athos, a planet founded and maintained as an exclusively male-populated colony with a planetary religion and ideology supporting this single-sex structure, after the Greek Mount Athos, which has prohibited the entry of women for religious reasons since even before the ban was officially proclaimed by the Byzantine emperor Constantine Monomachos in 1046.

Ethan of Athos has been reprinted several times, and appeared in the 2001 Bujold omnibus Miles, Mystery and Mayhem alongside Cetaganda and the novella "Labyrinth". The novel was released on audio cassette in September 1999 narrated by Michael Hanson and Carol Cowan, and as a digital audiobook in March 2009 narrated by Grover Gardner.

== Plot summary ==
Dr. Ethan Urquhart, Chief of Biology at the Sevarin District Reproduction Centre on Athos, is upset to find that his long-awaited shipment of ovarian tissue cultures from off-planet consists of an unusable mixture of dead and animal tissues. An all-male planetary colony, Athos relies on uterine replicator technology for reproduction, but the centuries-old cultures introduced by the original colonists have recently begun deteriorating into senescence. The Population Council of Athos sends a reluctant Ethan to the planet Jackson's Whole, where the shipment originated, in search of a fresh batch of tissue cultures and (if possible) a refund from the supplier, House Bharaputra, one of the crime syndicates which rule Jackson's Whole. This already difficult assignment is made more so because it means dealing with women, whom Athosians are taught to view as demonic and terrifying.

Ethan arrives at the interstellar hub of Kline Station and immediately encounters his first woman, Commander Elli Quinn, a rather unorthodox intelligence officer with the Dendarii Free Mercenary Fleet (and a subordinate of Admiral Naismith's). Though she is pleasant and even helpful, Ethan is wary of her. He is soon abducted and interrogated by military agents from Cetaganda who are seeking a fugitive named Terrence Cee, as well as their own lost tissue cultures. They refuse to believe that Ethan is not an opposing intelligence operative. Elli rescues Ethan from certain execution. They become reluctant allies; Elli explains that she has actually been hired by House Bharaputra to track the Cetagandans, and for her own reasons determine what their interest is in the tissue cultures and how it relates to a secret Cetagandan research project.

Terrence approaches Ethan with a request for asylum, revealing himself to be the last survivor of a Cetagandan genetic project to create telepaths. Although his telepathy is reliable, it has a small range and can only be triggered for a short amount of time by ingesting large doses of the amino acid tyramine. Terrance's female counterpart, Janine, had been killed in their escape, but he managed to preserve her body and transport it to Jackson's Whole, where he paid House Bharaputra to splice her genes into the ovarian cultures that were intended for Athos. Terrence had planned to also emigrate to Athos with the cultures, but had been delayed on his way to Kline Station, and is now horrified to learn that the cultures were stolen.

The Cetagandans had tracked Terrence to Jackson's Whole; arriving after his departure, they killed the Bharaputra researchers who had worked with him and destroyed their records. They then traced the tissue shipment to Kline Station, knowing Terrence would eventually come for it, though they have no knowledge of what happened to the original cultures and are desperate to reclaim them. Elli and Ethan manage to have the Cetagandans seized by Kline Station security, just as they discover that a minor official at the station had, for petty personal reasons, "thrown out" the Bharaputran tissue cultures that contained Janine's genes and replaced them with the useless biological material. Elli attempts to recruit Terrence for the Dendarii; he refuses, but gives Elli a small genetic sample. Meanwhile, Ethan asks Elli for (and receives) one of her ovaries to create a new tissue culture. After her departure, the original Bharaputran shipment unexpectedly turns up intact and usable, not destroyed. Ethan buys a new set of ovarian cultures from Beta Colony anyway as a cover, uses their packaging to relabel the cultures with Janine's genes, and returns with them and Terrence to Athos.

=== Athos ===
In the novel, the planet Athos is an all-male colony with a self-sustaining economy that is virtually independent of interstellar trade. Called a "monastery" planet by Bujold, it had been settled some 200 years earlier as a sanctuary away from women, who had become mythologized as "demonic" due to the "madness" they cause in men. With the planetary religion and ideology supporting this single-sex structure, all incoming information is screened so that all references to — and images of — women are removed. Athos is remote, and physical contact with the rest of human civilization is limited to an annual interstellar census courier that brings information, supplies and the rare immigrant.

The population is sustained using uterine replicator technology, and by design only male offspring are conceived. Through military and community service, Athosians earn "Social Duty Credits" towards reproduction. Regulations also allow for a "Designated Alternate Parent" who can earn Social Duty Credits by coparenting a partner's sons. Homosexuality is generally the norm on Athos, and while partnerships are typically romantic and sexual, some are merely mutually beneficial arrangements based on finances and child-rearing.

As much as Athosians are innately misogynistic, homophobia still exists elsewhere in the universe and is sometimes casually directed at the population of Athos. Athos is named after the Greek Mount Athos monastery where no females, including female animals, are allowed.

== Critical reception ==
Saying that "it would be hard to imagine a more unlikely hero for an SF adventure novel than a homosexual obstetrician," Booklist called Ethan of Athos "Bujold's third remarkable novel in a year" with "a compellingly attractive protagonist", going on to declare the novel "highly recommended for all SF collections." Noting that Ethan of Athos is nothing like Bujold's previous two books, Jo Walton wrote of the novel:

The thing that makes this good is Ethan's unruffled innocence; the charming utopian Athos, where you have to earn social duty credits to be entitled to a son; the quiet acceptance of homosexuality as the norm on Athos (there is no actual onstage sex in the book); the ecologically obsessed Kline Station; and the fast-paced plot that doesn’t give you time to think.

Walton also writes that "I couldn't have imagined what a feminist notion a planet of men is, and how tied up with nurturing children Athos is, accounting for the costs in a way that doesn't dismiss it as 'women’s work.'" Library Journal noted that "the plot-driven story moves swiftly and will engage SF fans of all subgenres". Nicki Gerlach of SF Site wrote, "Bujold's got an uncanny ability to create multidimensional, flawed, and loveable characters in a very short space. Even though Ethan is almost painfully naïve throughout the book, it's hard not to sympathize with him and cheer for him right from the beginning." She also praises Bujold's dialogue, which blends humor and "snarky wit" with "the action, the politics, and the emotional pathos that make up the rest of the story." Gerlach also praises Bujold's deftness at "introducing more serious topics in her fiction, without having the story become entirely about The Issues." She writes:

In this case, the story on the surface is essentially a spy thriller, but there are deeper layers dealing with sexism, the rights of the individual vs. the society, and homophobia. The sexism angle is the most obvious; after all, Athos is a society founded for the express purpose of protecting men from the evil, corrupting influence of women. Watching Ethan deal with the contrast between his indoctrinated beliefs and the reality of meeting actual women was fascinating, and I appreciated that Bujold left him not-quite-converted and still grappling with his prejudices at the end of the book, rather than taking the easier but less-realistic path of a complete epiphany.

== See also ==
- LGBT themes in speculative fiction
- Reproduction and pregnancy in speculative fiction
- Sex and sexuality in speculative fiction
- Single-gender world
