= Brothers in Arms (Bujold novel) =

1989 novel by Lois McMaster Bujold

- The first edition of Brothers in Arms
- Author: Lois McMaster Bujold
- Audio read by: Grover Gardner
- Language: English
- Series: Vorkosigan Saga
- Genre: Science fiction
- Publisher: Baen Books
- Publication date: 1989
- Publication place: United States
- Preceded by: Falling Free
- Followed by: The Vor Game

Brothers in Arms is a science fiction novel by American writer Lois McMaster Bujold, part of the Vorkosigan Saga. It was the fifth book published in the series, and is the twelfth story, including novellas, in the internal chronology of the series. Brothers in Arms was first published by Baen Books in January 1989, and is included in the 2002 omnibus Miles Errant.

== Plot summary ==
Shortly after rescuing thousands of prisoners of war from the Cetagandans (as detailed in the novella "Borders of Infinity"), Admiral Miles Naismith and his Dendarii mercenaries arrive on Earth, fleeing Cetagandan retribution and needing to repair the resultant damage to their ships.

Miles visits the Barrayaran Embassy in London to obtain desperately needed payment for their last mission. He reports to Captain Duv Galeni, his Imperial Security superior and a Komarran whose aunt was one of the victims of an infamous massacre of civilians allegedly committed by Miles' father. As the funds will have to come from the nearest sector headquarters in another star system, Miles resumes his real identity as Lieutenant Vorkosigan and is assigned to the embassy as third assistant military attaché, under Galeni's command. He finds his cousin Ivan Vorpatril is the second assistant attaché. Galeni later mysteriously disappears.

During his wait, Miles has to frantically fend off financial disaster due to the Dendarii not being paid. Then he is abducted, and his place taken by a clone created and trained as an assassin by Komarran diehards determined to free their planet. The Komarrans are led by Ser Galen, Galeni's own father, who had been presumed killed while fighting against the Barrayaran occupiers. Miles is locked up with Galeni, who has been interrogated using drugs, but has resisted his father's attempts to get him to join the Komarran resistance. Miles himself is given a dose of fast-penta, a truth drug, but his reaction to it is idiosyncratic. Instead of docilely answering all questions, he becomes manic; he finds that he can beat the drug by flying off on wild tangents, such as reciting military manuals, poems and plays from memory. Meeting his clone, Miles tells him that he could claim his rights as Miles' brother under Betan law. Just before Miles and Galeni are to be executed, they are inadvertently rescued by his Dendarii subordinate (and lover) Elli Quinn.

Galen captures Vorpatril and uses him to force a tense meeting in the bowels of the Thames Barrier with Miles, who unexpectedly brings along Galeni. Galen disarms them, then orders the clone to kill Miles. However, the talks Miles has had with his clone bear fruit. The clone shoots and kills Galen instead, then flees. Complicating matters are Cetagandan and Barrayaran assassination squads (targeting Naismith and the clone, respectively), a Dendarii contingent and the local police, all converging on their location. Miles, with his usual tactical wizardry, is able to get himself, his clone, Vorpatril and Galeni safely away. As an added bonus, Miles arranges for the Cetagandans to see him and his clone together, "proving" that Naismith and Vorkosigan are not the same person. (It is revealed that Galen intercepted all messages to sector headquarters, explaining both the lack of payment and Miles' assignment on Earth.)

Miles is well aware his Betan mother would be greatly displeased if he did not help what she would consider his sibling. According to Barrayaran tradition, his brother would be named Mark Pierre Vorkosigan. Miles gives the psychologically scarred "Mark" a considerable sum of money and an invitation to claim his Barrayaran heritage, if he wants to—or dares—then lets him go.

As Miles prepares to depart Earth, his Dendarii mentor, Ky Tung, announces his retirement.

== Reception ==
Jo Walton, writing at Tor.com, praised Bujold's depiction of "the way politics and technology move and change and interact and things go on outside of the stories"; however, she also stated that it was a poor place to begin reading the Vorkosigan series, because much of its emotional power depended on a pre-existing familiarity with the characters and setting, such that although she "liked it enough to finish (reading) it, and to pick up another book by the same author", she "came to (the) book without already caring, and it didn’t make (her) care." The SF Site, reviewing the audiobook edition, similarly felt that it didn't "really work as an entry point (into the series)", but lauded the inclusion of "ethical issues about identity and personhood and individual rights", and observed parallels to The Comedy of Errors.

James Nicoll commended Bujold's choice not to depict future Earth as a dystopia, and noted that Ser Galen's plan failed because it "require(d) many complicated events to happen in the right order at the right time."
