= Diane Varsi =

American actress

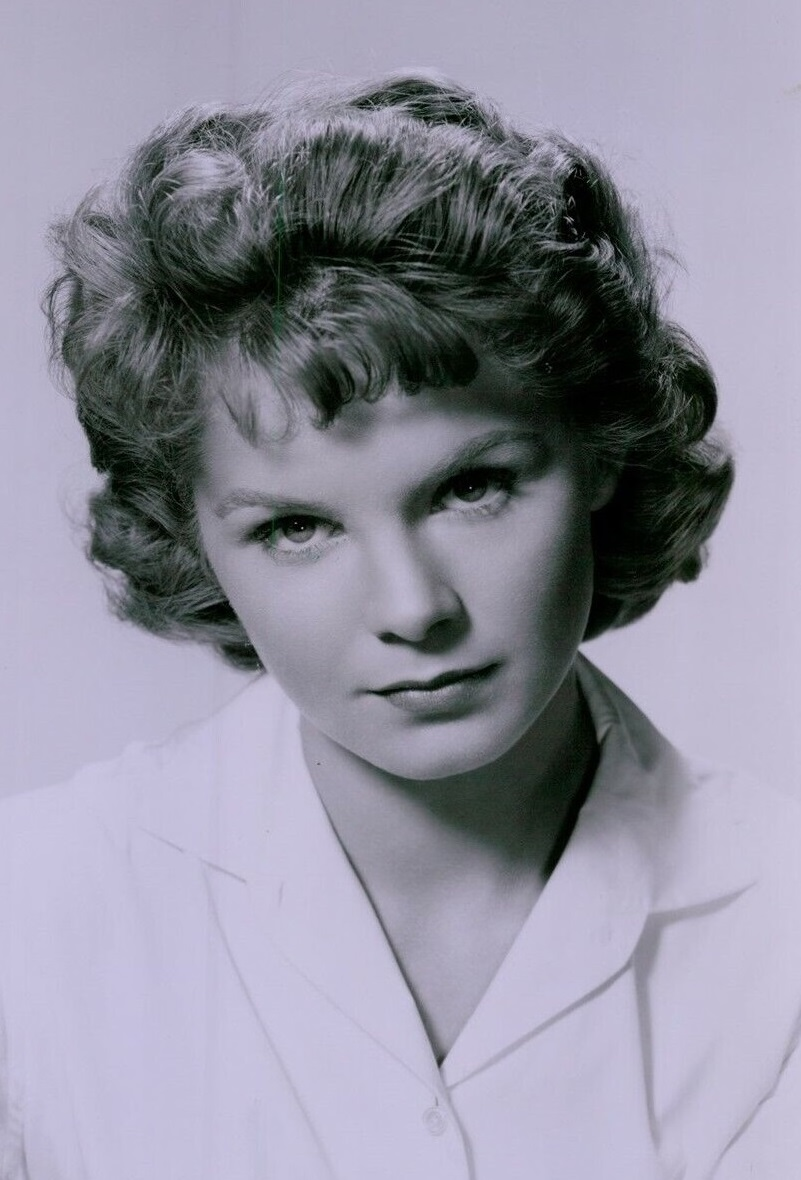
- Varsi in 1958
- Born: Diane Marie Antonia Varsi; February 23, 1938; San Mateo, California, U.S.
- Died: November 19, 1992 (aged 54); Los Angeles, California, U.S.
- Resting place: Mount Tamalpais Cemetery
- Education: Bennington College
- Years active: 1957–1977
- Spouses: James Dickson (m. 1956; div. 1958) Michael Hausman (m. 1961; div. 1965) Russell Parker (m. 1966; div. 1970)
- Children: 2

"The very thing that led me to want to act was very mysterious, even to me. I thought there was a whole communal feeling in film. That the idea of film was to be a service of humanity, a means of communication. But the spirit was power."

— Varsi on her acting motives and the film industry.

Diane Marie Antonia Varsi (February 23, 1938 – November 19, 1992) was an American film actress best known for her performances in Peyton Place – her film debut, for which she was nominated for an Academy Award – and the cult film Wild in the Streets. She left Hollywood to pursue personal and artistic aims, notably at Bennington College in Vermont, where she studied poetry with poet and translator Ben Belitt.

== Early life ==
Varsi was born in San Mateo, California, a suburb of San Francisco, the daughter of Beatrice (née DeMerchant) and Russell Varsi. Varsi unsuccessfully tried to become a model and a restaurant hostess in her teen years. While in high school, she was called an "oddball" by her classmates. She often was truant from school to visit San Francisco, so was labeled a "rebel". She dropped out of school in her junior year at age 15, failing in all studies, and saying: "I was bored. I didn't like the social sides – the cliques." Around the same time, she married an 18-year-old. Their marriage was annulled before her son Shawn was born.

She joined the San Francisco ballet in the 1950s and initially planned to become a folk singer. She later hitchhiked to Los Angeles with a friend.

== Peyton Place ==
Despite having only experience as an actress in a stage production of Gigi, she made her screen debut at age 18 as Allison MacKenzie in Peyton Place (1957), receiving an Academy Award nomination for Best Supporting Actress for her performance. The following year, Varsi shared the Golden Globe Award for New Star of the Year – Actress with Sandra Dee and Carolyn Jones. Several famous actresses were tested for the main role in the big-budget film, until the then-unknown Varsi was cast in May 1957. She was discovered by producer Buddy Adler, who immediately put her under contract at 20th Century Fox.

== Career ==
By the time she was cast, Varsi already had an agent and had been searching for film roles for a long while, without any luck. She made rounds at several studios, but according to the actress, they all thought she was suitable for character parts only. She was even dropped by her agent in 1956, because he saw no future in her career.

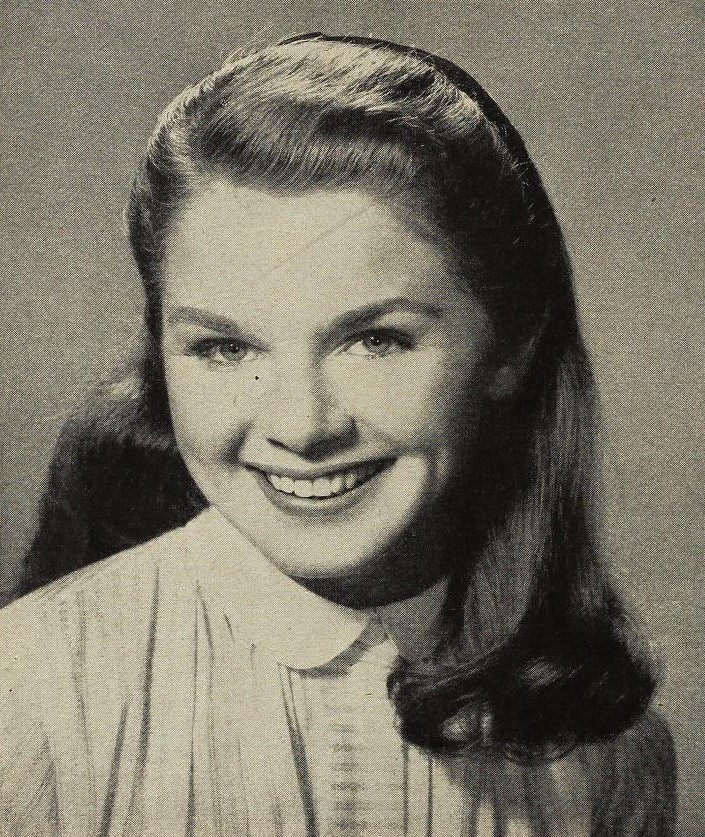
Diane Varsi as Alisson Mackenzie in Peyton Place (1957)

Before Peyton Place was released, Adler cast Varsi opposite Don Murray in From Hell to Texas (1958). She appeared in the films Ten North Frederick (1958) and Compulsion (1959). While filming Ten North Frederick, Varsi suffered a nervous breakdown, collapsed, and was hospitalized. She later said: "I'm still trying to find myself. It's still hard for me to separate illusion from reality...I don't know whether acting is the form of creativity best for me."

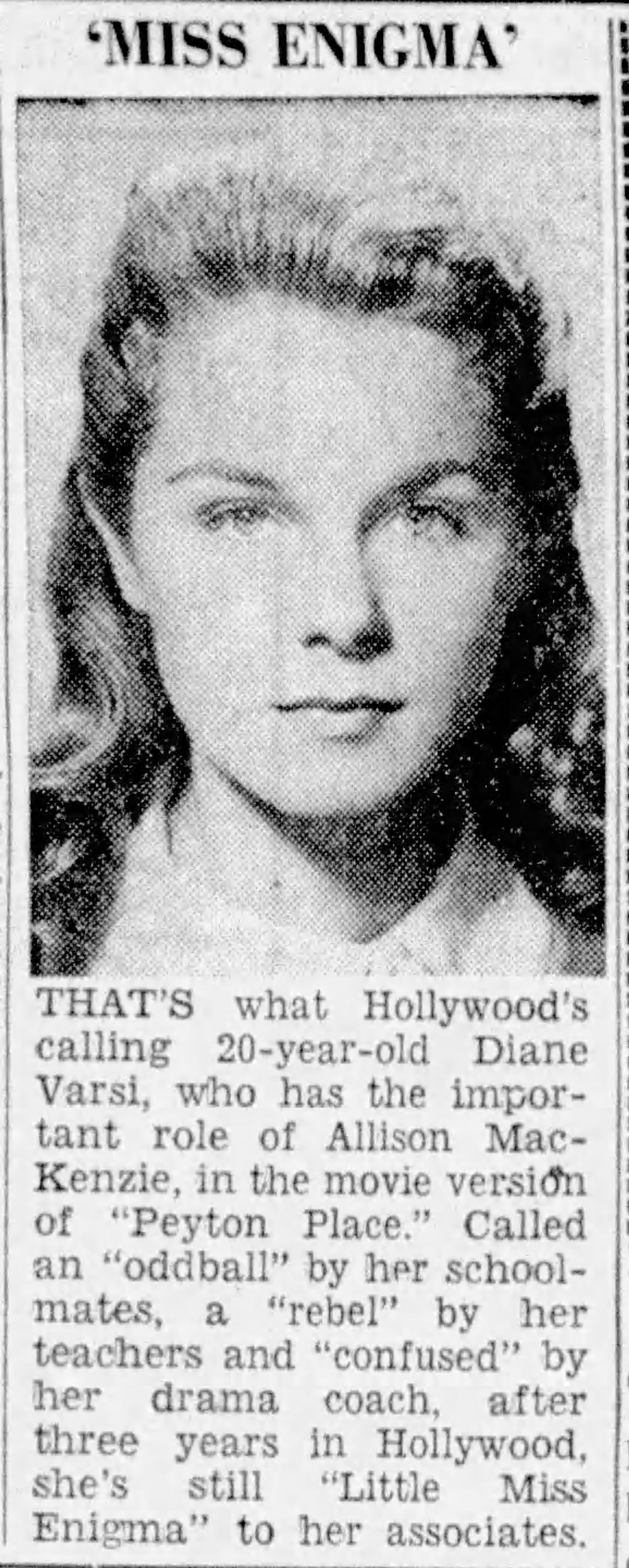
Newspaper clipping, December 23, 1957

Varsi rejected the role of Meg in the comedy film Holiday for Lovers in January 1959. On March 18, 1959, she suddenly left Hollywood, abandoning her contract. "I'm running away from destruction," she explained, saying it concerned other people, as well. A week later she elaborated, "Hollywood is too impressed with superficial cheapness." Nevertheless, her contract with Fox did not expire until 1965. Her sudden walkout was for a long time rumored to be a publicity stunt to promote the sequel to Peyton Place, Return to Peyton Place (1961), to which Varsi was attached.

By walking out of her contract, Varsi's inclusion in plans for several films was cancelled, including a starring role in The Best of Everything (1959). After leaving Hollywood, Varsi participated in local San Francisco theater productions. At some point thereafter, she made her way to New York long enough to successfully audition for the Actors Studio, which she would attend at least briefly in 1965. Varsi returned to film acting in the late 1960s, but by this time she was no longer offered major roles and subsequently referred to the movies she made in this period as "cheap films of little merit". Although producers were curious about her, she said, they would not hire her. Her later films include the influential cult film Wild in the Streets (1968); Johnny Got His Gun (1971), which Varsi described as her favorite; and an ABC Movie of the Week, titled The People (1972). In 1970, she was a supporting actress to Shelley Winters in Bloody Mama; Robert DeNiro also appeared in the film as one of Ma Barker's sons. Of Johnny Got His Gun, the actress said: "This is the kind of thing I always wanted to do. It comes very late to me. It's been a long time to wait." She was apprehensive about playing the role, saying: "I felt too inadequate to do [Johnny Got His Gun]. It's so intense, the responsibility."

== Personal life ==
While in Hollywood, Varsi was known for being unglamorous, wearing no makeup or expensive clothes. She avoided Hollywood parties and was quoted as saying: "I'd rather meet Aldous Huxley than Clark Gable." Her fellow Fox actors remembered her as "a frightened, birdlike girl who was bewildered by her sudden success" and as "disillusioned by the way certain studio officials treated her". She dated Russ Tamblyn, her co-star in Peyton Place, following the film's release.

From November 26, 1956, to August 29, 1958, Varsi was married to James Dickson, whom she made her manager while working as an actress. She then married Michael Hausman on May 21, 1961; they had a daughter, Willo.

== Death ==
On November 19, 1992 in Los Angeles, Varsi died of respiratory failure at the age of 54. She also suffered from Lyme disease. She is buried at Mount Tamalpais Cemetery in San Rafael, California.

== Filmography ==
Film
Year	Title	Role	Notes
1957	Peyton Place	Allison MacKenzie	
1958	Ten North Frederick	Ann Chapin	
1958	From Hell to Texas	Juanita Bradley	alternative title: Man Hunt
1959	Compulsion	Ruth Evans	
1967	Sweet Love Bitter	Della	alternative titles: Black Love, White Love; It Won't Rub Off, Baby!
1967	Roseanna	Mary Jane	
1968	Wild in the Streets	Sally LeRoy	
1968	Killers Three	Carol Warder	
1970	Bloody Mama	Mona Gibson	
1971	Johnny Got His Gun	Fourth Nurse	
1977	I Never Promised You a Rose Garden	Sylvia	
Television
Year	Title	Role	Notes
1959	Playhouse 90	Lurene Dawson	S3.E21: "The Ding-A-Ling Girl"
1966	Dr. Kildare	Nurse Claire Hanson	2 episodes
1969	My Friend Tony	Iris	S1.E12: "Computer Murder"
1971	Cannon	Mrs. Hill	S1.E4: "Country Blues"
1972	The People	Valancy Carmody	ABC Movie of the Week

== Awards and nominations ==
Year	Award	Result	Category	Work
1958	Academy Award	Nominated	Best Actress in a Supporting Role	Peyton Place
1958	Golden Globe Award	Won	Most Promising Newcomer - Actress	—N/a
1958	Laurel Awards	Nominated	Top New Female Personality	—N/a
1958	Laurel Awards	Nominated	Top Female Supporting Performance	Peyton Place
