= The Hell Bent Kid =

1957 American Western novel

- Author: Charles O. Locke
- Language: English
- Genre: Western
- Set in: 1880s, Texas and New Mexico
- Publisher: Norton, Open Road Media
- Publication date: 1957
- Publication place: USA
- ISBN: 978-1504053327 (2018 Open Road Media edition)

The Hell Bent Kid is a 1957 American Western novel by Charles O. Locke.

The protagonist of the book is Tot Lohman, the eponymous Hell Bent Kid a mild mannered teenager but a crack shot. Lohman shoots dead a man from the Boyd family in self defense, and the vicious and numerous Boyd family is set on revenge. Lohman flees to New Mexico Territory to seek his father. The journey, across desert canyon country and pursued by the Boyds, is arduous and dangerous. Lohman finds his father hanged, and turns to face – and kill – his pursuers. His desert journey is mirrored in his internal journey of conscience as he is turned by necessity into a cold-blooded killer.

The Hell Bent Kid was selected by the Western Writers of America as one of the twenty-five best Western novels ever written. It was adapted into the 1958 movie From Hell to Texas.

== Point-of-view & Structure ==
The story is mostly told from a first-person point-of-view, that of Tate "Tot" Lohman's.

However, the story begins with a "statement" by Henry Restow, a character in the novel, which is chapter 1. Chapter 8 is a letter from Amos Bradley to Henry Restow. Chapter 19 consists of two letters from Restow to Bradley, and one letter from Bradley to Restow.

Chapter 20 is a statement by Amos Bradley, which he concludes by quoting a letter by Tot in its entirety.

== Characters ==
Tate "Tot" Lohman

The main character, an eighteen-year-old young man.

Charles Edward Lohman

Tot's father, formerly a sheriff, but as the story opens he is in poor health and employed as a cook for a British rancher in Socorro, New Mexico (not to be confused with Socorro, Texas; in chapter 8, Amos says, "...the towns you will want to avoid—like Springer and Maxwell—they are far to the west from where I am aiming to send you.").

Harley Lohman

Tot's older brother.

Amos Bradley

A ranch-owner from Santa Rosa, New Mexico with seven daughters who befriends Tot.

Juanita "Nita" Bradley

One of Amos's daughters. She is adopted.

Hunter "Old Man" Boyd

The patriarch of the Boyd family and the antagonist, or villain, of the story.

Shorty Boyd

One of Hunter's sons, killed by Tot before the novel begins.

Otis and Tom Boyd

Two more of Hunter's sons.

Hal Carmody

Assistant foreman for Hunter Boyd.

Henry Restow

A ranch-owner who employs and has sympathy for Tot.

Henry Bawbeen

A French sheepherder and wolf-trapper.

Jake Leffertfinger

A freighter that Tot had talked to in the town of Twist before the novel begins, a friend of Tot's.

Gerard

A British ranch-owner of the T Cross T, suspected of cattle-thieving, employs Tot's father as cook.

Edward Hoffman

Similar size and age as Tot, Ed poses as him en route to Socorro.

== Notes ==
1. "Hell bent" is an English idiom meaning "ruthlessly determined".
