= Scribblings =

1972 collection of writings by L. Sprague de Camp

- first edition of Scribblings
- Author: L. Sprague de Camp
- Cover artist: M.H. Keith
- Language: English
- Genre: Science fiction
- Publisher: NESFA Press
- Publication date: 1972
- Publication place: United States
- Media type: Print (hardback)
- Pages: 95 pp

Scribblings is a 1972 collection of writings by American author L. Sprague de Camp to celebrate his appearance as Guest of Honor at Boskone IX, a convention sponsored by the New England Science Fiction Association. The Association served as publisher.

The book contains short works of fiction, poetry, non-fiction, and aphorisms. Among the stories are the complete set of de Camp's four short "Drinkwhiskey Institute" series of tall tales.

== Contents ==
- "A Word of Explanation" (introduction)
- Probability Zero
  - "The Effects of Time Travel" (story in the "Drinkwhiskey Institute" series)
  - "The Negative Wugug" (story in the "Drinkwhiskey Institute" series)
  - "The Moveable Ears" (story in the "Drinkwhiskey Institute" series)
  - "The Lusts of Professor Adams" (story in the "Drinkwhiskey Institute" series)
- Jingles
  - "Preferences" (poem)
  - "Carnac" (poem)
  - "The Elephant" (poem)
  - "Leaves" (poem)
  - "The Trap" (poem)
  - "The Newt" (poem)
  - "African Night" (poem)
  - "A Night Club in Cairo" (poem)
  - "Xeroxing the Necromonicon" (poem)
- It Might Interest You to Know
  - "How to Hunt Dinosaurs" (essay)
  - "Pfui on Psi" (essay on psychic powers)
  - "Lost Cities" (essay)
  - "Government Bug-Hunter" (essay on Clinton Hart Merriam)
  - "Three Thirds of a Hero" (poem)
  - "Books That Never Were" (essay on lost and imaginary books)
- "Aphorisms" (aphorisms)
