= Silverlock =

1949 novel by John Myers Myers

- First edition cover
- Author: John Myers Myers
- Language: English
- Genre: Fantasy novel
- Publisher: E. P. Dutton
- Publication date: 1949
- Publication place: United States
- Media type: Print (Hardback & Paperback)
- Pages: 349

Silverlock is a novel by John Myers Myers published in 1949. The novel's settings and characters, aside from the protagonist, are all drawn from history, mythology, and other works of literature.

In 1981, The Moon's Fire-Eating Daughter was published. Thematically related to Silverlock, it was billed as a "sequel to Silverlock" on the cover.

== Plot summary ==
While on a sea voyage, a ship named Naglfar founders. One anhedonic passenger, A. Clarence Shandon (M.B.A., Wisconsin), is washed ashore in a fictional land known as "The Commonwealth of Letters". He is befriended by Golias, who nicknames him "Silverlock" and who becomes his guide. Silverlock and Golias encounter figures from history, literature and mythology.

== Characters ==
This is a partial listing of the characters, settings, and events that are drawn from history, and from works of literature and mythology. Some of the characters go by names other than those given below, thus the reader is expected to identify them from their contexts.

- Golias. His name is that of a mythical patron saint of wandering bards. He is also identified as Orpheus, Taliesin, Amergin, Virgil, and other wandering poets.
- Lucius Gil Jones, a composite of Lucius in The Golden Ass by Apuleius, Gil Blas in Gil Blas by Alain-René Lesage, and Tom Jones in The History of Tom Jones, a Foundling by Henry Fielding
- Robin Hood, legendary figure
- Job, character from the Bible
- Faust, from Goethe's play
- Pathfinder from James Fenimore Cooper's 1826 novel The Last of the Mohicans
- Don Quixote and his squire, Sancho Panza
- Daniel Boone, American explorer
- Puck, character from Shakespeare's A Midsummer Night's Dream
- Beowulf, mythical hero
- Manon Lescaut, from the novel L'Histoire du chevalier des Grieux et de Manon Lescaut and the opera Manon Lescaut
- Becky Sharp (Becky Crawley) from Thackeray's Vanity Fair
- Emma Watson, from the novel fragment The Watsons, by Jane Austen
- Izaak Walton, English novelist, as "Piscator"
- The Mad Hatter, the March Hare, and the Dormouse from Lewis Carroll's 1865 novel Alice in Wonderland
- The Green Knight from Sir Gawain and the Green Knight
- Ship of fools, a medieval European cultural phenomenon
- Hamlet, from Shakespeare's play of the same name
- Oedipus, the mythological Greek hero
- Brian Boru, High King of Ireland
- Aeacus, Minos, and Rhadamanthus were the judges of the dead in Hades in Greek mythology.

== Literary significance and criticism ==
John Myers Myers is remembered [largely] for SILVERLOCK, a recursive fantasy that centres on a picaresque voyage by a shipwrecked protagonist through the 'Commonwealth' (of literature), where he encounters numerous characters and situations from world literature and mythology – the Ass of Apuleius, Beowulf, the Green Knight, Robin Hood, Dante's Hell, Friar John from RABELAIS, and many more. The novel is light and pleasant, rather in the manner of Christopher Morley...

— Grant

Gulliverian fantasy in which a castaway is washed up on the shore of the Commonwealth, where all the great characters of literature are to be found; the hapless hero wanders around, repeatedly getting himself into difficulties and finding famous rescuers, eventually cultivating a kind of heroism. An amusing exercise in literary game playing...

— Barron

Journeys of self-discovery appear in every genre, teaching us about the main character as well as ourselves. The journey takes many forms: Gilgamesh searching for immortality; Dante's trips to Heaven, Hell, and Purgatory; and Wyatt and Billy's road trip in Easy Rider, among many others. These voyages speak to human beings' desire to answer fundamental questions about their place in the world. John Myers Myers takes a novel approach to this genre in Silverlock. His main character learns about himself by participating in the lives of other literary figures.

— Eller

== Release details ==
- 1949, US, E. P. Dutton, 1949, hardback (first edition)
- 1966, US, Ace Books, mass market paperback
- 1979, US, Ace Books, ISBN 0-441-76671-4, second printing
- 1982, US, Ace Books, ISBN 0-441-76673-0,
- 1992, US, Buccaneer Books, ISBN 0-89968-409-2, hardback
- 1996, US, Ace Books, ISBN 0-441-76674-9, paperback
- 2004, US, NESFA Press, ISBN 1-886778-52-3 hardback, with "Silverlock Companion"
- 2005, US, Ace Books, ISBN 0-441-01247-7, trade paperback

A Silverlock Companion: the life and works of John Myers Myers, edited by Fred Lerner, is a 52-page pamphlet published 1988 OCLC 22760287 and reprinted as a book 1989 OCLC 19352130.
