= Falling Free =

1988 science fiction novel by Lois McMaster Bujold

- First edition
- Author: Lois McMaster Bujold
- Audio read by: Grover Gardner
- Cover artist: Alan Gutierrez
- Language: English
- Series: Vorkosigan Saga
- Genre: Science fiction
- Publisher: Baen Books
- Publication date: April 1988
- Publication place: United States
- Media type: Paperback
- Pages: 307
- Awards: 2014 Prometheus Hall of Fame, 1988 Nebula Award for Best Novel
- ISBN: 0-671-65398-9
- Preceded by: Ethan of Athos
- Followed by: Brothers in Arms

External image
- Analog, FEB 1988, cover art by Vincent Di Fate

Falling Free is a science fiction novel by American writer Lois McMaster Bujold, part of her Vorkosigan Saga. It was first published as four installments in Analog from December 1987 to February 1988, and was included in the 2007 omnibus Miles, Mutants and Microbes.

== Plot summary ==
The novel is set about 200 years before the birth of Miles Vorkosigan, the protagonist of much of the Vorkosigan series. It deals with the "Quaddies", genetically modified people who have four arms, the second pair situated where legs would normally go. They were intended to be used as a space labor force, superbly adapted to zero-gravity work (where legs would be merely a hindrance). They would not require the special facilities or mandatory time off needed by unmodified humans, whose bodies tend to deteriorate over the long term in weightlessness, and would thus be more efficient (and profitable) for the company that created them.

Legally, the Quaddies are not considered human beings, with their attendant rights, but simply "post-fetal experimental tissue cultures". The company treats them as chattel slaves. They are carefully indoctrinated from childhood to be loyal to the company, and their access to information is tightly controlled; even their children's stories are about working in space. They are the subject of a breeding program, the company choosing who will mate with whom.

Then a new artificial gravity technology renders the Quaddies obsolete practically overnight and a financial drain to the company. Though there are discussions about liquidating them, a powerful company higher-up decides to simply dump them on the planet in an isolated camp as the most cost-effective solution. Bipedal engineer Leo Graf, who had been assigned to teach them construction techniques, instead organizes them for a mass escape to a remote star system.

Bujold has stated in the notes of her reprints that Falling Free was the first half of the intended story. The unwritten, second story was to tell how the Quaddies settled into what would be known as "Quaddiespace". Diplomatic Immunity, published in 2002, revisits the Quaddies in their home system, showing the state of their society some 240 years after its foundation.

== Characters ==
- Leo Graf – a genetically unmodified human engineer, he is based on the author's father, Robert Charles McMaster (1913–1986). He is hired to train the Quaddies in space-engineering practices. Graf is unaware of the nature of the Quaddies until he arrives at the station. He becomes sympathetic to their plight, and when he learns of the company's plans for them in the wake of the new artificial gravity technologies, he works out plans for their escape.
- Silver – a young female Quaddie who is instrumental in assisting Leo Graf in the escape. They later fall in love.
- Bruce Van Atta - Leo's boss, the executive in charge of the project and the primary villain. He views the Quaddies as merely a stepping stone for his rise in the company.

== Reception ==
Falling Free won the 1988 Nebula Award for Best Novel.

At Reactor, Jo Walton described it as "a very traditional science fiction book in many ways—the best bit is the science," noting that she did not find the romance between Silver and Leo to be "very convincing", and stated that as the book is one of Bujold's earlier works, it is less "technically accomplished" and "definitely (...) minor", but emphasized that minor for Bujold would be major for other writers. The SF Site similarly observed the "general lack of subtlety and finesse that [Bujold] would later develop" and the "rather shallow" characterization, particularly faulting Bruce Van Atta as "just so unrelievedly nasty about everything that it was hard to take him seriously as a threat, because I couldn't imagine Bujold letting him win", but nonetheless praised its "lively dialogue and bright spots of wit".
