= Harry Warner Jr. =

American writer (1922–2003)

- Born: December 19, 1922; Chambersburg, Pennsylvania, U.S.
- Died: February 17, 2003 (aged 80); Hagerstown, Maryland, U.S.
- Education: Autodidact
- Alma mater: Hagerstown High School
- Occupations: Journalist, historian, science fiction writer
- Writing career
- Period: 1938–2003
- Genres: Journalism, science fiction fandom
- Subjects: History, fandom
- Notable works: All Our Yesterdays; A Wealth of Fable; Spaceways; Horizons
- Notable awards: Hugo Awards (1969, 1972, 1993), First Fandom Hall of Fame award, Washington County, Maryland, Historical Preservation Award

Harry Warner Jr. (December 19, 1922 – February 17, 2003) was an American journalist. He spent 40 years working for the Hagerstown, Maryland, Herald-Mail.

He was also an important science fiction fan and historian of fandom and Washington County, Maryland, as well as a classical musician.

== Biography ==
Warner was born in 1922 in Chambersburg, Pennsylvania. Due to poor health, he dropped out of Hagerstown High School by the 10th grade.

Despite his lack of formal education, he was a well-read and learned man, an autodidact who taught himself seven languages. During World War II, he translated letters from overseas to families of American soldiers.

Warner never married. On his death, he left most of his possessions to a Hagerstown Lutheran church.

=== Career ===
Warner started as a reporter at The Herald-Mail on May 17, 1943, covering governmental agencies and the farming community, along with obituaries and general news. A rapid typist and fast writer, Warner would often begin composing his stories while taking down information from sources. He also excelled at page layouts and writing headlines, and took a weekly stint as editor in charge. "He was amazing," a colleague, Gloria Dahlhamer, recalled.

A lover of classical music, who played the piano and oboe in local recitals and on radio, he became the paper's classical music critic. He also wrote a column focusing on local history and served as the media representative on the Washington County government's Historical Advisory Committee; he received the county's Historical Preservation Award for 1982.

He retired in 1983.

=== Science fiction fandom ===
Warner became active in science fiction fandom in 1936, although he was extremely reclusive, earning the nickname "The Hermit of Hagerstown" by the 1950s. He rigidly kept his professional life in Hagerstown and his science fiction world separate, and few people in his hometown knew of his science fiction activities until after his death. He hated to travel, and almost never attended science fiction conventions. Although in the 1930s he welcomed such visitors as Frederik Pohl, Jack Speer, Wilson "Bob" Tucker, Milt Rothman and Russ Chauvenet, ultimately, he discouraged the visits from other fans.

In 1938, he published the first issue of Spaceways, one of the most important science fiction fanzines of its period, and beginning in 1939, supplemented it with Horizons, which was for decades a mainstay of the Fantasy Amateur Press Association. Horizons had its first issue in October 1939 and its 252nd and final issue in February 2003. He also wrote prolifically for other zines. He won Hugo Awards for Best Fan Writer in 1969 and 1972.

Warner was known for his letter writing. His mailing address at 423 Summit Avenue, Hagerstown was well known by fanzine fans. Warner would answer to most letters sent to him with a two-page letter. Editors have described getting their first letter from Warner as a rite of passage. Using a manual typewriter, Warner wrote tens of thousands of letters commenting on fanzines.

Warner was sent free copies of every issue by nearly every fanzine publisher in the country due to his reputation within the community.

Film critic and one-time fan Roger Ebert wrote: "Locs (letters of comment) were the currency of payment for fanzine contributors; you wrote, and in the next issue got to read about what you had written. Today I can see my name on a full-page ad for a movie with disinterest, but what Harry Warner or Buck Coulson had to say about me — well, that was important."

Warner was announced as associate editor of the professional science fiction magazine Odd Tales in the 1940s.; however this was revealed to be a hoax by Warner and Julius Unger. In the 1950s, he tried his hand at science fiction itself, publishing a few short stories in various magazines, such as "Rattle OK" in the December 1956 Galaxy.

He was the fan guest of honor at the 1971 World Science Fiction Convention, a tribute he accepted with reluctance.

In 1995, Warner received the First Fandom Hall of Fame award. He remained active in fanzine fandom until the end of his life.

==== Histories ====
Warner wrote two book-length histories of fandom, essential references in the field: All Our Yesterdays (ISBN 1-886778-13-2), covering the 1940s, first published in 1969, and A Wealth of Fable (ISBN 0-9633-099-0-0), covering the 1950s, first published in 1977. The second book's expanded edition won the Hugo Award in 1993 for Best Related Book. "All Our Yesterdays" was also the title of a series of historical columns Warner wrote.
