= Wondrous Beginnings =

2003 science fiction book

- Editors: Steven H. Silver; Martin H. Greenberg
- Language: English language
- Series: Beginnings
- Genre: Science fiction
- Publisher: DAW Books
- Publication date: 2003
- Publication place: United States
- Media type: Print (paperback)
- Pages: 316
- ISBN: 0-7564-0098-8
- Followed by: Magical Beginnings

Wondrous Beginnings is an anthology of science fiction short stories edited by Steven H. Silver and Martin H. Greenberg, first published in paperback by DAW Books in January 2003. It is a compilation of the first published stories of seventeen prominent authors in the genre, and features introductions to the stories provided (in most instances) by the authors of those stories. Wondrous Beginnings was the first of three similarly-themed anthologies, its companions being Magical Beginnings and Horrible Beginnings, compiling the first published stories of authors writing in the fantasy and horror genres, respectively. The book follows the example of the earlier First Flight: Maiden Voyages in Space and Time, edited by Damon Knight (Lancer Books, 1963) and First Voyages, edited by Damon Knight, Martin H. Greenberg and Joseph D. Olander (Avon Books, 1981). which did not include individual introductions. The content of Wondrous Beginnings has little overlap in content with these earlier anthologies, however, as only the stories by de Camp, Clement and Clarke are repeated from them.

== Contents ==
- "Introduction" (Steven H Silver)
- "Introduction to 'The Runaway Skyscraper'" (Betty Dehardit)
- "The Runaway Skyscraper" (1919) (Murray Leinster)
- "Introduction to 'The Isolinguals'" (L. Sprague de Camp)
- "The Isolinguals" (1937) (L. Sprague de Camp)
- "Introduction to 'Freedom of the Race'" (Anne McCaffrey)
- "Freedom of the Race" (1953) (Anne McCaffrey)
- "About 'Proof,' of Course" (Hal Clement)
- "Proof" (1942) (Hal Clement)
- "Introduction to 'Loophole'" (Arthur C. Clarke)
- "Loophole" (1946) (Arthur C. Clarke)
- "Deadeye: Writing 'The Dead Man'" (Gene Wolfe)
- "The Dead Man" (1965) (Gene Wolfe)
- "Introduction to 'We're Coming Through the Window'" (Barry N. Malzberg)
- "We're Coming Through the Window" (1967) (Barry N. Malzberg)
- "Introduction to 'The Hero'" (George R. R. Martin)
- "The Hero" (1971) (George R. R. Martin)
- "My (Other) World and Welcome to it: Writing 'Lunchbox'" (Howard Waldrop)
- "Lunchbox" (1972) (Howard Waldrop)
- "The Origin of 'Ender's Game'" (Orson Scott Card)
- "Ender's Game" (1977) (Orson Scott Card)
- "Introduction to 'The Emerson Effect'" (Jack McDevitt)
- "The Emerson Effect" (1981) (Jack McDevitt)
- "The Writing of 'Much Ado About Nothing'" (Jerry Oltion)
- "Much Ado About Nothing" (1982) (Jerry Oltion)
- "Introduction to 'Barter'" (Lois McMaster Bujold)
- "Barter" (1985) (Lois McMaster Bujold)
- "Introduction to 'The Xeelee Flower'" (Stephen Baxter)
- "The Xeelee Flower" (1987) (Stephen Baxter)
- "Introduction to 'Dance in Blue'" (Catherine Asaro)
- "Dance in Blue" (1993) (Catherine Asaro)
- "Introduction to 'TeleAbsence'" (Michael A. Burstein)
- "TeleAbsence" (1995) (Michael A. Burstein)
- "Introduction to 'First Contact Inc.'" (Julie E. Czerneda)
- "First Contact Inc." (1997) (Julie E. Czerneda)
- "About the Authors"
