= Horrible Beginnings =

- Editors: Steven H. Silver; Martin H. Greenberg
- Language: English
- Series: Beginnings
- Genre: Horror
- Publisher: DAW Books
- Publication date: 2003
- Publication place: United States
- Media type: Print (paperback)
- Pages: 320
- ISBN: 0-7564-0123-2
- Preceded by: Magical Beginnings

Horrible Beginnings is an anthology of horror short stories edited by Steven H. Silver and Martin H. Greenberg, first published in paperback by DAW Books in March 2003. The cover art is based on Children of Bodom's debut album, Something Wild. It is a compilation of the first published stories of seventeen authors in the genre, and features introductions to the stories provided (in most instances) by the authors of those stories. Horrible Beginnings was the third and last of three similarly-themed anthologies, its companions being Wondrous Beginnings and Magical Beginnings, compiling the first published stories of authors writing in the science fiction and fantasy genres, respectively. The series follows the example of the earlier First Flight: Maiden Voyages in Space and Time, edited by Damon Knight (Lancer Books, 1963) and First Voyages, edited by Damon Knight, Martin H. Greenberg and Joseph D. Olander (Avon Books, 1981), which focused on science fiction authors only and did not include individual introductions.

== Contents ==
- "Introduction" (Steven H Silver)
- "Introduction to 'Lilies'" (Stefan R. Dziemianowicz)
- "Lilies" (1934) (Robert Bloch)
- "Introduction to 'The Graveyard Rats'" (Frederik Pohl)
- "The Graveyard Rats" (1936) (Henry Kuttner)
- "Introduction to 'The Church in High Street'" (Ramsey Campbell)
- "The Church in High Street" (1962) (Ramsey Campbell)
- "Introduction to 'Eustace'" (Tanith Lee)
- "Eustace" (1968) (Tanith Lee)
- "First Gear" (Edward Bryant)
- "They Only Come in Dreams" (1970) (Edward Bryant)
- "Introduction to 'The Cleaning Machine'" (F. Paul Wilson)
- "The Cleaning Machine" (1971) (F. Paul Wilson)
- "Introduction to 'Agony in the Garden'" (Thomas F. Monteleone)
- "Agony in the Garden" (1973) (Thomas F. Monteleone)
- "Introduction to 'The Case of Four and Twenty Blackbirds'" (Neil Gaiman)
- "The Case of the Four and Twenty Blackbirds" (1984) (Neil Gaiman)
- "Surprise Fall: Revisited" (Yvonne Navarro)
- "Surprise Fall" (1984) (Yvonne Navarro)
- "Introduction to 'Dreamers'" (Kim Newman)
- "Dreamers" (1984) (Kim Newman)
- "A Few Words on "Optional Music for Voice and Piano'" (Poppy Z. Brite)
- "Optional Music for Voice and Piano" (1986) (Poppy Z. Brite)
- "Introduction to 'Amymone's Footsteps'" (Gary A. Braunbeck)
- "Amymone's Footsteps" (1986) (Gary A. Braunbeck)
- "Introduction to 'Colt.24'" (Rick Hautala)
- "Colt .24" (1987) (Rick Hautala)
- "Introduction to 'Prince of Flowers'" (Elizabeth Hand)
- "Prince of Flowers" (1988) (Elizabeth Hand)
- "From a Distance" (Kathe Koja)
- "Distances" (1988) (Kathe Koja)
- "Introduction to 'The Wind Breathes Cold'" (P. N. Elrod)
- "The Wind Breathes Cold" (1992) (P. N. Elrod)
- "Introduction to 'Deep Sleep'" (Matthew Costello)
- "Deep Sleep" (1992) (Matthew Costello)
