= Years in the Making =

Years in the Making may refer to:

- Years in the Making (album), a 2018 compilation album by Loudon Wainwright III
- Years in the Making: The Time-Travel Stories of L. Sprague de Camp, a 2005 collection of science fiction stories by L. Sprague de Camp
