= Dumarest saga =

Science fiction novels by Edwin Charles Tubb

The series started with The Winds of Gath which was published as an Ace Double in 1967, bound back to back with Crisis on Cheiron by Juanita Coulson

Dumarest of Terra is a 33-volume series of science fiction novels by Edwin Charles Tubb. Each story is a self-contained adventure, but throughout the series, Earl Dumarest, the protagonist, searches for clues to the location of his home world, Earth.

The stories are set in a far future galactic culture that is fragmented and without any central government. Dumarest was born on Earth, but had stowed away on a spaceship when he was a young boy and was caught. Although a stowaway discovered on a spaceship was typically ejected to space, the captain took pity on the boy and allowed him to work and travel on the ship. When the story opens in The Winds of Gath, Dumarest has traveled so long and so far that he does not know how to return to his home planet and no-one has ever heard of it, other than as a myth or legend.

It becomes clear that someone or something has deliberately concealed Earth's location. The Cyclan, an organization of humans surgically altered to be emotionless (known as Cybers), and on occasion able to link with the brains of previously living Cybers (the better to think logically), seem determined to stop him from finding Earth. Additionally, the Cyclan seeks a scientific discovery that Dumarest possesses, stolen from them and passed to him by a dying thief, which would vastly increase their already considerable power.

Also appearing in many of the books is the humanitarian Church of Universal Brotherhood. Its monks are spread throughout many worlds as are the Cyclan, the two being arch-enemies—which does not make the Church Dumarest's ally, but in some instances they support each other.

== Characters ==
Earl Dumarest, the protagonist of the series, is a galactic adventurer, sometime bodyguard, mercenary, gladiator, prospector, hunter, gambler and starship jack of all trades. Dumarest, as he is most often referred to in the books, is on a quest to return to the lost planet of his birth amongst the diverse and disparate worlds of the milky way galaxy. His home planet is Earth. In all of the books the notion of there being a planet called Earth is laughable to most of the people he meets, and for those who have heard the name, it is only as a myth from the deep past often referred to alongside gamblers' paradises such as Jackpot, Bonanza and the mythical El Dorado.

== Factions ==
=== Cyclan ===
The Cyclan are a widespread organization dedicated to bringing order to the galaxy by means of pure logic. Their primary agents, Cybers, are trained from childhood in countless mental disciplines involving mathematics and reasoning, and are modified at puberty to be unable to experience any emotion. Each Cyber also possesses a biotech implant called "Homochon Elements". These implants enable each Cyber to enter a trance-like state which enables instantaneous communication with the Cyclan central intelligence, even over interstellar distances. This central intelligence is a gestalt organism consisting of the disembodied minds of former Cybers whose mental prowess has been demonstrated to be of value but whose bodies have grown too old to continue functioning. The ultimate reward to which all Cybers aspire is to be incorporated into the central intelligence.

For these reasons, Cybers have an uncanny ability to extrapolate future events from existing data, and are highly prized (and highly paid) as advisors to rulers across the galaxy. The Cyclan publicly insist that they do not command or interfere, they merely advise, and this also increases their credibility among those who seek their service. However, the Cyclan pursue their own agenda, and while they provide valuable service to maintain their reputation, those whom they advise are manipulated even as they are aided. While incapable of malice, the Cyclan are thoroughly ruthless and willing to sacrifice individuals or worlds to their logically derived vision of the greater good. It is irrelevant to them whether or not the mass of humanity still handicapped by emotion shares this vision.

It is implied throughout the series that the Cyclan has something to do with the knowledge of Earth having been lost or destroyed in the distant past, and that they strive to keep that knowledge secret. This hidden agenda puts them at odds with Dumarest from the outset of the series.

=== Hausia ===
The Hausia is a network of information brokers who operate on most worlds that engage in interstellar commerce. With a galactic reputation as fair but shrewd negotiators, and consistently driven by the profit motive, Hausi are neither noble nor malicious. Dumarest frequently deals with them because, as long as a mutually beneficial business arrangement can be reached, their lack of a hidden agenda makes them predictable and generally trustworthy.

=== Church of Universal Brotherhood ===
The Church of Universal Brotherhood is a decentralized humanitarian organization whose "monks" roam the galaxy giving comfort and alleviating suffering wherever they can. While they do not believe suffering holds intrinsic merit, they refuse to enjoy luxury or privilege of station above what is available to the most lowly of those to whom they minister. Although this appearance is not intended to deceive, it occasionally blinds those who disparage or underestimate them to the fact that each monk is a highly educated, highly trained agent of the central Church.

=== Free Traders ===
The Free Traders are small, independently owned and operated merchant starships and their crews. Free traders often invest speculatively in their cargoes in the hope of finding a lucrative market, or carry commissioned cargo and paying passengers when available.

=== Terridae ===
The Terridae is a secretive and paranoid sect that shares Dumarest’s mission: to find Earth. They have been awaiting "The Event" (the discovery of Earth) for thousands of years. As they age, they spend more and more of their lives in self-contained stasis chambers (caskets) - the oldest only awakening for short periods every few decades, to prolong their lifespan until The Event occurs.

=== Original People ===
The Original People is a mysterious and highly fragmented sect that believes all humanity originated on one world - Earth (also known as Terra). Each faction is highly secretive and does not proselytize, because membership is based on the belief that they are the descendants of the original wave of settlers that spread out into the galaxy from Earth.

== Books ==
The series consists of:

1. The Winds of Gath (1967). Gath is a world with a unique tourist attraction: a mountain-sized white noise amplifier. With no indigenous economy other than the tourist slave labor trade, Dumarest struggles to break free from this dead-end world. Dumarest becomes attached to the retinue of the Matriarch of Kund and unwittingly finds himself embroiled in the vicious and complex political intrigues of the Matriarch's court. After some keen detective work from Dumarest and the ensuing deadly battle with the Cyclan, Dumarest prevails and escapes from the backwater planet.
2. Derai (1968) Dumarest is recruited to escort a waif of a woman lost on an unfamiliar world back to her home and family. Upon delivery he is recruited to assist the family further by participating in a trial to benefit their patriarch. The waif is the Lady Derai, heiress to a noble house, and they are able to succeed due to special circumstances relating to Derai. In the end, he is confronted with a member of the Cyclan once again and his victory is tainted by sacrifice.
3. Toyman (1969)
4. Kalin (1969): This opens with a damsel in distress, falsely accused, and possessing a strategic ability. Dumarest and Kalin couple and encounter a number of trials landing them in a dead end world. Her powers overcome some obstacles and combined with his sense of survival they are able to escape the debt trap planet. The completion of the journey is also a return to her family's world, where the Cyclan are pressing their influence as well. Experiencing another loss, Dumarest also gains a gift that makes him a target of a powerful organization.
5. The Jester at Scar (1970) Dumarest finds himself on a planet with an economy based on transient labor harvesting spores of fungi valuable for different properties, which grow abundantly on a planet with rapid seasons. He must survive the natural hazards of the monsoon season, and prepare for the hazards of the harvest as many of the fungi are dangerous to lethal. Ultimately he is given a task, by the "Jester", that wins him freedom but costs him the fruits of his labor. He also confronts a Cyclan because they have become nemeses by this point in the saga. Dumarest's red ring is mentioned repeatedly in this novel.
6. Lallia (1971): Dumarest is searching for old charts, and takes passage as a cargo handler on a run-down old trading ship. The dynamics of the flawed men forming the crew are well-described. An agent of the Cyclan confronts Dumarest, and indirectly this reveals a secret property of Dumarest's ring. Dumarest is healed by an alien ship or device, which gives him a vision showing where Earth is located.
7. Technos (1972)
8. Veruchia (1973)
9. Mayenne (1973)
10. Jondelle (1973; also published as Mayenne and Jondelle (1981))
11. Zenya (1974)
12. Eloise (1975)
13. Eye of the Zodiac (1975)
14. Jack of Swords (1976): Dumerest is coerced into joining a crew of a starship searching for a lost planet by a devious benefactor. Eager to find clues for Earth and stay one step ahead of the Cyclan, he joins the mission, but they must free a girl with mysterious talents to lead them on their perilous journey.
15. Spectrum of a Forgotten Sun (1976): Captured whilst a mercenary on a plague-ridden world, Dumarest is forced by a young noblewoman into being part of heist to steal goods for off planet sale, when the heist goes wrong and plague hits the ship, Dumarest succumbs only to recover and find he is betrothed to the noblewoman on a world where tradition and honour rule, but also one that may provide more clues as to the whereabouts of Earth.
16. Haven of Darkness (1977)
17. Prison of Night (1977)
18. Incident on Ath (1978): A world with a name similar to "Earth" draws Earl to a planet ruled by a complacent and bored artistic elite who rule over a subservient class.
19. The Quillian Sector (1978)
20. Web of Sand (1979): Dumarest and a number of other travellers are stranded on planet with a debt based economy. They first try to utilize their various talents to free them from the trap, and despite failure they earn a degree of patronage. Dumarest must lead the group in a life-threatening expedition to earn their freedom.
21. Iduna's Universe (1979): Dumarest must enter the mind of a comatose woman who has been catatonic since she was a child. He must battle her wits in a universe she controls in order to free her from the prison of her creation.
22. The Terra Data (1980)
23. World of Promise (1980)
24. Nectar of Heaven (1981)
25. The Terridae (1981)
26. The Coming Event (1982)
27. Earth Is Heaven (1982): At this point Dumarest is apparently the owner of a small trading vessel. Landing on a planet where the esper-talented aristocracy are a dying minority ruling harshly over the discontented majority, Dumarest seems to be welcome to inseminate one of the upper-class women. He avoids doing so, and instead helps a small group of the workers escape. The workers unsuccessfully try to colonize a planet that appears to be Earth but is in fact a planet called "Heaven." Dumarest uses his secret technology to trap a Cyclan leader in the body of one of the native "angels."
28. Melome (1983): A gifted girl able to channel painful memories offers Earl a chance to discover Earth by remembering his past.
29. Angado (1984; also published as Melome and Angado (1988)): A wealthy heir to a dynastic realm befriends Earl on his travels as an exile.
30. Symbol of Terra (1984): A quest for the source of eternal youth is undertaken in return for the promise of information about Earth.
31. The Temple of Truth (1985; also published in the omnibus Symbol of Terra and The Temple of Truth (1989)): For some time the "final" book in the series, Earl discovers what seems to be the coordinates for Earth in the temple of zealots ruling a harsh closed society.
32. The Return (1997; originally written in 1986 and was to have been titled Figures of Earth; first published in France as Le Retour (1992)): a raider society provides Earl with the chance to use a ship to travel to the location he believes to be Earth.
33. Child of Earth (2008; a small portion of this work was previously published separately as the short stories "Child of Earth" and "Figona"): a strange entrapment by a powerful being stands between Earl and the truth about Earth.
