= Space Mail =

1980 Issac Asimov short story collection

- Cover of first edition
- Editors: Isaac Asimov; Martin H. Greenberg; Joseph Olander
- Cover artist: John Berkey
- Language: English
- Series: Space Mail
- Genre: Science fiction
- Publisher: Fawcett Crest
- Publication date: 1980
- Publication place: United States
- Media type: Print (paperback)
- ISBN: 0-449-24312-5
- Followed by: Space Mail, Volume II

Space Mail is an anthology of science fiction short works edited by Isaac Asimov, Martin H. Greenberg, and Joseph Olander. It contains a series of short stories written in the form of letters, diary entries, or memoranda. The book is broken into three sections, each of which contains stories written in the type of documentation after which the section is named.

== Contents ==
=== Mail ===
- "I Never Ask No Favors" by Cyril M. Kornbluth, first published in The Magazine of Fantasy & Science Fiction (1954)
- "Letter to Ellen" by Chandler Davis, first published in Astounding Science Fiction (1947)
- "One Rejection Too Many" by Patricia Nurse, first published in Isaac Asimov's Science Fiction Magazine (1978)
- "Space Opera" by Ray Russell first published in Playboy (1961)
- "The Invasion of the Terrible Titans" by William Sambrot
- "That Only a Mother" by Judith Merril, first published in Astounding Science Fiction (1948)
- "Itch On the Bull Run" by Sharon Webb, first published in Isaac Asimov's Science Fiction Magazine (1979)
- "Letter to a Phoenix" by Fredric Brown, first published in Astounding Science Fiction (1949)
- "Who's Cribbing?" by Jack Lewis (screenwriter), first published in Startling Stories (1953)
- "Computers Don't Argue" by Gordon R. Dickson, first published in Analog Science Fiction (1965)
- "Letters from Laura" by Mildred Clingerman, first published in The Magazine of Fantasy & Science Fiction (1954)
- "Dear Pen Pal" by A. E. van Vogt, first published in The Arkham Sampler (1949)
- "Damn Shame" by Dean R. Lamb, first published in Analog Science Fiction (1979)
- "The Trap" by Howard Fast

=== Diary ===
- "Flowers For Algernon" by Daniel Keyes, first published in The Magazine of Fantasy & Science Fiction (1959)
- "The Second Kind of Loneliness" by George R. R. Martin, first published in Analog Science Fiction (1972)

=== Memos ===
- "The Lonely" by Judith Merrill, first published in Worlds of Tomorrow (1963)
- "Secret Unattainable" by A. E. van Vogt, first published in Astounding Science Fiction (1942)
- "After the Great Space War" by Barry N. Malzberg, first published in 1974
- "The Prisoner" by Christopher Anvil, first published in Astounding Science Fiction (1956)
- "Request For Proposal" by Anthony R. Lewis, first published in Analog Science Fiction (1972)
- "He Walked Around the Horses" by H. Beam Piper, first published in Astounding Science Fiction (1948)
- "The Power" by Murray Leinster, first published in Astounding Science Fiction (1945)
