= Magical Beginnings =

- Editors: Steven H. Silver; Martin H. Greenberg
- Cover artist: James Gurney
- Language: English
- Series: Beginnings
- Genre: Fantasy
- Publisher: DAW Books
- Publication date: 2003
- Publication place: United States
- Media type: Print (paperback)
- Pages: 343
- ISBN: 0-7564-0121-6
- Preceded by: Wondrous Beginnings
- Followed by: Horrible Beginnings

Magical Beginnings is an anthology of fantasy short stories edited by Steven H. Silver and Martin H. Greenberg, first published in paperback by DAW Books in February 2003. It is a compilation of the first published stories of sixteen prominent authors in the genre, and features introductions to the stories provided (in most instances) by the authors of those stories. Magical Beginnings was the second of three similarly themed anthologies, its companions being Wondrous Beginnings and Horrible Beginnings, compiling the first published stories of authors writing in the science fiction and horror genres, respectively. The series follows the example of the earlier First Flight: Maiden Voyages in Space and Time, edited by Damon Knight (Lancer Books, 1963) and First Voyages, edited by Damon Knight, Martin H. Greenberg and Joseph D. Olander (Avon Books, 1981), which focused on science fiction authors only and did not include individual introductions.

== Contents ==
- "Introduction" (Steven H Silver)
- "Introduction to 'People of the Crater'" (Andre Norton)
- "The People of the Crater" (1947) (Andre Norton)
- "Introduction to 'My Daughter's Name Is Sarah'" (Peter S. Beagle)
- "My Daughter's Name Is Sarah" (1959) (Peter S. Beagle)
- "Introduction to 'April in Paris'" (Ursula K. Le Guin)
- "April in Paris" (1962) (Ursula K. Le Guin)
- "To Light a Fire" (Susan Shwartz)
- "The Fires of Her Vengeance" (1980) (Susan M. Shwartz)
- "Introduction to 'The Fane of the Grey Rose'" (Charles de Lint)
- "The Fane of the Grey Rose" (1979) (Charles de Lint)
- "Introduction to 'Bones for Dulath'" (Megan Lindholm)
- "Bones for Dulath" (1979) (Megan Lindholm)
- "Introduction to 'The Unicorn Masque'" (Ellen Kushner)
- "The Unicorn Masque" (1981) (Ellen Kushner)
- "Introduction to 'The Stuff of Heroes'" (Esther Friesner)
- "The Stuff of Heroes" (1982) (Esther Friesner)
- "Introduction to 'The Ulfjarl's Stone'" (Mickey Zucker Reichert)
- "The Ulfjarl's Stone" (1989) (Mickey Zucker Reichert)
- "Introduction to 'Rending Dark'" (Emma Bull)
- "The Rending Dark" (1984) (Emma Bull)
- "Introduction to 'A Different Kind of Courage'" (Mercedes R. Lackey)
- "A Different Kind of Courage" (1985) (Mercedes Lackey)
- "Introduction to 'Third Time Lucky'" (Tanya Huff)
- "Third Time Lucky" (1986) (Tanya Huff)
- "On "Sing'" (Kristine Kathryn Rusch)
- "Sing" (1987) (Kristine Kathryn Rusch)
- "Introduction to 'Birthnight'" (Michelle West)
- "Birthnight" (1992) (Michelle West)
- "Introduction to 'The Jewel and the Demon'" (Lisanne Norman)
- "The Jewel and the Demon" (1998) (Lisanne Norman)
- "Introduction to 'The Raven's Quest'" (Fiona Patton)
- "The Raven's Quest" (1998) (Fiona Patton)
- "About the Authors"
