= Edwin Charles Tubb =

British science fiction author (1919–2010)

- Born: 15 October 1919; London, England
- Died: 10 September 2010 (aged 90); London, England
- Occupation: Author
- Writing career
- Genres: Science fiction, Fantasy, Westerns

Edwin Charles Tubb (15 October 1919 – 10 September 2010) was a British writer of science fiction, fantasy and western novels. The author of over 140 novels and 230 short stories and novellas, Tubb is best known for The Dumarest Saga (US collective title: Dumarest of Terra), an epic science-fiction saga set in the far future. Michael Moorcock wrote, "His reputation for fast-moving and colourful SF writing is unmatched by anyone in Britain."

Much of Tubb's work was written under pseudonyms including Gregory Kern, Carl Maddox, Alan Guthrie, Eric Storm and George Holt. He used 58 pen names over five decades of writing, although some of these were publishers' house names also used by other writers: Volsted Gridban (along with John Russell Fearn), Gill Hunt (with John Brunner and Dennis Hughes), King Lang (with George Hay and John W Jennison), Roy Sheldon (with H. J. Campbell) and Brian Shaw. Tubb's Charles Grey alias was solely his own and acquired a big following in the early 1950s.

== Life ==
Tubb was born in London and resided there until his death in 2010. He married Iris Kathleen Smith in 1944 and is survived by their two daughters, Jennifer and Linda, three grandsons, John Barham, Alan Barham and Steven, and two granddaughters, Lisa Elcomb and Julie Hickmott.

== Career ==
An avid reader of pulp science-fiction and fantasy in his youth, in 1938 Tubb made contact with other British fans and made his first attempts at writing in the genre. "My first attempts were written for my own pleasure," he later told New Worlds, "and they are now perfect examples of what not to do". Tubb found that he had a particular talent as a writer of stories in that genre when his short story "No Short Cuts" was published in New Worlds magazine in 1951. Previously a salesman of printing machinery, he opted for a full-time career as a writer and soon became renowned for the speed and diversity of his output.

Tubb wrote for many of the science fiction magazines of the 1950s including Futuristic Science Stories, Science Fantasy, Nebula and Galaxy Science Fiction. He contributed heavily to Authentic Science Fiction, editing the magazine for nearly two years from February 1956 until it folded in October 1957. During this time he found it so difficult to find good writers to contribute to the magazine that he often wrote most of the stories himself under a variety of pseudonyms.

His main work in the science fiction genre, the Dumarest series, appeared from 1967 to 1985, with two final volumes in 1997 and 2008. His second major series, the Cap Kennedy series, was written from 1973 to 1983.

Later in life Tubb updated many of his 1950s science fiction novels for 21st century readers.

Tubb was one of the co-founders of the British Science Fiction Association.

== Honors ==
Tubb was Guest of Honour at Heicon, the 1970 World Science Fiction Convention, in Heidelberg, Germany. He was a five-time winner of the Nebula Science Fiction Magazine Literary Award (1953–1958) and the recipient of the 1955 Cytricon Literary Award for Best British SF Writer. His short story "Lucifer!" won the Europa Prize in 1972. In 2010, his novel The Possessed (2005, revised version of Touch of Evil [1959]) won the Premio Italia Award for Best International Novel.

== Works ==
=== The Dumarest saga ===
Tubb's best known series is The Dumarest Saga (US collective title: Dumarest of Terra), a far future epic science-fiction saga charting the adventures of traveler Earl Dumarest as he attempts to find his way back to his home planet, Earth, from a region of space so far distant that the existence of the planet is believed to be nothing more than a myth. Originally written in what Michael Moorcock has described as a "conscious and acknowledged imitation" of Leigh Brackett's Eric John Stark stories, the series subsequently developed a style of storytelling unique to Tubb.

Published over a span of more than 40 years, the Dumarest Saga comprised 33 novels. The 33rd, which brings closure to Dumarest's search for Earth, was published in 2008 by Homeworld Press of Chicago. A pair of Dumarest short stories, entitled "Child of Earth" and "Figona" and published in the science fiction anthologies Fantasy Adventures 1 (2002) and Fantasy Adventures 2 (2003), were extracts from this longer work.

=== Cap Kennedy series ===
Tubb's other main novel series, Cap Kennedy, is space opera in the style of Perry Rhodan. Known as F.A.T.E. in the UK (where only the first six books have ever been published), the novels follow the adventures of Captain 'Cap' Kennedy, a Free Acting Terran Envoy (F.A.T.E.) with licence to act as judge, jury, and executioner, and the power to intervene in any situation which threatens the peace of the Terran Sphere, an interplanetary federation centred on Earth.

Independently wealthy and operating from his personal spaceship, the Mordain, Kennedy is assisted on his missions by engineer Penza Saratov, veteran scientist Professor Jarl Luden, and alien navigator Veem Chemile, a humanoid chameleon who claims to be descended from the Zheltyana, an ancient race which dominated the galaxy in the distant past before vanishing without trace. The discovery of mysterious artifacts left behind by the Zheltyana on different worlds often provided the spring-board for the stories in the series.

Lester del Rey found that although the first volume managed to "avoid the primitiveness and the formula" that spoiled many similar series, the virtues of such series were also missing, leaving him unenthusiastic. He later noted improvement in a subsequent installment.

Tubb wrote 17 Cap Kennedy novels, all under the pseudonym Gregory Kern.

These books were the basis for the Commander Scott series from German publishers Bastei Lübbe. This series included all of the Cap Kennedy books by Tubb as well as a number of further novels, written under pseudonym by different German authors. Published in the format of romanheft (a digest-sized version of pulp magazines), the series lasted for 42 issues from 1975 to 1976. (See the entry under the German Wikipedia, Commander Scott.)

=== Space: 1999 series ===
Tubb was the author of six novels based on Gerry Anderson's 1975 science fiction television series Space: 1999. Breakaway (1975), Collision Course (1975) and Earthbound (2003) are novelizations of 11 scripts written for the series' first season format (including two that were subsequently filmed as second-season episodes), while Alien Seed (1976), Rogue Planet (1976) and Earthfall (1977, revised 2002) are original novels set within the first season continuity. The latter rejected the format changes of the TV series' second season to provide a satisfactory conclusion to the Space 1999 story.

Tubb's short story "Random Sample" from New Writings in SF 29 (1976) was revised to become "Dead End", a short story in the Space: 1999 anthology Shepherd Moon (2010). The original story's Prometheus starship crew are replaced by the Moonbase Alpha characters in the Space: 1999 version. "Random Sample" was itself a revised version of a much earlier Tubb short, "Entrance Exam", originally published in New Worlds magazine (1951).

=== Other science fiction ===
Tubb's best known standalone novel is The Space-Born (1956), which started life as a serial for New Worlds Science Fiction magazine entitled "Star Ship". An acknowledged masterpiece of the "generational starship" story, the book tells of a society who are the sixteenth generation of the original crew of a vast starship on a 300-year journey to Pollux from Earth. The plot centres on a protagonist whose job is to eliminate anyone who has become a burden to the society, through ill health, mental instability, or anyone over 40.

Other notable standalone novels include Alien Dust (1955), which charts the first 35 years of an Earth colony on Mars, and Moon Base (1964), a science fiction detective thriller set on a British Moonbase where a biochemical computer is under development. The short story collections Ten From Tomorrow (1966), A Scatter of Stardust (1972) and The Best Science Fiction of E.C. Tubb (2003) contain the best of Tubb's short form writing, including "The Last Day of Summer" (1955), "Little Girl Lost" (1955), "Vigil" (1956), "The Bells of Acheron" (1957), "Fresh Guy" (1958), "The Ming Vase" (1963), "J is for Jeanne" (1965), and "Evane" (1973).

=== Other genres ===
Outside the field of science fiction, Tubb wrote 11 western novels, a detective novel and a Foreign Legion novel for Badger Books. Once again, many of these were published under a variety of pseudonyms, including the house name Chuck Adams, which were also used by other authors. In the 1970s he wrote a trilogy of historical novels set in Ancient Rome under the pseudonym Edward Thomson.

=== Dramatisations ===
Tubb's 1955 novel The Space-Born was dramatised for French television in 1962 as a 90-minute play for Radiodiffusion-Télévision Française. The production was directed by Alain Boudet from a script by Michael Subrela and broadcast on 11 December 1962.

The short story "Little Girl Lost", originally published in New Worlds magazine (1955), was dramatised as a segment of Night Gallery in 1972. Adapted by Stanford Whitmore and directed by Timothy Galfras, with a cast featuring William Windom and Ed Nelson, the segment originally aired on 1 March 1972, paired with The Caterpillar in the penultimate episode of the series' second season.

Tubb's award-winning short story "Lucifer!" (later published in a slightly revised version under the title "Fallen Angel") was adapted for the 2023 film, 57 Seconds starring Morgan Freeman and Josh Hutcherson. The title "57 Seconds" refers to the amount of time that the ring possessed by the main character sets back time.

== Bibliography ==
Genres: MY for mystery, HF for historical fiction, FL for Foreign Legion and WE for western.

Book series
D					The Dumarest Saga (US: Dumarest of Terra)
	C				Cap Kennedy (UK: F.A.T.E.)
		S			Space: 1999
			M		The Chronicles of Malkar
				G	The Gladiators

o omnibus edition
Reissue, sometimes under a new name.

Novels
genre	D	C	S	M	G	credits	title	year	comment
SF	1						The Winds of Gath	1967
SF	-						Gath	1968	slightly modified The Winds of Gath
SF	-						Gath	2010	reissue
SF	2						Derai	1968
SF	-						The Death Zone	2010	reissue of Derai
SF	3						Toyman	1969
SF	4						Kalin	1969
SF	5						The Jester at Scar	1970
SF	6						Lallia	1971
SF	7						Technos	1972
SF	8						Veruchia	1973
SF	9						Mayenne	1973
SF	10						Jondelle	1973
SF	11						Zenya	1974
SF	12						Eloise	1975
SF	13						Eye of the Zodiac	1975
SF	14						Jack of Swords	1976
SF	15						Spectrum of a Forgotten Sun	1976
SF	16						Haven of Darkness	1977
SF	17						Prison of Night	1977
SF	18						Incident on Ath	1978
SF	19						The Quillian Sector	1978
SF	20						Web of Sand	1979
SF	21						Iduna's Universe	1979
SF	22						The Terra Data	1980
SF	23						World of Promise	1980
SF	24						Nectar of Heaven	1981
SF	25						The Terridae	1981
SF	26						The Coming Event	1982
SF	27						Earth is Heaven	1982
SF	28						Melome	1983
SF	-						Melome and Angado	1988	in UK: Angado and Melome
SF	29						Angado	1984
SF	30						Symbol of Terra	1984
SF	31						The Temple of Truth	1985
SF	-						Symbol of Terra and The Temple of Truth	1989	in UK: Symbol of Terra and The Temple of Truth
SF	32						The Return	1997	written 1985
SF	-						Le Retour	1992	The Return in French
SF	33						Child of Earth	2008
SF	o						The Winds of Gath / Derai	1973	The Winds of Gath (1967) and Derai (1968)
SF	o						Mayenne and Jondelle	1981	Mayenne and Jondelle
SF	o						Dumarest of Terra Omnibus	2005	The Winds of Gath (1967), Derai (1968), Toyman and Kalin
SF		1				Gregory Kern	Galaxy of the Lost	1973
SF		2				Gregory Kern	Slave Ship from Sergan	1973
SF		3				Gregory Kern	Monster of Metelaze	1973
SF		4				Gregory Kern	Enemy Within the Skull	1974
SF		5				Gregory Kern	Jewel of Jarhen	1974
SF		6				Gregory Kern	Seetee Alert!	1974
SF		7				Gregory Kern	The Gholan Gate	1974
SF		8				Gregory Kern	The Eater of Worlds	1974
SF		9				Gregory Kern	Earth Enslaved	1974
SF		10				Gregory Kern	Planet of Dread	1974
SF		11				Gregory Kern	Spawn of Laban	1974
SF		12				Gregory Kern	The Genetic Buccaneer	1974
SF		13				Gregory Kern	A World Aflame	1974
SF		14				Gregory Kern	The Ghosts of Epidoris	1975
SF		15				Gregory Kern	Mimics of Dephene	1975
SF		16				Gregory Kern	Beyond the Galactic Lens	1975
SF		17				Gregory Kern	The Galactiad	1983	written 1976
SF		-				Gregory Kern	Das kosmische Duell	1976	The Galactiad in German
SF			1				Breakaway	1975
SF			2				Collision Course	1975
SF			3				Alien Seed	1976
SF			4				Rogue Planet	1976
SF			5				Earthfall	1977
SF			-				Earthfall	2002	reissue: 25th anniversary revised edition
SF			6				Earthbound	2003
SF			7				Year One	2020
SF			-				Year One	2023	revised second edition
SF				1			Death God's Doom	1999
SF				2			The Sleeping City	1999
SF						King Lang	Saturn Patrol	1951
SF						E.C. Tubb	Saturn Patrol	1996	reissue
SF							The Warbirds	2021	reissue of Saturn Patrol
SF						Gill Hunt	Planetfall	1951
SF						Brian Shaw	Argentis	1952
SF						E.C. Tubb	Argentis	1979	reissue
SF							Alien Impact	1952
SF						Volsted Gridban	Alien Universe	1952
SF						E.C. Tubb	The Green Helix	2009	reissue of Alien Universe
SF						Volsted Gridban	Reverse Universe	1952
SF							Atom War on Mars	1952
SF						Volsted Gridban	Planetoid Disposals Ltd.	1953
SF						Volsted Gridban	De Bracy's Drug	1953
SF						E.C. Tubb	De Bracy's Drug	2004	reissue
SF						E.C. Tubb	The Freedom Army	2009	reissue of De Bracy's Drug
SF						Volsted Gridban	Fugitive of Time	1953
SF						Charles Grey	The Wall	1953
SF						E.C. Tubb	The Wall	1999	reissue
SF						E.C. Tubb	The Wall	2009	reissue
SF							The Mutants Rebel	1953
SF							World in Torment	2008	reissue of The Mutants Rebel
SF						Charles Grey	Dynasty of Doom	1953
SF						Charles Grey	The Tormented City	1953
SF						E.C. Tubb	Secret of the Towers	2008	reissue of The Tormented City
SF						Charles Grey	Space Hunger	1953
SF						E.C. Tubb	Earth Set Free	1999	reissue of Space Hunger
SF						E.C. Tubb	The Price of Freedom	2008	reissue of Space Hunger
SF						Charles Grey	I Fight for Mars	1953
SF						E.C. Tubb	I Fight for Mars	1998	reissue
SF							Venusian Adventure	1953
SF							Alien Life	1954
SF						Carl Maddox	The Living World	1954
SF							The Extra Man	1954
SF							Fifty Days to Doom	2010	reissue of The Extra Man
SF						Carl Maddox	Menace from the Past	1954
SF						Roy Sheldon	The Metal Eater	1954
SF							Journey to Mars	1954
SF							World at Bay	1954
SF							Tide of Death	2008	reissue of World at Bay
SF							City of No Return	1954
SF							Hell Planet	1954
SF							The Resurrected Man	1954
SF							The Stellar Legion	1954
SF						Charles Grey	The Hand of Havoc	1954
SF						Charles Grey	Enterprise 2115	1954
SF						Charles Grey	The Mechanical Monarch	1958	reissue of Enterprise 2115
SF							Alien Dust	1955
SF							The Space-Born	1956
SF						Arthur Maclean	Touch of Evil	1957
SF						E.C. Tubb	The Possessed	2005	revised Touch of Evil
SF							Moon Base	1964
SF							Death is a Dream	1967
SF							The Life-Buyer	1967
SF							The Life Buyer	2006	reissue of The Life-Buyer
SF							C.O.D. - Mars	1968
SF							Fear of Strangers	2007	reissue of C.O.D. - Mars
SF							Escape into Space	1969
SF							S.T.A.R. Flight	1969
SF							Century of the Manikin	1972
SF							The Primitive	1977
SF							Death Wears a White Face	1979
SF							Dead Weight	2007	reissue of Death Wears a White Face
SF							Stellar Assignment	1979
SF							The Luck Machine	1980
SF							Pawn of the Omphalos	1980
SF							Death God's Doom	1999	revised Pawn of the Omphalos
SF							Stardeath	1983
SF							Pandora's Box	1996	written 1954
SF							Temple of Death	1996	written 1954
SF							Alien Life	1998	revised and expanded Alien Life 1954
SF							Journey into Terror	2009	reissue of Alien Life 1998
SF							Alien Worlds	1999	Alien Dust and Alien Universe
SF							Footsteps of Angels	2004	written circa 1988
SF							Starslave	2010	written 1984
SF							To Dream Again	2011
SF							Fires of Satan	2012
MY						Mike Lantry	Assignment New York	1955
MY						E.C. Tubb	Assignment New York	1996	reissue
WE						Paul Schofield	The Fighting Fury	1955
WE						Chuck Adams	The Fighting Fury	1962	reissue
WE						E.C. Tubb	The Gold Seekers	2000	reissue of The Fighting Fury
WE						E. F. Jackson	Comanche Capture	1955
WE						E. F. Jackson	The Captive	2000	reissue of Comanche Capture
WE						E.C. Tubb	The Captive	2010	reissue
FL						Jud Cary	Sands of Destiny	1955
FL						E.C. Tubb	Sands of Destiny	2009	reissue
FL						E.C. Tubb	Sands of Destiny: A Novel of the French Foreign Legion	2011	reissue of Sands of Destiny
WE						J. F. Clarkson	Men of the Long Rifle	1955
WE						Charles Grey	The Pathfinders	2000	reissue of Men of the Long Rifle
WE						M. L. Powers	Scourge of the South	1956
WE						M. L. Powers	The Marauders	1960	reissue of Scourge of the South
WE						George Holt	Scourge of the South	2000	reissue
WE						James Farrow	Vengeance Trail	1956
WE						Brett Landry	The Liberators	2000	reissue of Vengeance Trail
WE						Chuck Adams	Trail Blazers	1956
WE						Chuck Adams	The Last Outlaw	1961	reissue of Trail Blazers
WE						Eric Storm	Trail Blazers	2000	reissue
WE						E.C. Tubb	Trail Blazers	2007	reissue
WE						John Stevens	Quest for Quantrell	1956
WE						John Stevens	Night Raiders	1960	reissue of Quest for Quantrell
WE						Carl Maddox	Curse of Quantrill	2000	reissue of Quest for Quantrell
WE						P. Lawrence	Drums of the Prairie	1956
WE						L. P. Eastern	The Red Lance	1959	reissue of Drums of the Prairie
WE						Edward Thomson	The Dying Tree	2000	reissue of Drums of the Prairie
WE						Chet Lawson	Men of the West	1956
WE						Chuck Adams	Massacre Trail	1960	reissue of Men of the West
WE						Frank Weight	Hills of Blood	2000	reissue of Men of the West
WE						Charles S. Graham	Wagon Trail	1957
WE						Gordon Kent	Cauldron of Violence	2000	reissue of Wagon Trail
WE						E.C. Tubb	Cauldron of Violence	2010	reissue
WE						James R. Fenner	Colt Vengeance	1957
WE						Chuck Adams	Colt Law	1962	reissue of Colt Vengeance
WE						E.C. Tubb	The First Shot	2000	reissue of Colt Vengeance
HF					1	Edward Thomson	Atilus the Slave	1975
HF					2	Edward Thomson	Atilus the Gladiator	1975
HF					3	Edward Thomson	Gladiator	1978

=== Short story collections ===
- Supernatural Stories 9 (1957), as by various pseudonyms
- Ten from Tomorrow (1966)
- A Scatter of Stardust (1972)
- Kalgan the Golden (1996)
- Murder in Space (1997)
- The Best Science Fiction of E.C. Tubb (2003)
- Mirror of the Night and Other Weird Tales (2003)
- The Wager: Science Fiction Mystery Tales (2011)
- The Ming Vase and Other Science Fiction Stories (2011)
- Enemy of the State: Fantastic Mystery Stories (2011)
- Tomorrow: Science Fiction Mystery Tales (2011)
- The Wonderful Day: Science Fiction Stories (2012)
- Only One Winner: Science Fiction Mystery Tales (2013)
- The Troublemaker and Other Stories (2020)
- Secret Weapon and Other Stories (2020)

=== Novellas ===
title	publication	year	credits
Freight	Nebula 3	1953
Subtle Victory	Authentic Science Fiction 39	1953
The Inevitable Conflict	Vargo Statten Science Fiction 1–3	1954
Forbidden Fruit	Vargo Statten/British Science Fiction 4–6	1954
Star Haven	Authentic Science Fiction 52	1954
Number Thirteen	Authentic Science Fiction 69	1956	Douglas West
The Big Secret	Authentic Science Fiction 70	1956	Ken Wainwright
The Give-Away Worlds	Authentic Science Fiction 72	1956	Julian Cary
Enemy of the State	Authentic Science Fiction 74	1956	Ken Wainwright
There's Only One Winner	Authentic Science Fiction 81	1957	Nigel Lloyd
The Touch of Reality	Nebula 28	1958
Galactic Destiny	SF Adventures 10	1959
Spawn of Jupiter	Vision of Tomorrow 11	1970

=== Comic Books ===
title	publication	year
Hellfire Landing	Commando issue 5	1961
Target Death	Combat Library issue 102	1961
Lucky Strike	War Picture Library issue 124	1961
Calculated Risk	Air Ace Picture Library issue 78	1961
Too Tough to Handle	War Picture Library issue 134	1962
The Dead Keep Faith	War Picture Library issue 140	1962
The Spark of Anger	Battle Picture Library issue 52	1962
Full Impact	Air Ace Picture Library issue 92	1962
I Vow Vengeance	War at Sea Picture Library issue 7	1962
One Must Die	Battle Picture Library issue 72	1962
Gunflash	War Picture Library issue 157	1962
Hit Back	Battle Picture Library issue 69	1962
Suicide Squad	War Picture Library issue 172	1962
No Higher Stakes	Battle Picture Library issue 89	1963
Penalty of Fear	Thriller Picture Library issue 444	1963

=== Anthologies ===
publication	editors	year	contributions
Gateway to the Stars	John Carnell	1955	'Unfortunate Purchase'
SF: The Year's Greatest Science Fiction and Fantasy	Judith Merril	1956	'The Last Day of Summer'
SF '59: The Year's Greatest Science Fiction and Fantasy	Judith Merril	1959	'Fresh Guy'
The Vampire	Ornella Volta, Valerio Riva	1963	'Fresh Guy'
The Year's Best SF: 9	Judith Merril	1964	'The Ming Vase'
Dimension 4	Groff Conklin	1964	'Sense of Proportion'
Best of New Worlds	Michael Moorcock	1965	'New Experience'
Weird Shadows from Beyond	John Carnell	1965	'Fresh Guy'
New Writings in SF 6	John Carnell	1965	'The Seekers'
The Year's Best SF: 11th	Judith Merril	1966	'J is for Jeanne'
SF Reprise 1	Michael Moorcock	1966	'New Experience'
Window on the Future	Douglas Hill	1966	'Sense of Proportion'
9th Annual S-F	Judith Merril	1967	'The Ming Vase'
The Devil His Due	Douglas Hill	1967	'Return Visit'
More Tales of Unease	John Burke	1969	'Little Girl Lost'
The Best of Sci-fi 12	Judith Merril	1970	'J is for Jeanne'
The Year's Best Horror Stories	Richard Davis	1971	'Lucifer!'
New Writings in Horror and the Supernatural	David Sutton	1971	'The Winner'
New Writings in SF 22	Kenneth Bulmer	1973	'Evane'
Space 1	Richard Davis	1973	'Mistaken Identity'
The 1974 Annual World's Best SF	Donald Wollheim	1974	'Evane'
New Writings in SF 23	Kenneth Bulmer	1974	'Made to be Broken', 'Accolade'
History of the Science Fiction Magazine 1946-1955	Mike Ashley	1974	'The Wager'
World's Best SF Short Stories 1	Donald Wollheim	1975	'Evane'
New Writings in SF 28	Kenneth Bulmer	1976	'Face to Infinity'
New Writings in SF 29	Kenneth Bulmer	1976	'Random Sample'
Best of British SF Vol. 2	Mike Ashley	1977	'Trojan Horse'
Strange Planets	A. Williams-Ellis, M. Pearson	1977	'Made to be Broken'
New Writings in SF 30	Kenneth Bulmer	1978	'Read Me This Riddle'
Perilous Planets	Brian Aldiss	1978	'The Seekers'
The Androids Are Coming	Robert Silverberg	1979	'The Captain's Dog'
Wollheim's World of Best SF	Donald Wollheim	1979	'Evane'
Heroic Fantasy	Gerald Page, Hank Reinhardt	1979	'Blood in the Mist'
Pulsar 2	George Hay	1979	'The Knife'
Jewels of Wonder	Mike Ashley	1981	'Blood in the Mist'
The Drabble Project	Rob Meades, David B. Wake	1988	'As it Really Was', 'The Very Small Knife'
Space Stories	Mike Ashley	1996	'The Bells of Acheron'
Classical Stories: Heroic Tales from Ancient Greece and Rome	Mike Ashley	1996	'The Sword of Freedom'
The New Random House Book of Science Fiction Stories	Mike Ashley	1997	'The Bells of Acheron'
Fantasy Annual 1	Philip Harbottle, Sean Wallace	1997	'Time and Again'
Heroic Adventure Stories: From the Golden Age of Greece and Rome	Mike Ashley	1998	'The Sword of Freedom'
Giant Book of Heroic Adventure Stories	Mike Ashley	1998	'The Sword of Freedom'
The Iron God/Tomorrow Gryphon Double	Philip Harbottle	1998	'Tomorrow'
Fantasy Annual 2	Philip Harbottle, Sean Wallace	1998	'Gift Wrapped'
Fantasy Annual 3	Philip Harbottle, Sean Wallace	1999	'Fallen Angel'
Gryphon Science Fiction and Fantasy Reader 1	Philip Harbottle	1999	'Talk Not at All'
Fantasy Annual 4	Philip Harbottle, Sean Wallace	2000	'Afternoon'
Fantasy Quarterly 1	Philip Harbottle	2001	'The Inevitable Conflict'
Fantasy Adventures 1	Philip Harbottle	2002	'Child of Earth'
Fantasy Adventures 2	Philip Harbottle	2002	'Figona', 'Emergency Exit'
Fantasy Annual 5	Philip Harbottle, Sean Wallace	2003	'Lazarus'
Fantasy Adventures 3	Philip Harbottle	2003	'Illusion'
Fantasy Adventures 4	Philip Harbottle	2003	'The Greater Ideal'
Fantasy Adventures 5	Philip Harbottle	2003	'The Answer'
Fantasy Adventures 6	Philip Harbottle	2003	'Food for Friendship'
Fantasy Adventures 7	Philip Harbottle	2003	'Sell Me a Dream'
Mammoth Book of New Terror	Stephen Jones	2004	'Mirror of the Night'
Fantasy Adventures 8	Philip Harbottle	2004	'Jackpot'
Fantasy Adventures 9	Philip Harbottle	2004	'Spawn of Jupiter'
Fantasy Adventures 10	Philip Harbottle	2004	'The Dilettantes'
Fantasy Adventures 11	Philip Harbottle	2004	'Agent'
Fantasy Adventures 12	Philip Harbottle	2006	'You Go'
Space:1999 - Shepherd Moon	Mateo Latosa	2010	'Dead End'
