= Space Mail, Volume II =

- Cover of first edition
- Editors: Isaac Asimov; Martin H. Greenberg; Charles G. Waugh
- Cover artist: Paul Alexander
- Language: English
- Series: Space Mail
- Genre: Science fiction
- Publisher: Fawcett Crest
- Publication date: 1982
- Publication place: United States
- Media type: Print (paperback)
- Pages: 380
- ISBN: 0-449-24481-4
- Preceded by: Space Mail

Space Mail, Volume II is an anthology of science fiction short works edited by Isaac Asimov, Martin H. Greenberg, Charles G. Waugh. It was first published in paperback by Fawcett Crest in January 1982.

The book collects twenty-two short stories written in the form of a letters, diary entries, or memorandums, together with an introduction by Asimov.

== Contents ==
- "Introduction" (Isaac Asimov)
- "Extracts from Adam's Diary" (Mark Twain)
- "Aspic's Mystery" (Arsen Darnay)
- "Barney" (Will Stanton)
- "Evening Primrose" (John Collier)
- "View from a Height" (Joan D. Vinge)
- "First to Serve" (Algis Budrys)
- "The People's Choice" (William Jon Watkins)
- "Expedition" (Anthony Boucher)
- "Polity and Custom of the Camiroi" (R. A. Lafferty)
- "Primary Education of the Camiroi" (R. A. Lafferty)
- "The Shaker Revival" (Gerald Jonas)
- "Loophole" (Arthur C. Clarke)
- "Niche on the Bull Run" (Sharon Webb)
- "Switch on the Bull Run" (Sharon Webb)
- "Publish and Perish" (Paul J. Nahin)
- "Letters from Camp" (Al Sarrantonio)
- "The Several Murders of Roger Ackroyd" (Barry N. Malzberg)
- "A Delightful Comedic Premise" (Barry N. Malzberg)
- "The Man from Not-Yet" (John Sladek)
- "The Leader" (Murray Leinster)
- "Aristotle and the Gun" (L. Sprague de Camp)
- "The Last Evolution" (John W. Campbell, Jr.)
