= Rog Phillips =

American novelist (1909–1966)

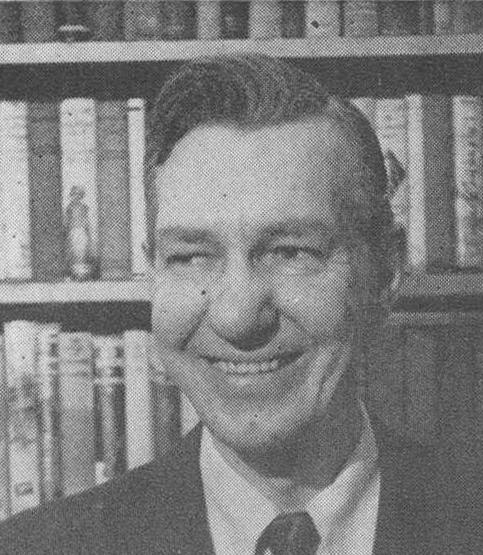
- "Rog Phillips" c. 1953
- Born: Roger Phillip Graham; February 20, 1909; Spokane, Washington
- Died: March 2, 1966 (aged 57)
- Other name: Craig Browning
- Occupation: Author

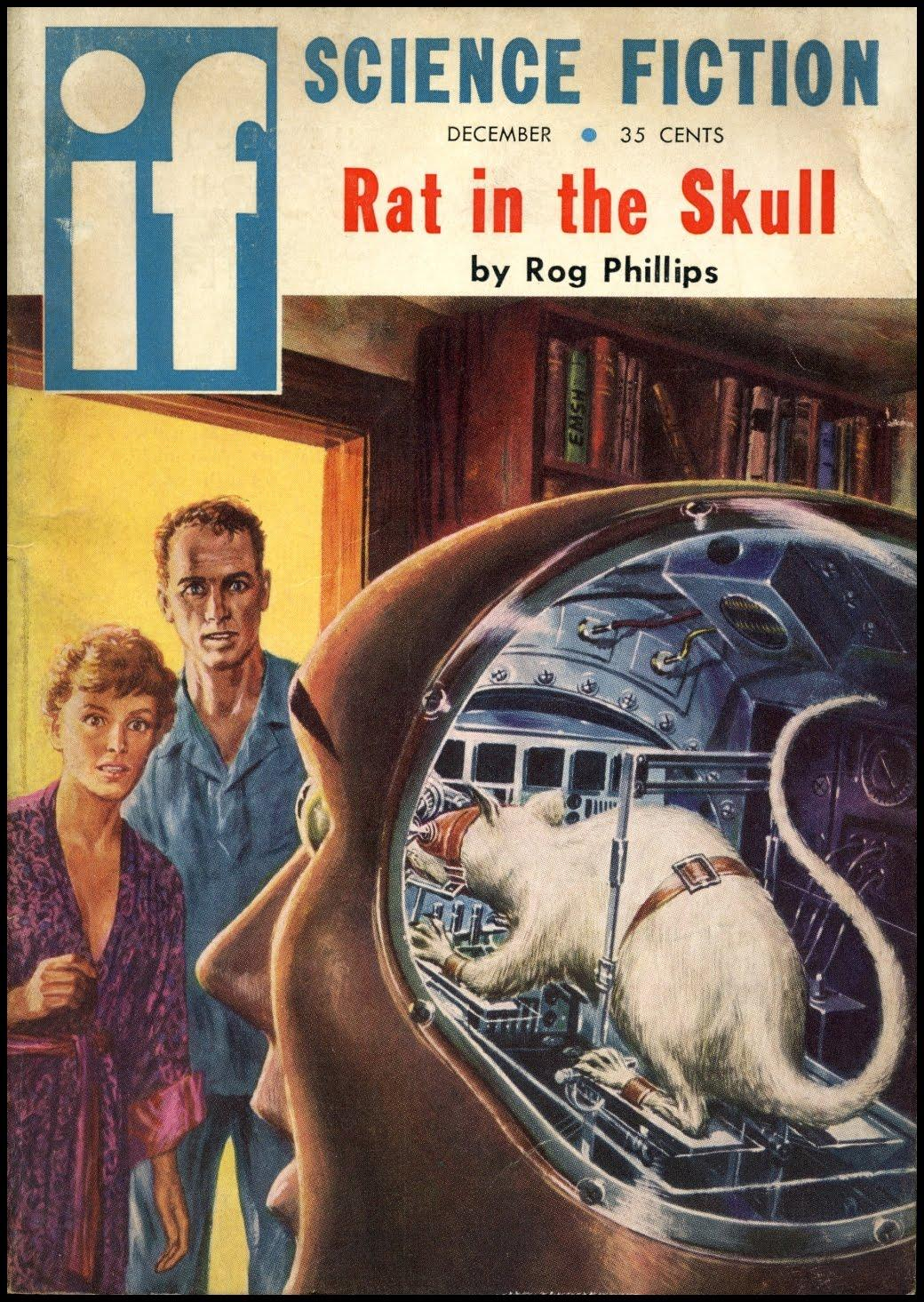
Phillips's Hugo-nominated "Rat in the Skull" was the cover story for December 1958 issue of magazine If.

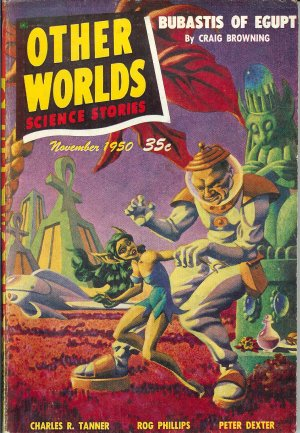
Phillips's novelette "Bubastis of Egupt", using his byline "Craig Browning", was the cover story of the December 1950 issue of Other Worlds Science Stories, illustrated by Hannes Bok

Roger Phillip Graham (February 20, 1909 – March 2, 1966) was an American science fiction writer who was published most often using the name Rog Phillips, but also used other names. Of his other pseudonyms, only Craig Browning is notable in the genre. He is associated most with Amazing Stories and is known best for short fiction. He was nominated for the Hugo Award for Best Novelette in 1959.

== Biography ==
Roger Phillip Graham was born in Spokane, Washington, on February 20, 1909. His family changed its residence frequently during the Great Depression, as his father, John Alfred Graham, moved around the country looking for work. Roger's sophomore year was spent at Kingfisher High School in Tulsa, Oklahoma. He returned to Spokane for college, graduating from Gonzaga University in 1931. He also studied at the University of Washington in Seattle.

Graham was a power plant engineer until the beginning of World War II, when he worked as a shipyard welder and longshoreman. After the war he became a full-time writer, using twenty different pseudonyms: Clinton Ames, Drew Ames, Robert Arnette, Franklin Bahl, Alexander Blade, Craig Browning, Gregg Conrad, P.F. Costello, Sanandana Kumara, Charles Lee, Charles Mann, Milton Mann, Inez McGowan, Melva Rogers, Chester Ruppert, William Carter Sawtelle, A.R. Steber, Gerald Vance, John H. Wiley, and Peter Worth.

On October 8, 1938, Graham married Eleanor Cora Smith, with whom he lived in Kirkland, Washington. The couple had divorced by 1946.

== Writing career ==
Graham's first published work was a detective story, "Murder Note," as by Charles Mann, that appeared in the Winter 1943 issue of The Masked Detective. Raymond A. Palmer, editor of Amazing Stories, started Graham's science fiction career in 1945, with a $500 advance for his story, "Let Freedom Ring!" To facilitate more work with Palmer and his associate editor, William Hamling, Graham moved to Evanston, Illinois.

In response to falling sales, due to the Shaver Mystery Hoax, Palmer instituted a column of fan news and fanzine reviews in the March 1948 issue of Amazing Stories. Called The Club House, it was intended to create a sense of community among readers. Graham, now an official staff columnist for Ziff Davis, edited the feature under the name Rog Phillips, publishing 57 editions.

Phillips experienced the height of his success between 1946 and 1953. His entry in The Encyclopedia of Science Fiction and Fantasy, Vol. 2: Who's Who, M-Z (Advent:Publishers, Chicago, 1978), lists several stories of interest from this period, including “Atom War” (Amazing Stories, May 1946); “So Shall Ye Reap!” (Amazing Stories, August 1947); “M’Bong-Ah” (Amazing Stories, February 1949); “The Cyberene” (Imagination, December 1953). A recurring character, Lefty Baker, appears in six stories with a humorous tone: “Squeeze Play" (Amazing Stories, November 1947); “The Immortal Menace” (Amazing Stories, February 1949); “The Insane Robot” (Fantastic Adventures, November 1949); “It’s Like This” (Fantastic Story Quarterly, November 1952); “Lefty Baker’s Nuthouse” (Imaginative Tales, January 1958); “…But Who Knows Huer, or Huen?” (Fantastic, November 1961).

Phillips' 1949 work, Time Trap, published by Century Pocket Books (#116) in mass-market rack size, has been cited as being one of the first original science fiction paperbacks ever printed, if not the very first. Century Books followed Time Trap by publishing Worlds Within (#124, 1950) and World of If (as by Merit Books, #B-13, 1951).

On October 24, 1951, Phillips married Mari Wolf in Chicago. As a wedding gift, William Hamling hired Wolf to write a column identical to The Club House, Fandora's Box, for his fledgling science fiction magazine, Imagination. Phillips and Wolf divorced in 1955.

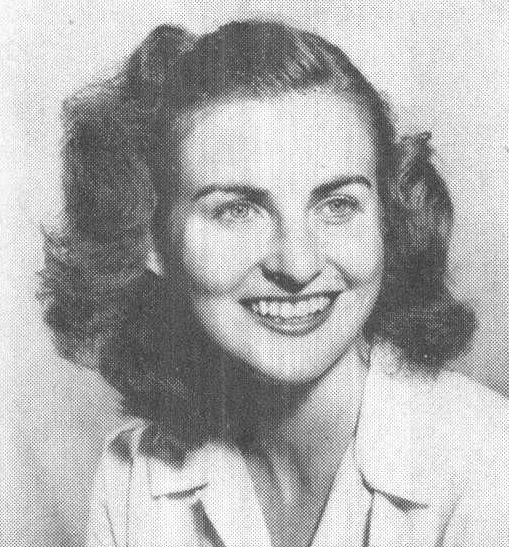
Mari Wolf

In his July 1952 Club House column, Phillips announced that Melvin Korshak of Shasta Publishers was going to publish his book Frontiers in the Sky. Shasta subsequently went out of business, having been caught up in a scandal when it failed to pay Philip José Farmer for winning a writing contest, and Phillips' book was never printed.

Howard Browne, the new editor of Amazing Stories, fired Phillips in 1953. A Club House installment was published in that year's March issue, and Phillips submitted a short story some months later. He made no further appearances in the magazine until the editorship of Paul W. Fairman, who accepted eight of Phillips' stories between 1957 and 1959.

The Club House column was taken up by Universe Science Fiction, another Ray Palmer publication. It first appeared in the July 1954 issue and made five appearances before Universe folded in March 1955. Other Worlds Science Stories, a further Palmer publication, ran five more installments of the column between May 1955 and April 1956, before it too went out of business.

With the dwindling acceptance of his fiction, Phillips wrote a series of articles for Mystic magazine, yet another Palmer publication, with such philosophical topics as "Searching for the Elixir of Life," written under the pseudonym Drew Ames.

In 1957 Phillips married again, to Honey Wood. Both were members of Outlanders, a noted West Coast science fiction fan club, and in 1958 Phillips was made Program Director when the group hosted the Solacon (SoLaCon: South Los Angeles Convention; the official nickname for the Sixteenth World Science Fiction Convention, also called the 11th Westercon). Phillips also manufactured the Hugo Award trophies for 1958.

During this time Phillips reemerged as a front-running science fiction writer with such notable stories as: "Game Preserve" (If, October 1957; reprinted in Judith Merril's SF '58: The Year's Greatest Science Fiction and Fantasy (Gnome Press, 1958), and "The Yellow Pill" (Astounding, October 1958; reprinted in Judith Merril's SF '59: The Year's Greatest Science Fiction and Fantasy, Gnome Press, 1959). His psychological thriller, "Rat in the Skull" (If, December 1958), received a Hugo Award nomination.

Phillips' only hardbound novel, The Involuntary Immortal, enlarged from a Fantastic Adventures novelette (December 1949), was published by Avalon in 1959.

== Final years ==
Phillips' final publications were seven detective stories in Alfred Hitchcock's Mystery Magazine. His last official public appearance was as Guest of Honor at Westercon XIII in Boise, Idaho, during the July 3–5, 1960 weekend.

Phillips had been under a doctor's care for the last six years of his life and was scheduled to have heart surgery to replace a defective valve. After being hospitalized for a preoperative period in late February 1966, he entered a coma from which he never recovered. He died on March 2, 1966, of heart complications, at the age of 56.

== Bibliography ==
=== Speculative short stories ===
A nearly complete listing of Roger Phillip Graham's speculative fiction can be found at the Internet Speculative Fiction Database website.

What follows is a short list of some of his better known works out of the 205 stories he wrote. As well as 19 early reprints, 20 articles, 1 cite, at least 8 fanzine articles, 67 The Club House columns, 3 paperbacks, and 1 hardcover.

- Let Freedom Ring!, Amazing Stories (December 1945)
- Atom War, Amazing Stories (May 1946)
- The Mutants, Amazing Stories (July 1946)
- Battle of the Gods, Amazing Stories (September 1946)
- The House, Amazing Stories (February 1947)
- So Shall Ye Reap!, Amazing Stories (August 1947)
- Starship from Sirius, Amazing Stories (August 1948)
- Cube Root of Conquest, Amazing Stories (October 1948)
- Tillie, Amazing Stories (December 1948)
- The Unthinking Destroyer, Amazing Stories (December 1948)
- Unthinkable, Amazing Stories (April 1949)
- Bubastis of Egupt, Other Worlds Science Stories (December 1950)
- The Old Martians, If Worlds of Science Fiction (March 1952)
- From This Dark Mind, Fantastic (November–December 1953)
- Ye of Little Faith, If Worlds of Science Fiction (January 1953)
- The Yellow Pill, Astounding (October 1958)
- Rat in the Skull, If Worlds of Science Fiction (December 1958)
- The Gallery, Amazing Stories (January 1959)

== Works Other Than Speculative ==
- Murder Note. as by Charles Mann, The Masked Detective (Winter 1943)
- Frame for a Fed, F.B.I. Detective Stories (June 1950)
- To Dream of Murder, Famous Detective Stories (February 1954)
- Portrait of the Artist's Wife, as by Inez McGowan, Ladies' Home Journal (April 1958)
- A Case of Homicide, Keyhole Mystery Magazine (June 1960)
- Good Sound Therapy, Mike Shayne Mystery Magazine (October 1960)
- The Full Treatment, Alfred Hitchcock's Mystery Magazine (January 1961)
- The Egg Head, Alfred Hitchcock's Mystery Magazine (August 1961)
- First Come, First Served, Alfred Hitchcock's Mystery Magazine (October 1962)
- Justice, Inc., Alfred Hitchcock's Mystery Magazine (January 1963)
- Experience is Helpful, Alfred Hitchcock's Mystery Magazine (March 1964)
- Legacy of Office, Alfred Hitchcock's Mystery Magazine (June 1964)
- The Hypothetical Arsonist, Alfred Hitchcock's Mystery Magazine (December 1965)

== Free works ==
- The Gallery
- Unthinkable

== Paperbacks ==
- Time Trap, Century Books (1949)
- Worlds Within, Century Books (1950)
- World of If, Merit Books (1951)

== Hardcover ==
- The Involuntary Immortals, Avalon (1959) [This title is still under copyright!]

== Posthumous works ==
- The Essential Rog Phillips

33 short stories spanning Phillips' career ISBN 978-1777244705

- Rog Phillips’ The Club House

Containing all 67 appearances of The Club House

Author: Roger Phillip Graham

Edited and with an introduction: Earl Terry Kemp

Introduction: “Roger Phillip Graham: The Man Who Was Rog Phillips,” by Earl Terry Kemp; pp. xv-xxiii

Afterword: “Roger Phillips,” by Robert Silverberg; pp. 573–578

The Last Stand; October 2014; softcover; cover artist: Steve Stiles

630 pages; with black and white illustrations; 8 ½ x 11 inches

ISBN 9781495344428

- The Complete Lefty Baker

Author: Rog Phillips [Roger Phillip Graham]

Edited and with an introduction: Earl Terry Kemp

Introduction: by Earl Terry Kemp; pp. xi-xii

Goldleaf Books; October 2012; softcover; cover artist: Earl Terry Kemp

113 pages

ISBN 9780615697543

- The Best of Rog Phillips, Volume II

Author: Rog Phillips [Roger Phillip Graham]

Edited and with an introduction: Earl Terry Kemp

Introduction: by Earl Terry Kemp; pp. xi-xii

Goldleaf Books; January 2013; softcover; cover artist: Earl Terry Kemp

181 pages

ISBN 9781481115926

- The Best of Rog Phillips, Volume III

Containing: Time Trap and Worlds Within

Author: Rog Phillips [Roger Phillip Graham]

Edited and with an introduction: Earl Terry Kemp

Introduction: by Earl Terry Kemp; pp. xi-xii

Goldleaf Books; March 2013; softcover; cover art and design: Earl Terry Kemp

254 pages

ISBN 9781482635546

- The Best of Rog Phillips, Volume IV

Containing: World of If, Game Preserve, The Yellow Pill, and The Rat in the Skull

Author: Rog Phillips [Roger Phillip Graham]

Edited and with an introduction: Earl Terry Kemp

Introduction: by Earl Terry Kemp; pp. xi-xiii

Goldleaf Books; October 2014; softcover; cover art and design: Earl Terry Kemp

211 pages

ISBN 9781503080249
