= Steven H Silver =

American writer, editor, and publisher

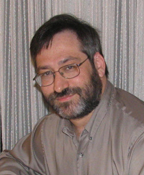
- Silver in 2008
- Born: April 19, 1967 (age 59); Hinsdale, Illinois, U.S.
- Occupations: Technical writer; editor; publisher; reviewer; novelist; short story author
- Writing career
- Period: 2008–present
- Genres: Science fiction, Fantasy
- Website: www.stevenhsilver.com

Steven H Silver (born April 19, 1967) is an American science fiction fan and bibliographer, publisher, author, and editor. He has been nominated for the Hugo Award for Best Fan Writer twelve times and Best Fanzine ten times without winning (three for Argentus and seven for Journey Planet).

The "H" is his middle name and not an initial.

He received a bachelor of arts in 1989 and a master of arts in 1992 from Indiana University.

== Editor, publisher, and writer ==
Silver was born in Hinsdale, Illinois. He is a longtime contributing editor to SF Site and wrote that site's news page from its inception in 2002 until it closed in 2014.

=== Anthologies ===
In 2003, he co-edited three anthologies with Martin H. Greenberg, Wondrous Beginnings, Magical Beginnings, and Horrible Beginnings, which reprinted the first published stories of authors in the science fiction, fantasy, and horror genres. From 2004 through 2012 he was the publisher and editor of ISFiC Press. He co-edited the alternate history anthology Alternate Peace in 2019 with Joshua Palmatier.

=== Short fiction ===
Silver published his first short story, "Les Lettres de Paston", in the final issue of Helix SF. Silver had earlier written a column on alternate history for the magazine. He has continued to publish short stories since, as well as some poetry.

=== Collections ===
In 2009 and 2010, he edited the two volume Selected Stories of Lester del Rey for NESFA Press. The first volume is entitled War and Space and appeared in August, 2009. The second volume, Robots and Magic was published in February 2010.

=== Novels ===
Silver's first novel, After Hastings, an alternate history in which Harold Godwinson prevented the Norman conquest of Britain by defeating William the Conqueror at the Battle of Hastings, was published by Ring of Fire Press in July 2020.

== Fandom ==
=== Sidewise and Nebula Awards ===
In 1995, he founded the Sidewise Award for Alternate History and has served as a judge ever since. He was on the short story jury for the Nebula Award in 2002, and on the novel jury for the Nebula Award in 2003, 2006, and chaired the novel jury in 2008. In 2005, Silver was one of the co-ordinators of the Nebula weekend in Chicago. In 2008, he was appointed SFWA Event Coordinator and has helped run the Nebula Award Weekends in that capacity from 2009 to 2021.

=== Fanzines ===
Silver is known as an on-line reviewer and has written several articles for science fiction fanzines, as well as publishing his own annual fanzine Argentus, which was nominated for a Hugo Award for Best Fanzine in 2008, 2009, and 2010, and won the Chronic Rift Roundtable Award for Best Fanzine in 2009 and the monthly APA-zine Plata. He has guest edited seven issues of Journey Planet.

=== Conventions ===
In addition to his writing and editing activities, Silver is involved in running science fiction conventions. He has chaired Windycon three times, founded Midfan and chaired the first Midwest Construction, and ran programming for Chicon 2000, the Worldcon. From 1998 through 2006 and again from 2008, he sat on the board of directors for ISFiC. He served as a vice chair for Chicon 7 in 2012.

== Personal background ==
In 2000, Silver appeared on Jeopardy! winning two days and coming in second on his third day. He won $15,000.

== Bibliography ==
=== Novels ===
After Hastings (June 2020), ISBN 978-1948818940

=== Short fiction ===
- "Les Lettres de Paston" (2008), original publish in Helix SF magazine, but has been republished on SF Site
- "Bats in Thebayou" (2009), published in the anthology Zombie Raccoons & Killer Bunnies, ISBN 978-0-7564-0582-3
- "Boleslaw Szymanski Gets the Ogden Slip" (2010)
- "In the Night" (2010), published in the anthology Love & Rockets, ISBN 978-0-7564-0650-9
- "The Destiny of Einar the Brave" (2011)
- "In the Shadows of Broadway" (2012), featured on the StarShipSofa podcast #236
- "The Cremator's Tale" (2013), published in Black Gate magazine
- "Hunger on Ceos" (2015)
- "Village Square" (2015)
- "Well of Tranquility" (2016), published in the anthology Genius Loci: Tales of the Spirit of Place, ISBN 978-1-944760-41-0
- "Big White Men—Attack!" (2017), published in the anthology Little Green Men—Attack!, ISBN 978-1-4767-8213-3
- "Doing Business at Hodputt's Emporium" (March 2018), published in Galaxy's Edge, Issue 31, ISBN 978-1-61242-404-0
- "A Letter Home" (2020), published in Ray Bradbury Experience Museum Newsletter, Volume 2
- "Worst in Show" (2022), published in the anthology Ludlow Charlington's Doghouse
- "Best Policy" (2022), published in the anthology Wyrms ISBN 9-798-83742-651-3
- "Initial Engagement" (2023), published in the anthology Jewish Futures ISBN 978-1-5154-5804-3
