= The Tomorrow People (novel) =

1960 novel by Judith Merril

- Cover art for The Tomorrow People
- Author: Judith Merril
- Language: English
- Genre: Science fiction
- Publisher: Pyramid
- Publication date: 1960
- Publication place: Canada
- Media type: Print (Hardcover and Paperback)

The Tomorrow People is a 1960 science fiction novel by American writer Judith Merril.

== Plot summary ==
Only one man, Johnny Wendt, has returned from the first expedition to Mars. Efforts to determine what happened to the others are in vain; four pages of the ship's log are missing, and Johnny's companion, Doug Laughlin, apparently wandered off to die in the desert. Johnny's girlfriend, Lisa Trovi, and a psychiatrist named Phil Kutler try to cure Johnny by luring him to the Moon and getting him to grapple with whatever happened on Mars. Johnny reacts so badly that they return to Earth as quickly as possible.

== Critical response ==
Damon Knight wrote of the novel:

Parts of this book are relatively painless to read: the only irritants in the dialogue are coyness, feminine overemphasis and an unaccountable sprinkling of 1960 jive talk...What is objectionable in the book is its lack of any internal discipline, either in the writing or the thinking. Under the crisp surface it is soft and saccharine: wherever you bite it, custard dribbles out. Is this the "woman's viewpoint"? I don't believe it; I think it is the woman's-magazine viewpoint, from which God preserve us.

David V. Barrett wrote in The Independent:

The Tomorrow People (1960), a psychological mystery, is generally thought less emotionally powerful than her earlier work.

Elisabeth Carey wrote:

Despite some obvious changes in background assumptions (the Cold War, and what a pregnancy outside of marriage means socially), this is still a solid, interesting, enjoyable short novel.
