= First Flight: Maiden Voyages in Space and Time =

1963 anthology edited by Damon Knight

- Editor: Damon Knight
- Cover artist: Ed Emshwiller
- Language: English
- Genre: Science fiction
- Publisher: Lancer Books
- Publication date: 1963
- Publication place: United States
- Media type: Print (paperback)
- Pages: 160

First Flight: Maiden Voyages in Space and Time is an anthology of science fiction short stories edited by American author and critic Damon Knight, first published in paperback by Lancer Books in August 1963. It is a compilation of the first published stories of ten authors in the genre. It was reprinted in November 1966 and reissued as Now Begins Tomorrow in November 1969 by the same publisher. An expansion of the work, retaining Knight's introduction and adding the initial stories of ten additional authors, was later prepared by Martin H. Greenberg and Joseph D. Olander and published as First Voyages by Avon Books in May 1981.

== Contents ==
- "Introduction" by Damon Knight
- "The Isolinguals" (1937) by L. Sprague de Camp
- "The Faithful" (1938) by Lester del Rey
- "Black Destroyer" (1939) by A. E. van Vogt
- "Life-Line" (1939) by Robert A. Heinlein
- "Ether Breather" (1939) by Theodore Sturgeon
- "Loophole" (1946) by Arthur C. Clarke
- "Tomorrow's Children" (1947) by Poul Anderson
- "That Only a Mother" (1948) by Judith Merril
- "Walk to the World" (1952) by Algis Budrys
- "T" (1956) by Brian Aldiss
