= England Swings SF =

Speculative fiction short story anthology

England Swings SF: Stories of Speculative Fiction
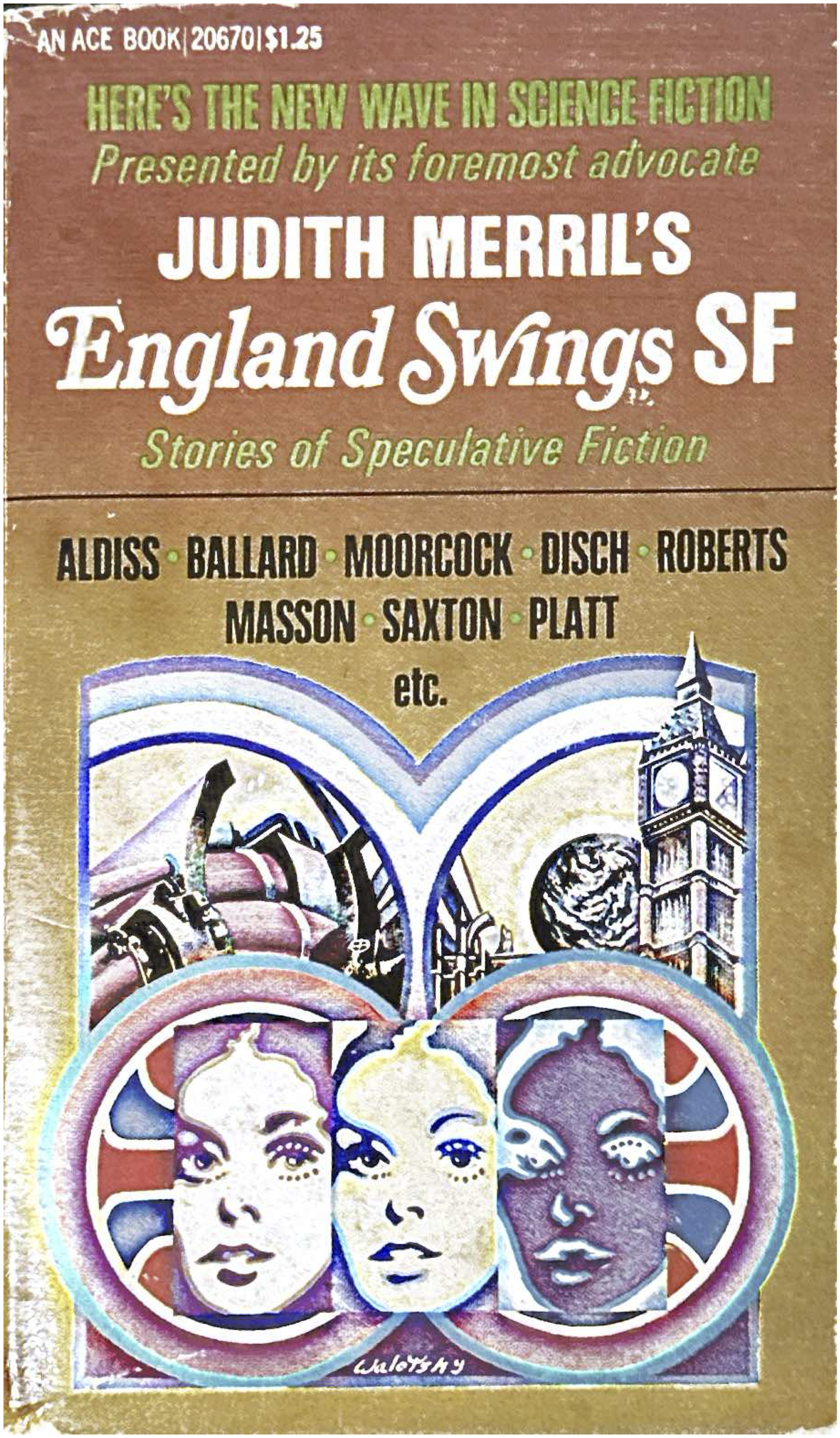
- Cover of the Ace Books paperback edition
- Editor: Judith Merril
- Language: English
- Genre: Speculative fiction
- Publisher: Doubleday
- Publication date: 1968
- Publication place: United States
- Media type: Print (Hardcover & Paperback)
- Pages: 406

England Swings SF is an anthology of experimental literature edited by Judith Merril. Published with the subtitle "Stories of Speculative Fiction" in 1968, it champions the burgeoning new wave of science fiction. The selections for the anthology are predominated by contributors to the British magazine New Worlds, whom Merril met on her trips to London. At a time of growing civil unrest in the United States, the anthology shows how Merril sought to inspire a new kind of countercultural science fiction before abandoning the U.S., living the rest of her life in Canada.

== Merril and the New Wave ==
In this anthology, Merril embraces an experimental and countercultural current in what she had begun to call "SF," which could stand for "science fiction" as well as other terms, like "speculative fiction". With this anthology, Merril hoped to inspire readers and writers in the U.S. to break free of the constraints of pulp giants like Analog Science Fact / Science Fiction.

The anthology came about from Merril's trips to London, at a time when she was the book review editor of The Magazine of Fantasy & Science Fiction. She lived in London for the better part of a year from 1966 to 1967, spending time with Michael Moorcock, the editor of the British magazine New Worlds, and networking with other avant-garde authors. In her book review column, she started to write "about something new and different happening in British science fiction" even though she never used the phrase that would characterize the movement, the New Wave.

The word "swings" in the title is explained in some of Merril's editorial notes. After Josephine Saxton's story, Merril notes that it could not have been published outside the milieu that "makes London swing." In the notes to Charles Platt's story, Merril notes that "England does swing, but nothing like a pendulum." Instead, swing refers to the effects of "an active ferment in the arts." Writing two years after the anthology first appeared, an editor wrote that it represents the feeling that older science fiction is "stereotyped" and that it "no longer represents the whirl of modern times, the revolution of new thinking and the mind-tingling innovations that seem to be prevalent in all the arts these days."

The theme of the anthology can be understood as an analogy to the British Invasion of rock 'n' roll earlier in the decade. The introduction to the original (1968) Doubleday edition included references to the Beatles album Sgt. Pepper's Lonely Hearts Club Band (these quotations were not included in the subsequent paperback editions, however). The selection of authors, many of them associated with the British science fiction magazine New Worlds, offered a literary alternative to the pulp science fiction popular in the United States, which was published in the magazine Analog, edited by John W. Campbell. The anthology reflects Merril's effort to promote a new kind of science fiction that could "transcend narrow generic boundaries."

Merril first started publishing anthologies in 1950 with Shot in the Dark when she was working for Bantam Books; this collection (and a handful of other thematic volumes) offered a melange of authors, some familiar who had been previously published in science fiction and others, like James Thurber, who were not often thought of as science fiction writers. However, England Swings SF came after Merril edited twelve "best of" anthologies from 1956 to 1968 that sought to republish what she considered to be the most effective stories published in the previous year. England Swings SF offers a more speculative selection of experimental fiction, in some ways returning to Merril's early work on anthologies that suggested what science fiction could be, not just what it was currently.

The experimental nature of the fiction is matched by Merril's role as editor. The notes on contributors combine material submitted by the authors, aligned left in sans serif font; these are interleaved with comments from Merril, with serif font. Occasional quotes from other sources are block quotes aligned in the center of the column.

This anthology came at a time of political turmoil in the United States, and Merril was feeling consternation with the science fiction genre as represented by the U.A. pulps. The selection of avant-garde work for this anthology was not just a desire for formal experimentation. In the same year that the anthology was published, Merril and her friend Kate Wilhelm organized an advertisement against the war in Southeast Asia for science fiction magazines. However, she was disappointed by the negative reaction from some people in the genre she thought of as allies. Feeling considerable alienation, at the end of the year she left the United States and lived the rest of her life in Canada.

== Reception ==
Robert J. Hughes, reviewing the anthology in the Magazine of Fantasy & Science Fiction, notes that much of the work in Merril's anthology "resembles modern poetry and avant-garde literature," and the authors are more at home in little magazines instead of "commercial sales". P. Schuyler Miller, reviewing the anthology the next year in Analog, points out that it does not include any stories that seem like they could have appeared in Analog: "call it the New Wave or the New Thing ... England appears to be its Mecca and Judith Merril its sibyl."

In some ways, the anthology's reputation was eclipsed by Harlan Ellison's 1967 anthology Dangerous Visions. One marker of the notability of Merril's anthology is that her introduction was included in a 1996 anthology, endorsed by the Science Fiction Research Association, of important statements about the genre.

== Contents ==
In addition to the 24 stories in the collection, Merril included 4 science fiction poems.

- "England Swings SF," an introductory prose poem by Judith Merril
- "The Island" (1965), a short story by Roger Jones, who taught English to foreigners, according to Merril.
- "Ne déjà vu pas" (1967), a short story by Josephine Saxton, an author who was published in science fiction and literary magazines.
- "Signals" (1966), a short story by John Calder, his first science fiction story.
- "Saint 505" (1967), a short story by John Clark, a professor of psychology.
- "The Singular Quest of Martin Borg" (1965), a short story by George Collyn, a media professional.
- "The First Gorilla on the Moon" (1968), a poem by Bill Butler, a bookstore proprietor.
- "Blastoff" (1964), a short story by Kyril Bonfiglioli, a rare-book proprietor and art gallery director.
- "You and Me and the Continuum" (1966), a short story by J. G. Ballard, whom Merril and some of the contributors mention as their inspiration.
- "Who's in There with Me?" (1968), a short story by Daphne Castell, who was published in British science fiction magazines as well as the popular press.
- "The Squirrel Cage" (1966), a short story by Thomas M. Disch, who had been publishing a new kind of fiction in New Worlds.
- "Manscarer" (1966), a short story by Keith Roberts, an author from the U.S. who had been publishing in New Worlds.
- "The Total Experience Kick" (1966), a short story by Charles Platt, design editor for New Worlds.
- "The Silver Needle" (1967), a poem by George MacBeth, poet, actor, and avant-garde theater director.
- "The Baked Bean Factory" (1967), a short story by Michael Butterworth, whom Merril calls the "Very Model of a Young New Worlds Writer."
- "The Hall of Machines" (1968), a short story by Langdon Jones, a New Worlds author and a photographer.
- "The Run" (1966), a short story by Chris Priest, a New Worlds author.
- "All the King's Men" (1965), a short story by B. J. Bayley, a New Worlds author who had not been previously published in the United States.
- "Still Trajectories" (1967), a short story by author and editor Brian W. Aldiss
- "Sun Push" (1967), a short story by Graham M. Hall, journalist and New Worlds author.
- "Report on a Supermarket" (1968), a poem by Michael Hamburger, who was well known as a translator of German poetry.
- "Dr. Gelabius" (1968), a short story by Hilary Bailey, whom Merril notes is the wife of Michael Moorcock.
- "The Heat Death of the Universe" (1967), a short story by P. A. Zoline, from the U.S. but living abroad.
- "The Mountain" (1965), a short story by Michael Moorcock. The editor of New Worlds, he sold his first story to the magazine's founder in 1959.
- "Psychosmosis" (1966), a short story by David I. Masson, a rare-book dealer whom Merril had previously anthologized in her "best of" series.
- "The Idea of Entropy at Maenporth Beach" (1967), a poem by Peter Redgrove, who read science at Cambridge University.
- "Same Autumn in a Different Park" (1967), a short story by Peter Tate, a journalist and New Worlds author.
- "The Assassination of John Fitzgerald Kennedy Considered as a Downhill Motor Race" (1966), a short story by J. G. Ballard
- "Plan for the Assassination of Jacqueline Kennedy" (1966), a short story by J. G. Ballard. In her note following these stories, Merril says that Ballard is "one of the most courageous writers nowadays" due to his ability to "consistently surpass the field and stand outside it."
