= Shadow on the Hearth =

1950 novel by Judith Merril

- Dust-jacket from the first edition
- Author: Judith Merril
- Cover artist: Edward Kasper
- Language: English
- Genre: Science fiction
- Publisher: Doubleday Books
- Publication date: 1950
- Publication place: United States
- Media type: Print (Hardback)
- Pages: 277

Shadow on the Hearth is a science fiction novel by American writer Judith Merril, originally published in hardcover by Doubleday in 1950. It was her first novel. A British hardcover was published by Sidgwick & Jackson in 1953, with a paperback following from Compact Books in 1966. Italian translations appeared in 1956 and 1992; a German translation was issued in 1982. It was included in Spaced Out: Three Novels of Tomorrow, a 2008 NESFA Press omnibus compiling all Merril's novels (the other two written in collaboration with Cyril M. Kornbluth). No American paperback of Shadow on the Hearth has ever been published, although a book club edition appeared.

Shadow on the Hearth tells the story of "a Westchester woman and her two children after the explosion of a series of atomic bombs on New York". Merril described it as "a very political novel, ... written for political reasons".

Merril began writing Shadow on the Hearth as a short story; "When it reached ten thousand words," she remembered, "I began to understand that it wanted to be a novel." Although she stopped working on the piece when it reached twice that length, needing to spend more time with her young daughter, Doubleday editor Walter I. Bradbury read the incomplete draft and bought the novel. Merril quit her editorial job at Bantam to complete it. When she completed it, Doubleday imposed its own title (avoiding any mention of nuclear war), revising the text to create a happier ending, and wrapping the novel in a nondescript dust jacket. "On the cover was an attractive young mother, obviously in great distress: it could have been a gothic novel", Merril later groused, "or basically anything".

In 1954, the Motorola TV Theatre aired an adaptation of Shadow on the Hearth, retitled Atomic Attack.

== Reception ==
New York Times reviewer Charles Poore described Shadow on the Hearth as "a rather chintzy account of what happened to a Westchester family when the atomic bombs began to burst through the American air", noting that Merril "concentrate[s] on the creation of believable leading characters" and concluding that the novel "is generally entertaining reading, even if . . . not always for the reasons intended by the author". Another Times reviewer, John Cournos, received the novel unfavorably, saying its story "seems more like a somewhat uncomfortable picnic than a manifestation of a catastrophe".

Genre reviewers viewed Merril's effort more favorably. Groff Conklin described Shadow on the Hearth as "a masterly example of sensitive and perceptive story-telling." Boucher and McComas praised it as "a sensitively human novel, terrifying in its small-scale reflection of grand-scale catastrophe." P. Schuyler Miller found it a "warm, human novel" comparable to Earth Abides. Startling Stories declared that "its beautifully rendered interlocking series of incidents and events . . . creates an almost too-vivid picture for the reader of what life in the very near future may become". Kenneth F. Slater wrote in Nebula Science Fiction that "The emotions you will find here are in places hard and brutal, not softly sentimental". Future Science Fiction. however, dismissed the novel for its "'true confession' level of writing".

More recent reviewers also rate the novel highly. Lisa Yaszek writes that Shadow on the Hearth "is one of the only postwar holocaust narratives that manages to work its way out from under the paralyzing shadow of the mushroom cloud and to imagine the possibility of women -- and men -- working together to build a more peaceful and rational future". Judith Merril: A Critical Study notes that "contemporary critics respect Merril's novel for its originality in domesticating nuclear attack -- hence the story's power and darkness". David Seed reports the novel is "universally praised . . . for its understated method, avoidance of melodrama and unusually oblique description of nuclear attack". M. Keith Booker declares that Shadow on the Hearth is "a relatively daring novel" and "a useful corrective to the heroic vision of post apocalypse life".
