= SF: The Year's Greatest Science Fiction and Fantasy =

1956 anthology edited by Judith Merril

- Dust-jacket from the first edition
- Author: edited by Judith Merril
- Cover artist: Ed Emshwiller
- Language: English
- Genre: Science fiction and fantasy
- Publisher: Gnome Press
- Publication date: 1956
- Publication place: United States
- Media type: Print (hardback)
- Pages: 352 pp
- OCLC: 3926583
- Followed by: SF '57: The Year's Greatest Science Fiction and Fantasy

SF: The Year's Greatest Science Fiction and Fantasy is a 1956 anthology of science fiction and fantasy short stories edited by Judith Merril. It was the first in a series of 12 annual anthologies edited by Merrill. Most of the stories originally appeared in the magazines Astounding, Fantasy and Science Fiction, Galaxy Science Fiction, Fantastic Universe, Science-Fantasy, If, Good Housekeeping and Bluebook.

== Contents ==
- Introduction, by Orson Welles
- Preface, by Judith Merril
- "The Stutterer", by R. R. Merliss
- "The Golem", by Avram Davidson
- "Junior", by Robert Abernathy
- "The Cave of Night", by James E. Gunn
- "The Hoofer", by Walter M. Miller, Jr.
- "Bulkhead", by Theodore Sturgeon
- "Sense from Thought Divide", by Mark Clifton
- "Pottage", by Zenna Henderson
- "Nobody Bothers Gus", by Algis Budrys
- "The Last Day of Summer", by E. C. Tubb
- "One Ordinary Day, with Peanuts", by Shirley Jackson
- "The Ethicators", by Willard Marsh
- "Birds Can’t Count", by Mildred Clingerman
- "Of Missing Persons", by Jack Finney
- "Dreaming Is a Private Thing", by Isaac Asimov
- "The Country of the Kind", by Damon Knight
- "The Public Hating", by Steve Allen
- "Home There’s No Returning", by Henry Kuttner & C. L. Moore
- "The Year’s S-F, Summation and Honorable Mentions", by Judith Merril
