= SF '59: The Year's Greatest Science Fiction and Fantasy =

1959 anthology edited by Judith Merril

- Dust-jacket from the first edition
- Author: edited by Judith Merril
- Cover artist: W.I. Van der Poel
- Language: English
- Genre: Science fiction and fantasy
- Publisher: Gnome Press
- Publication date: 1959
- Publication place: United States
- Media type: Print (hardback)
- Pages: 256 pp
- OCLC: 3664877
- Preceded by: SF '58: The Year's Greatest Science Fiction and Fantasy
- Followed by: The 5th Annual of the Year’s Best S-F

SF '59: The Year's Greatest Science Fiction and Fantasy is a 1959 anthology of science fiction and fantasy short stories and articles edited by Judith Merril. It was published by Gnome Press in an edition of 5,000 copies, some of which were never bound. It was the fourth in a series of 12 annual anthologies edited by Merrill. Most of the stories and articles originally appeared in the magazines Fantasy and Science Fiction, Astounding, Playboy, The Saturday Evening Post, If, Galaxy Science Fiction, Nebula, Science-Fantasy, Fantastic Universe, Venture, Lilliput, The New Yorker and Future.

== Contents ==
- Introduction, by Judith Merril
- "Pelt", by Carol Emshwiller
- "Triggerman", by J. F. Bone
- "The Prize of Peril", by Robert Sheckley
- "Hickory, Dickory, Kerouac", by Richard Gehman
- "The Yellow Pill", by Rog Phillips
- "River of Riches", by Gerald Kersh
- "Satellite Passage", by Theodore L. Thomas
- "Casey Agonistes", by Richard M. McKenna
- "Space-Time for Springers", by Fritz Leiber
- "Or All the Seas with Oysters", by Avram Davidson
- "Ten-Story Jigsaw", by Brian W. Aldiss
- "Fresh Guy", by E. C. Tubb
- "The Beautiful Things", by Arthur Zirul
- "The Comedian’s Children", by Theodore Sturgeon
- "The Short-Short Story of Mankind", by John Steinbeck
- "From Science Fiction to Science Fact: The Universe"
- "Man in Space", by Daniel Lang
- "Rockets to Where?", by Judith Merril
- "The Thunder-Thieves", by Isaac Asimov
- "The Year’s S-F, Summation and Honorable Mentions", by Judith Merril
