= SF '58: The Year's Greatest Science Fiction and Fantasy =

1958 anthology edited by Judith Merril

- Dust-jacket from the first edition
- Author: edited by Judith Merril
- Cover artist: W.I. Van der Poel
- Language: English
- Genre: Science fiction and fantasy
- Publisher: Gnome Press
- Publication date: 1958
- Publication place: United States
- Media type: Print (hardback)
- Pages: 255 pp
- OCLC: 7245779
- Preceded by: SF '57: The Year's Greatest Science Fiction and Fantasy
- Followed by: SF '59: The Year's Greatest Science Fiction and Fantasy

SF '58: The Year's Greatest Science Fiction and Fantasy is a 1958 anthology of science fiction and fantasy short stories and articles edited by Judith Merril. It was published by Gnome Press in an edition of 4,000 copies of which 1,263 were never bound. It was the third in a series of 12 annual anthologies edited by Merrill. Most of the stories and articles originally appeared in the magazines Science-Fantasy, Playboy, Infinity Science Fiction, Atlantic Monthly, Fantasy and Science Fiction, If, Venture, Mademoiselle, Boys' Life and The New York Times.

== Contents ==
- Introduction, by Judith Merril
- "Let’s Be Frank", by Brian W. Aldiss
- "The Fly", by George Langelaan
- "Let's Get Together", by Isaac Asimov
- "The Wonder Horse", by George Byram
- "You Know Willie", by Theodore R. Cogswell
- "Near Miss", by Henry Kuttner
- "Game Preserve", by Rog Phillips
- "Now Let Us Sleep", by Avram Davidson
- "Wilderness", by Zenna Henderson
- "Flying High", by Eugène Ionesco
- "The Edge of the Sea", by Algis Budrys
- "How Near Is the Moon?", by Judith Merril
- "Transition—from Fantasy to Science", by Arthur C. Clarke
- "Sputnik: One Reason Why We Lost", by G. Harry Stine
- "Going Up!", by Dennis Driscoll
- "Where Do We Go from Here?", by Willy Ley
- "Science Fiction Still Leads Science Fact", by Anthony Boucher
- "The Year’s S-F, Summation and Honorable Mentions", by Judith Merril
