= SF '57: The Year's Greatest Science Fiction and Fantasy =

1957 anthology edited by Judith Merril

- Dust-jacket from the first edition
- Author: edited by Judith Merril
- Cover artist: W.I. Van der Poel
- Language: English
- Genre: Science fiction and fantasy
- Publisher: Gnome Press
- Publication date: 1957
- Publication place: United States
- Media type: Print (hardback)
- Pages: 320 pp
- OCLC: 1376686
- Preceded by: SF: The Year's Greatest Science Fiction and Fantasy
- Followed by: SF '58: The Year's Greatest Science Fiction and Fantasy

SF '57: The Year's Greatest Science Fiction and Fantasy is a 1957 anthology of science fiction and fantasy short stories edited by Judith Merril. It was published by Gnome Press in an edition of 3,000 copies and was the second in a series of 12 annual anthologies edited by Merrill. Most of the stories originally appeared in the magazines Infinity Science Fiction, Fantasy and Science Fiction, Astounding, The London Observer, Future, Science Fiction Stories, Playboy, Harper's Magazine, Tiger, Fantastic Universe, Science-Fantasy, Galaxy Science Fiction and Esquire.

== Contents ==
- "The Man Who Liked Lions", by John Bernard Daley
- "The Cosmic Expense Account", by C. M. Kornbluth
- "The Far Look", by Theodore L. Thomas
- "When Grandfather Flew to the Moon", by E. L. Malpass
- "The Doorstop", by Reginald Bretnor
- "Silent Brother", by Algis Budrys
- "Stranger Station", by Damon Knight
- "Each an Explorer", by Isaac Asimov
- "All About 'The Thing'", by Randall Garrett
- "Put Them All Together, They Spell Monster", by Ray Russell
- "Digging the Weans", by Robert Nathan
- "Take a Deep Breath", by Roger Thorne
- "Grandma’s Lie Soap", by Robert Abernathy
- "Compounded Interest", by Mack Reynolds
- "Prima Belladonna", by J. G. Ballard
- "The Other Man", by Theodore Sturgeon
- "The Damnedest Thing", by Garson Kanin
- "Anything Box", by Zenna Henderson
- "The Year’s S-F, Summation and Honorable Mentions", by Judith Merril
