= Ten from Tomorrow =

1966 collection of short stories by E. C. Tubb

- First edition
- Author: E. C. Tubb
- Language: English
- Publisher: Hart-Davis
- Publication date: 1966
- Publication place: United Kingdom
- Media type: Print (hardback & paperback)
- Pages: 187 pp.
- OCLC: 954478

Ten from Tomorrow is a collection of science fiction short stories (see Index to Science Fiction Anthologies and Collections) by E. C. Tubb, published in 1966. It includes:

- "The Ming Vase"
- "Tell the Truth"
- "The Last Day of Summer"
- "Fresh Guy"
- "Vigil"
- "Piebald Horse"
- "Sense of Proportion"
- "Greater Than Infinity"
- "Last of the Morticians"
- "Worm in the Woodwork"
