= First Voyages =

- First edition
- Editors: Damon Knight, Martin H. Greenberg and Joseph D. Olander
- Language: English
- Genre: Science fiction
- Publisher: Avon Books
- Publication date: 1981
- Publication place: United States
- Media type: Print (Paperback)
- Pages: 373
- ISBN: 0-380-77586-7

First Voyages is an anthology of science fiction short stories edited by Damon Knight, Martin H. Greenberg and Joseph D. Olander, first published in paperback by Avon Books in May 1981. It is a compilation of the first published stories of twenty prominent authors in the genre, and an expansion of Knight's earlier First Flight: Maiden Voyages in Space and Time (Lancer Books, 1963), which covered ten of the same stories and authors.

== Contents ==
- "Introduction" (1963) by Damon Knight
- "The Isolinguals" (1937) by L. Sprague de Camp
- "The Faithful" (1938) by Lester del Rey
- "Black Destroyer" (1939) by A. E. van Vogt
- "Life-Line" (1939) by Robert A. Heinlein
- "Ether Breather" (1939) by Theodore Sturgeon
- "Proof" (1942) by Hal Clement
- "Loophole" (1946) by Arthur C. Clarke
- "Tomorrow's Children" (1947) by Poul Anderson
- "That Only a Mother" (1948) by Judith Merril
- "Scanners Live in Vain" (1950) by Cordwainer Smith
- "Time Trap" (1948) by Charles L. Harness
- "Defense Mechanism" (1949) by Katherine MacLean
- "Angel's Egg" (1951) by Edgar Pangborn
- "Come On, Wagon!" (1951) by Zenna Henderson
- "Walk to the World" (1952) by Algis Budrys
- "Beyond Lies the Wub" (1952) by Philip K. Dick
- "My Boy Friend's Name is Jello" (1954) by Avram Davidson
- "T" (1956) by Brian Aldiss
- "Prima Belladonna" (1956) by J. G. Ballard
- "April in Paris" (1962) by Ursula K. Le Guin
