= Emily Pohl-Weary =

Canadian writer, university professor, and magazine editor

- Born: 1973 (age 52–53); Toronto, Ontario, Canada
- Occupations: Writer, editor
- Writing career
- Period: 2000–present
- Genres: Biography, YA fiction, comics, science fiction
- Notable work: Better to Have Loved: The Life of Judith Merril
- Website: emilypohlweary.com

Emily Pohl-Weary (born 1973) is a Canadian novelist, poet, university professor, and magazine editor. She is the granddaughter of science fiction writers and editors Judith Merril and Frederik Pohl.

== Life ==
Pohl-Weary is an author and creative writing professor who was born in Toronto, Ontario, Canada. Her most-recent book is Ghost Sick, poetry about tragedy and resilience in the Toronto neighbourhood where she grew up. Her previous books include the young adult novel, Not Your Ordinary Wolf Girl, as well as a Hugo Award-winning biography, a female superhero anthology, a poetry collection, and a girl pirate comic.

== Literary career ==
Pohl-Weary's second collection of poems, Ghost Sick: A Poetry of Witness won the 2016 Fred Cogswell Award for Excellence in Poetry. Canada's Parliamentary Poet George Elliott Clarke reviewed it thusly in the Halifax Chronicle: "Like Holocaust witness poet Paul Celan, Pohl-Weary checks tabloids, billboards, newsflashes, for the language to bespeak domesticated violence."

Her biography of her grandmother Judith Merril, Better to Have Loved: The Life of Judith Merril (Between the Lines Books), won the Hugo Award for Best Related Book in 2003 and was a finalist for the Toronto Book Award.

Pohl-Weary's first novel, A Girl Like Sugar, was published by McGilligan Books in 2004. It features a twenty-something girl haunted by her dead rock star boyfriend. She also edited a critically acclaimed female superhero anthology, Girls Who Bite Back: Witches Mutants, Slayers and Freaks (2004). Her subsequent books include a collection of poetry, Iron-on Constellations (2005) and the novel Strange Times at Western High (2006), featuring zine-publishing teen sleuth Natalie Fuentes, who teams up with a computer hacker and a graffiti artist to solve crime at her Toronto high school. Her most recent book is the young adult novel Not Your Ordinary Wolf Girl (2013), about a musician who gets bitten by a vicious dog in Central Park and finds herself changing in unusual ways.

In 2008, she founded the Toronto Street Writers, a free writing group for inner-city youth in the neighbourhood where she grew up. For three years, she led a weekly writing workshop for residents of Sagatay (Na-Me-Res), a long-term transitional home for First Nations, Metis and Inuit men in Toronto. Her writing workshops focus on writing skills, creative empowerment, learning tools for conflict-resolution, and drawing out participants' unique voices and stories.

For eight years, Pohl-Weary published and wrote for Kiss Machine magazine, which ceased publication in 2008. She is also a former editor of Broken Pencil magazine. In October 2022, Pohl-Weary released the audio drama The Witch's Circle, based on Russian folklore, as part of Odyssey Theatre's podcast series The Other Path.

== Books ==
- Better to Have Loved: The Life of Judith Merril, Merrill and Pohl-Weary (Between the Lines Books, 2002), ISBN 1-896357-57-1
- Girls Who Bite Back: Witches, Mutants, Slayers and Freaks (Sumach Press, 2004), anthology edited, LCCN 2004-463379
- A Girl Like Sugar (Toronto: McGilligan Books, 2004), young adult novel, LCCN 2004-281045
- Violet Miranda, Pohl-Weary and Willow Dawson, Strange Horizons (Feb 2005–Aug 2005), 24-part graphic novel
- Iron-on Constellations (Tightrope Books, 2005), poems, LCCN 2005-482494
- Strange Times at Western High (Annick Press, 2006), YA mystery novel
- Not Your Ordinary Wolf Girl (Penguin Canada and Amazon Skyscape, 2013), YA supernatural novel
- Ghost Sick: A Poetry of Witness (Tightrope Books, 2015), poetry
- How to Be Found (Arsenal Pulp, 2023), young adult novel
