= The Isolinguals =

- Short story by L. Sprague de Camp
- Elliott Dold, Jr.'s illustration of the story in Astounding Stories
- Country: United States
- Language: English
- Genre: Science fiction

Publication
- Published in: Astounding Stories
- Publisher: Street & Smith Publications, Inc.
- Media type: Print (Magazine)
- Publication date: September, 1937

"The Isolinguals" is a science fiction story, addressing the concept of ancestral memory, by American writer L. Sprague de Camp. It was his first published story. It was first published in the magazine Astounding Stories for September, 1937, and first appeared in book form in the anthology First Flight: Maiden Voyages in Space and Time (Lancer Books, Aug. 1963; reprinted Nov. 1966 and Nov. 1969 (as Now Begins Tomorrow). It later appeared in the anthologies First Voyages (Avon Books, May 1981), Tales in Time (White Wolf Publishing, Apr. 1997), and Wondrous Beginnings (DAW Books, Jan. 2003), as well as the de Camp collection Years in the Making: the Time-Travel Stories of L. Sprague de Camp (NESFA Press, 2005).

== Plot summary ==
In a future New York City, cases of an odd and unexplainable dementia begin cropping up. Victims transition in an instant from a normal state into one in which their speech is usually unintelligible and they behave in confused or bizarre fashions. The story cuts back and forth between scenes of victims as they are stricken by the condition and the investigators grappling with the mystery. It develops that a sufferer is not in fact crazy but rather suddenly possessed of the persona and memories of an ancestor, right down to the archaic dialect or language that ancestor spoke.

Fruit vendor Niccolo Franchetti is conversing with a policeman when something goes "ping" inside his head and he becomes Decimus Agricola, an ancient Roman legionary who a moment before, as he believes, has been involved in a battle with the Parthians. Confused at the change in scene, he reacts in panic.

The victims are referred to the psychiatric department of the Rockefeller Institute for Medical Research, headed by Bill Jenkens, but their condition baffles the staff. At Jenkins's request, investigating psychiatrist Pierre Lamarque calls in outside aid—his father-in-law Arthur Lindsley, a professor of biology, and some of his academic colleagues in linguistics. The initial break comes when one of these, Dr. Fedor Jevsky, recognizes that one victim, a Mrs. Garfinkle, is speaking ancient Gothic. Another comes with the questioning of Mike Watrous, a sufferer speaking an archaic but intelligible English, who believes he is actually Sgt. Ronald Blake, a soldier of Cromwell's army in the year 1648.

Anti-Semitic demagogue Hans Rumpel is addressing a rally, when to the consternation of his audience his mind gives way to that of Rabbi Levi ben Eliezer, a Polish Jew from 1784.

Meanwhile, Lindsley and Lamarque discuss the unfolding situation. They have taken steps to send their loved ones to safety as the city's hospitals fill with victims.

H. Perkins, a church congregant, is passing the collection plate among the pews when he is overtaken by the persona of pirate Joshua Hardy, and absconds with the offering.

Lindsley and Lamarque continue to brainstorm as the dementia rapidly spreads into a regional epidemic and a mass exodus of citizens clogs the roads out of New York. They discuss some new cases—a bus driver who came down with the condition and crashed his bus, their colleague the mathematical professor Graham Calderwood, who has turned into Scottish clansman Gavin MacTaggart, and biological student Arne Holmgren, who now thinks he's a Viking.

Chase Burge, Jr., awakens one morning in the belief that he is his own father, Chase Burge, Sr. Mutual confusion and consternation ensue when he then encounters the actual senior Burge.

Assessing what they have learned, Lindsley and Lamarque note that the pseudopsyches, as they now call the acquired personalities, are always those of persons who seem to have lived before the victims, that they are always those of individuals conceivably direct ancestors of the victims, that in at least some instances, and possibly all, they are of people who actually existed, and that the average age of the pseudopsyche is around thirty. Lindsley concludes: "Now suppose—just suppose—that the pseudopsyche is a piece of ancestral memory that's gotten carried along in the germ cells ... and suppose that something happens to substitute this carried-over memory for the case's real one. You'd think you're the ancestor whose memory you've been carrying around. For obvious reasons, it would end at a point before the time when the said ancestor's child from whom you're descended was conceived."

The manager of the "Venus" strip club, despondent over the drop-off in business, looks on in astonishment as Betty Fiorelli, the current performer, suspends her strip tease and begins declaiming in classical Greek. She is now Thea Tisimicles, 5th century B.C. poet of Lemnos.

Lindsley and Lamarque are being urged to leave the city by Detective Inspector Monahan, as the plague is now turning up in New Jersey and Westchester, outside the police cordons the authorities have set up around New York City. The Isolinguals, as the victims are being called, are sorting themselves by the languages they now speak, forming into bands or gangs for mutual protection. Clashes between gangs and between the gangs and the remaining normal citizens are occurring and on the rise. The detective feels "Something's fishy about this whole business." He notes recent increases in the activities of the fascist fringe Union Party, better known as the National Patriots. They appear not to fear the plague and have been filtering into New York while everyone else has been trying to get out. He suspects they, or rather their leader, the would-be dictator Slidell, may somehow be responsible for the outbreak.

Lindsley and Lamarque leave the hospital with Monahan to try to catch one of Slidell's blockade runners. The streets are largely deserted, and littered with occasional bodies. The whole northeast of the country is well on the way to becoming a wilderness inhabited solely by roving bands of Isolinguals in the wake of the Battle of Herald Square, in which National Guardsmen and State police scattered a horde of victims only to see their own force disintegrate as many of them fell victim to the plague themselves.

The three soon note that every one of the occasional National Patriots they see is wearing a headpiece resembling a football helmet. Guessing it to be a protection against the plague, they ambush an NP and confiscate his helmet. Back at the hospital, Lindsley and his colleagues analyze it and wire the specifications to Albany and Washington.

Monahan and the academics finally attempt to escape the city, but when their truck crashes they are forced to take refuge from the Isolinguals in a vandalized drug store. With the aid of store clerk Mr. Bloom they hold off the attackers until finally relieved by an armored car full of soldiers wearing the newly duplicated helmets. Lamarque succumbs to the plague but returns to his senses when an extra helmet is forced onto his head.

Afterwards, the army surrounds the redoubt of the National Patriots from which the radiation causing the plague has been emanating; the academics’ colleague Dr. Plotnik had triangulated the source. The troops make short work of the fascists and capture Slidell and his "master mind," a Dr. Falk. The whole story of Slidell's diabolic scheme comes out. Per Lamarque: "Seems [Falk] found a complicated combination of harmonics on a long radio wave that would work this ancestral-memory switch, and he and Slidell figured to disorganize the whole country with it. And when his broadcasting set was turned off and everybody became himself again, we'd find Slidell installed as dictator and the N.P.'s running everything. Of course, in the meantime they'd be wearing the helmets and would be shielded from the radiations."

== Importance ==
"The Isolinguals" is de Camp's first professional published work of fiction, showcasing the interest in history and linguistics seen in his later writings.

The unconscious retention of every human being of the memories of his or her ancestors prefigures that later postulated by Frank Herbert in his Dune Messiah (1969) and Children of Dune (1976). In the Dune novels the ability to access the ancestral memories is one inherent in characters like Alia, Leto and Ghanima, who are self-aware from birth. The minds of the Dune characters are also susceptible to being swamped by the ancestral memories. Rather than being overshadowed by one "pseudopsyche" in response to radiation, susceptible characters in Herbert's novels are always in danger of having their own personalities extinguished by the mass of ancestral personas; to prevent this, they tend to ally and share control with one strong "pseudopsyche" to hold off the others.

== Reception ==
Damon Knight, coupling de Camp with Robert A. Heinlein, Lester del Rey, A. E. van Vogt and Theodore Sturgeon, wrote that "[t]he first published story of each was distinctive, brilliant and memorable," and that it was these authors, along with a few others, "who brought the new science fiction into being." He noted that "The Isolinguals" already displayed "the wry wit of de Camp," and that "his interest in antiquity and the classics is apparent in this, the first de Camp story that ever appeared in print."

Science fiction historians Alexei and Cory Panshin call de Camp's maiden effort "lively and learned, but ... also clumsy."
