= Mari Wolf =

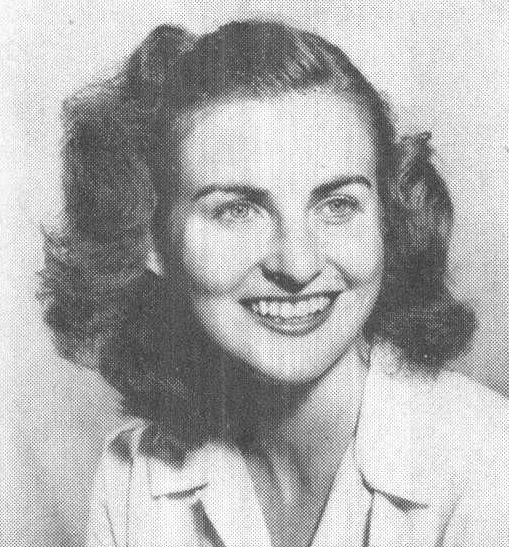
Mari Wolf

Mari Wolf (born August 27, 1926) was an American science fiction writer and magazine columnist. She is credited with the first use of the word "droid" for a robot, in a science fiction story.

== Early life ==
Mari Wolf was raised in Laguna Beach, California, and studied mathematics at the University of California Los Angeles. She was also interested in rocketry as a young woman.

== Career ==
Wolf worked in the aerospace industry in Southern California, and was described as a "calculating-machine operator" at the Jet Propulsion Laboratory in 1955. She was active in the earliest days of science fiction fandom and publishing in Los Angeles, and a member of the Los Angeles Science Fantasy Society. She wrote a monthly column about fandom, including fan conventions and fanzines. "Fandora's Box" appeared in Imagination magazine from 1951 to 1956. When she resigned from the column after her divorce, Robert Bloch took over as the feature's author.

Stories by Wolf include "Robots of the World! Arise!" (If: Worlds of Science Fiction, 1952), "An Empty Bottle" (If: Worlds of Science Fiction, 1952), "The House on the Vacant Lot" (Fantastic Story, 1952), "Prejudice" (Destiny, 1953), "The Statue" (If: Worlds of Science Fiction, 1953), "Homo Inferior" (If: Worlds of Science Fiction, 1953), "The First Day of Spring" (If: Worlds of Science Fiction, 1954), and "The Very Secret Agent" (If: Worlds of Science Fiction, 1954). The word "droid" for a robot first appears in a 1952 story by Wolf ("Robots of the World! Arise!"). Her mystery novel, The Golden Frame, was published in 1961.

A retrospective anthology, Mari Wolf Resurrected: The Complete Short Stories of Mari Wolf, was published in 2011.

== Personal life ==
Mari Wolf married fellow science fiction writer Rog Phillips in 1951, in Chicago. They divorced in 1955.
