= Nectar of Heaven =

1981 novel by Edwin Charles Tubb

Nectar of Heaven is a novel by E. C. Tubb published in 1981.

== Plot summary ==
Nectar of Heaven is a novel in which Earl Dumarest follows a fake trail as he searches to find Earth.

== Reception ==
Dave Langford reviewed Nectar of Heaven for White Dwarf #75, and stated that "again Tubb clears the ground for the next sequel with alarming efficiency: the woman with whom Dumarest's got involved is as usual wasted, and he gives away the vast wealth which would make his quest a damn sight easier."

== Reviews ==
- Review by Martyn Taylor (1986) in Paperback Inferno, #59
