= The Terra Data =

1980 novel by E. C. Tubb

First edition (publ. DAW books) Cover art by Michael Mariano

The Terra Data is a novel by E. C. Tubb published in 1980.

== Plot summary ==
The Terra Data is a novel in which Dumarest seeks knowledge.

== Reception ==
Tom Easton reviewed The Terra Data for Analog Science Fiction/Science Fact, and commented that "the Dumarest series is too blamed long. When it was new, I looked forward to six or eight more books before a final answer. Now that it is stretching toward two dozen, I am getting impatient. Come on, Tubb! Give the man a break!"

Dave Langford reviewed The Terra Data for White Dwarf #66, and stated that "hero Dumarest, tepidly pursued by omniscient yet inept Cybers, fights through unconquerable barriers of padding to obtain the secret whereabouts of lost Earth, only to suffer his 22nd failure. Soporific."
