= Years in the Making: The Time-Travel Stories of L. Sprague de Camp =

2005 collection of short stories

Years in the Making: the Time-Travel Stories of L. Sprague de Camp
- First edition
- Author: L. Sprague de Camp
- Illustrator: Bob Eggleton
- Cover artist: Bob Eggleton
- Language: English
- Genre: Science fiction
- Published: 2005 (NESFA Press)
- Publication place: United States
- Media type: Print (hardback)
- Pages: 384
- ISBN: 1-886778-47-7
- OCLC: 61287424

Years in the Making: the Time-Travel Stories of L. Sprague de Camp is a collection of science fiction stories by American author L. Sprague de Camp, edited by Mark L. Olson and illustrated by Bob Eggleton. It was first published in hardcover by NESFA Press in February 2005, with a NESFA/Science Fiction Book Club edition following in September of the same year.

== Summary ==
The book contains what the editor regards as de Camp's best science fiction stories and essays concerning time travel. It is the first in a projected series of the author's works. It also contains an introduction by Harry Turtledove, often regarded as de Camp's literary heir.

== Contents ==
- "Introduction" by Harry Turtledove.
- "The Wheels of If". Allister Park, a prosecutor and local politician is thrown into a parallel universe where due to very minor differences in the course of history, North America has been settled by descendants of the Vikings and New York is replaced by New Belfast. He endeavors to get back into his own universe using his ingenuity to gain influence in his new surroundings.
- "Tiger in the Rain" (poem).
- "Balsamo’s Mirror". College student Willy Newbury and a friend (an unnamed H. P. Lovecraft) nostalgic for pre-industrial times encounter a mystic who claims to possess the mirror of Nostradamus, which she claims allowed that prophet to experience other eras. Trying it out, the two find their minds trapped in the bodies of a pair of eighteenth-century yeomen poaching on the manor of a squire who covets their land. Presented with the legal excuse to kill them, the squire does so; the trauma returns Willy and his friend to their own bodies and time, where they find the mirror broken and the mystic dead of a heart attack. Willy's friend decides the past isn't what it's cracked up to be.
- "Time" (poem).
- "Aristotle and the Gun". Sherman Weaver appropriates a time machine to project himself back to ancient Greece in the time of Philip II of Macedon, planning to instruct Aristotle in the scientific method and so create a more advanced present. Passing himself as a visitor from India, Weaver demonstrates marvels to the astounded sage, but falls afoul of the young prince Alexander and an official who suspects him of being a spy for the king of Persia. Preserved from a dire fate when his time projection wears off and returns him to the present, Weaver finds himself in a new pickle; his wonders had overwhelmed Aristotle, who swore off science entirely, resulting in a modern world mired in a prolonged medieval era. Since his time machine now was never invented, Weaver is unable to go back again and correct his mistake.
- "Language for Time-Travelers" (essay). De Camp explores an issue hitherto ignored by writers of time-travel fiction; the barriers to communication in the eras visited by time-travelers posed by natural language change. Examples of the difficulties involved are humorously explored through the fictional tribulations of one such traveler confronted with various linguistic scenarios.
- "Faunas" (poem).
- "The Gnarly Man". Shining Hawk, a Neanderthal man rendered ageless by a lightning strike, has survived into modern times by keeping a low profile. Currently posting as one Clarence Gaffney, he is found out by scientist Matilda Sandler, at whose urging he warily agrees to submit to medical examination in return for surgery to correct some old injuries. But when Sandler develops a romantic interest in him and the prospective surgeon is discovered plotting to dissect him to achieve medical fame, Gaffney bolts.
- "Reward of Virtue" (poem).
- "A Gun for Dinosaur". Time-traveling hunter Reginald Rivers turns down a prospective client of his time safari business on the grounds that he is not big enough to hunt the dinosaurs of the Cretaceous period. To justify his decision he tells an extended anecdote from a previous expedition. Courtney James was an arrogant and spoiled playboy; August Holtzinger was a small, timid man. Holtzinger's small size made him incapable of handling the heavy weaponry needed to take down dinosaurs, but he was allowed on the safari with a lighter caliber weapon. James' reckless shooting roused a slumbering Tyrannosaurus, from which Holtzinger tried to save him, but his gun was not powerful enough to kill it, and it snapped him up. Rivers and James each blamed the other for Holtzinger's death, and the trip was aborted. Furious, James later tried to go back in time again and assassinate Rivers' past self. The space-time continuum avoided this paradox by spontaneously snapping James back to the present, the violence of the passage killing him.
- "Nahr al Kalb" (poem).
- Lest Darkness Fall (novel). Archeologist Martin Padway, visiting Rome, is struck by lightning at the Pantheon and transported back in time to the Rome of 535 AD. In that period the Western Roman Empire has long since fallen, Italy is ruled by the Ostrogoths, and the Eastern Roman or Byzantine Empire is poised to invade and reconquer the peninsula in a ruinous war Padway knows will mark the onset of the Dark Ages. To prevent the impending collapse of civilization, he sets out to introduce technical innovations from his own time and is quickly embroiled in politics, becoming the power behind the Ostrogothic throne and defeating the Byzantines. Ultimately Padway stabilizes the Italo-Gothic kingdom and consolidates his reforms. Thanks to him, Europe will skip the Dark Ages; darkness will not fall.
- "Kaziranga" (poem).
- "The Isolinguals". People all over start getting possessed by the personas of ancestors, right down to the languages those ancestors spoke. Society begins to unravel amid widespread incomprehension. Scientists Lindsley and Lamarque work against time to cure this strange plague before they too are possessed and civilization collapses. The source is ultimately traced to Slidell, a would-be dictator exploiting the discovery of a rogue genius that triggers the ancestral-memory switch. Special helmets shield Slidell and his followers. Once the insidious device is destroyed, everyone returns to normal.

== Reception ==
Don D'Ammassa called the book an "essential volume for any real SF reader's library," particularly praising "A Gun for Dinosaur" and Lest Darkness Fall, "which is worth the price of admission alone."
