= Years in the Making (album) =

Compilation album by Loudon Wainwright III
- Released: September 14, 2018
- Genre: Folk
- Label: StorySound Records
- Producer: Loudon Wainwright III & Dick Connette

Professional ratings
Review scores
Source	Rating
Rolling Stone	3.5/5 stars

Years in the Making is a two-CD compilation album by Loudon Wainwright III released on September 14, 2018, by StorySound Records. The album brings together 42 songs spanning Wainwright's career, including home and live recordings, demos, studio outtakes, and interview pieces. The set, released in a hardbound book, features 60 pages of liner notes, art, photos, and documents.

The album is arranged roughly by topic and chronology. Its tracks, most of which were previously unreleased, are divided into seven "chapters": Folk, Rocking Out and Kids on disc one and Love Hurts, Miscellany, Hollywood and The Big Picture on disc two. Years in the Making was co-produced by Wainwright and Dick Connette, who produced High Wide & Handsome, Wainwright's 2009 tribute to legendary banjo player Charlie Poole.

== Track listing ==
Disc one
No.	Title	Writer(s)	Length
1.	"Rosin the Bow"	Traditional	0:38
2.	"You Ain't Going Nowhere"	Bob Dylan	2:26
3.	"East St. Louis Tweedle-Dee"	Steve Goodman	1:41
4.	"Everybody I Know"	Loudon Wainwright III	1:09
5.	"Philadelphia Lawyer"	Woody Guthrie	4:12
6.	"Roll in My Sweet Baby's Arms"	Traditional	4:15
7.	"Love Gifts"	Loudon Wainwright III	2:40
8.	"Stewball"	Traditional	3:43
9.	"Flood of Tears"	Loudon Wainwright III	2:25
10.	"Station Break"	Loudon Wainwright III	0:27
11.	"Have You Ever Been to Pittsburgh?"	Loudon Wainwright III	1:10
12.	"2 Song Set"	Loudon Wainwright III	3:54
13.	"Cardboard Boxes"	Loudon Wainwright III	3:13
14.	"Smokey Joe's Cafe"	Jerry Leiber/Mike Stoller	3:25
15.	"You Hurt Me Mantra"	Loudon Wainwright III	3:28
16.	"Rambunctious"	Loudon Wainwright III	2:34
17.	"Wanna Be on MTV"	Loudon Wainwright III	2:19
18.	"Birthday Poem/Happy Birthday/Animal Song"	Suzzy Roche/Public Domain/Loudon Wainwright III	1:33
19.	"Your Mother & I"	Loudon Wainwright III	3:33
20.	"Button Nose"	Loudon Wainwright III	2:41
21.	"The Ballad of Famous & Harper"	Loudon Wainwright III	2:39
22.	"Teenager's Lament"	Loudon Wainwright III	3:03
23.	"Things"	Loudon Wainwright III	4:21

Disc two
No.	Title	Writer(s)	Length
1.	"Unrequited to the Nth Degree"	Loudon Wainwright III	3:15
2.	"Ulcer"	Loudon Wainwright III	3:31
3.	"You Can't Fail Me Now"	Joe Henry/Loudon Wainwright III	2:57
4.	"No"	Loudon Wainwright III	3:30
5.	"Rowena"	Loudon Wainwright III	2:53
6.	"Cheatin'"	Loudon Wainwright III	2:13
7.	"IDTTYWLM"	Loudon Wainwright III	5:23
8.	"Down Where the Drunkards Roll"	Richard Thompson	4:31
9.	"POW"	Loudon Wainwright III	2:03
10.	"Meet the Wainwrights"	Loudon Wainwright III	4:19
11.	"Liza Minnelli Interview"		0:45
12.	"Hollywood Hopeful"	Loudon Wainwright III	2:43
13.	"Valley Morning"	Loudon Wainwright III	3:23
14.	"Trailer"	Loudon Wainwright III	3:30
15.	"God's Got a Sh*t List"	Loudon Wainwright III	2:30
16.	"Thank You, Mr. Hubble"	Loudon Wainwright III	2:15
17.	"It Ain't Gaza"	Loudon Wainwright III	3:06
18.	"Out of This World"	Loudon Wainwright III	6:05
19.	"Birthday Boy"	Loudon Wainwright III	1:32

== Charts ==
Chart performance for Years in the Making
Chart (2018)	Peak position
Scottish Albums (OCC)	60
UK Album Sales (OCC)	67
UK Independent Albums (OCC)	27
