= Sharon Webb =

American novelist

Sharon Lynn Webb (born in Tampa, Florida on February 29, 1936; died in Blairsville, Georgia on April 29, 2010) was a science fiction writer and nurse.

== Biography ==
Born in Tampa, Florida on February 29, 1936, Sharon Lynn Webb began her career as a published author when one of her poems was published in a 1963 edition of The Magazine of Fantasy & Science Fiction. Frequently writing under the pseudonym "Ron Webb" during the early part of her career, her work increased in frequency under her given name by 1979. Her works often concerned medical issues or advances in medicine. Along with science fiction she also wrote medically-oriented thrillers. Webb suffered a heart attack, and died in Blairsville, Georgia on April 29, 2010.

== Selected works ==
- Earth Song trilogy
  - Earthchild (1982)
  - Earth Song (1983)
  - Ram Song (1984)
- The Adventures of Terra Tarkington (1985) (fixup)
- R.N. (1985)
- The Thing That Goes Burp in the Night (1986) short story
- Pestis 18 (1987)
- The Half Life (1989)

== Sources ==
- The Encyclopedia of Science Fiction, pg 1307
