= That Only a Mother =

- Short story by Judith Merril
- Country: USA
- Language: English
- Genre: Science fiction

Publication
- Publication type: Astounding Science Fiction
- Media type: Print (Magazine)
- Publication date: 1948

"That Only a Mother" is a science fiction short story by American writer Judith Merril, originally published in June 1948 in Astounding Science Fiction.

== Plot summary ==
The story is set in 1953, which was then five years in the future. World War III has been going on for several years. Unlike in many other depictions, it is seen as a prolonged war, which does not destroy all civilization at once - but extensive use of nuclear bombs has led to a rash of mutated babies (it is implied that only a small fraction of pregnancies result in the birth of normal children).

The first part of the story is told in the form of letters from the pregnant Margaret to her husband Hank, a "technical lieutenant," who is on assignment for 18 months. In these letters, we learn of Margaret's fears of giving birth to a mutant, disturbing tales of infanticide by the fathers of deformed babies, her successful labor, and the rapid development of the newborn. The daughter, named Henrietta, is extremely precocious, speaking in complete sentences by the time she first meets her father at the age of ten months. Margaret dotes on her and thinks she is wonderful, though there are hints of something disturbing about the girl, including the story's title (referring to the phrase "a face that only a mother could love"), and an offhand comment that the nurses in the hospital were not sure whether the child was a boy or a girl.

When Hank returns home, he discovers that his daughter has no arms or legs, and that his wife is in such strong denial that she does not realize she has given birth to a mutant.

== Reception and legacy ==
"That Only a Mother" falls into a category of mid-century science fiction writing often referred to as the "housewife heroine" story, works that deal explicitly with domestic themes and the experiences of women. Stories of this type were often controversial because while some editors praised their literary qualities, others viewed them as dull domestic tales. Nevertheless, "That Only a Mother" went on to become one of the most anthologized science fiction stories of the twentieth century.

"That Only a Mother" was among the stories selected in 1970 by the Science Fiction Writers of America as one of the best science fiction short stories before the creation of the Nebula Awards. As such, it was published in The Science Fiction Hall of Fame Volume One, 1929-1964.

Jonathan Strahan has emphasized how uncommon it was at the time for science fiction to provide a woman's perspective, but nonetheless calls the story dated, saying that the passage of decades has changed it from "a chilling and timely piece of science fiction" to "an important but not particularly moving historical footnote."
