= Loophole (short story) =

- Short story by Arthur C. Clarke
- Country: United Kingdom
- Language: English
- Genre: Science fiction

Publication
- Published in: Astounding Science Fiction
- Publisher: Street & Smith
- Publication date: 1946

"Loophole" is a science fiction short story by British writer Arthur C. Clarke, first published in 1946 in the magazine Astounding Science Fiction. It was subsequently published as part of a short story collection in A Treasury of Science Fiction (Groff Conklin, 1948) and Expedition to Earth in 1953.

It details the concern of the advanced Martian civilization with humanity's research into rocketry following the discovery of atomic power. The title of the story refers to the solution humanity utilizes to overcome the threat of the Martians.

== Summary ==
The story begins in the form of correspondence between the President of Mars and the Secretary of the Martian Council of Scientists, regarding the discovery of atomic power (in the form of atomic bombs) by humans. They are concerned that once humanity's current war is over (they have been monitoring Earth's broadcasts), humans will use atomic power and rockets to breach interplanetary space and pose a threat to Mars. A remote monitoring station is set up by Mars on the Moon to monitor Earth's progress. Finally they send a fleet of 19 battleships along with a warning to Earth that one city will be destroyed every time a rocket leaves Earth's atmosphere. Earth agrees to stop experimenting with rockets when they realize their broadcasts are being intercepted. Ten years pass without any further rocket experimentation, while the Martians plan for the extermination of the human race, believing that Earth will always be a threat to them.

The next letter, beginning "Mars is a mess!", is sent from Mars by Lieutenant Commander Henry Forbes, and reports to Earth upon the destruction of Martian civilization due to a nuclear attack from Earth. The previous letters had been recovered from the ruins of the capital. Rather than experimenting with rockets, humans had perfected matter transmission and beamed their bombs directly over the Martian cities. Forbes is hopeful that rocket experiments will resume soon, as he finds being "beamed" across space to be uncomfortable.

== See also ==
- Quibble (plot device)
- The Day the Earth Stood Still (1951 film)
