= Judith Merril =

American-Canadian novelist

- Born: Judith Josephine Grossman; January 21, 1923; Boston, Massachusetts, U.S.
- Died: September 12, 1997 (aged 74); Toronto, Ontario, Canada
- Occupations: Editor; fiction writer
- Spouses: Dan Zissman (m. 1940; div. 1948); Frederik Pohl (m. 1948; div. 1952)
- Writing career
- Genre: Science fiction

Judith Josephine Grossman (January 21, 1923 – September 12, 1997), who took the pen-name Judith Merril around 1945, was an American and then Canadian science fiction writer, editor and political activist, and one of the first women to be widely influential in those roles.

Although Merril's first paid writing was in other genres, in her first few years of writing published science fiction she wrote her three novels (all but the first in collaboration with C. M. Kornbluth under the joint pseudonym Cyril Judd) and some stories. Her roughly four decades in that genre also included writing 26 published short stories, and editing a similar number of anthologies.

== Early years ==
Merril was born in Boston in 1923 to Ethel and Samuel (Shlomo) Grossman, who were Jewish. Her father died by suicide in 1929 soon after she began to attend school. In 1936, her mother found a job at the Bronx House community center and moved the family to the New York City borough of the Bronx. In her mid-teens, Merril pursued Zionism and Marxism.

According to Virginia Kidd's introduction to The Best of Judith Merril, Ethel Grossman had been a suffragette, was a founder of the women's Zionist organization Hadassah, and was "a liberated female frustrated at every turn by the world in which she found herself".

In 1939, Judith graduated from Morris High School in the Bronx at 16. She married Dan Zissman the next year, less than four months into a relationship that started when they met at a Trotskyist Fourth of July picnic in Central Park. Their daughter Merril Zissman was born in December 1942. In this period, she also became one of the few female members of the New York City-based group of science fiction writers, editors, artists and fans, the Futurians, which included Kornbluth. The Zissmans separated about 1945; in 1946 Frederik Pohl, another Futurian, began living with her. After her divorce from Zissman became final in 1948, she married Pohl on November 25; they divorced in 1952.

== American science fiction writing and editing ==
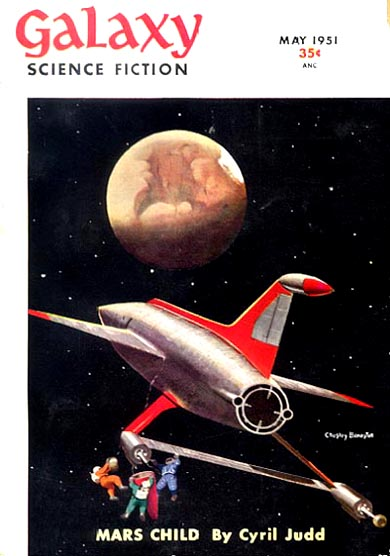
The opening installment of Mars Child, by Merril and Cyril Kornbluth, took the cover of the May 1951 issue of Galaxy Science Fiction.

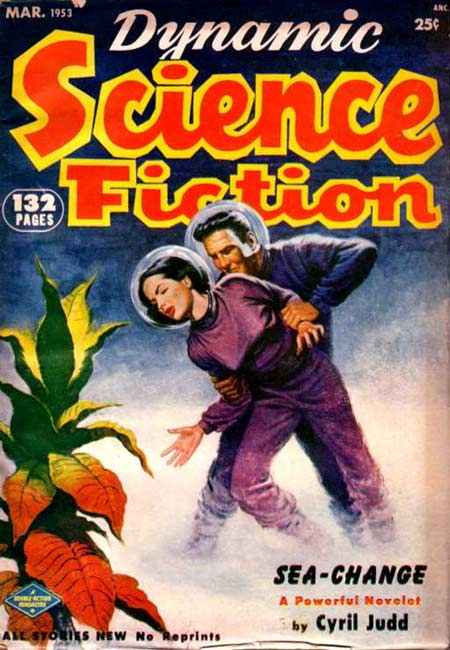
Another Merril–Kornbluth collaboration, the novelette "Sea-Change", was the cover story for the second issue of Dynamic Science Fiction in 1953. It has apparently never been reprinted.

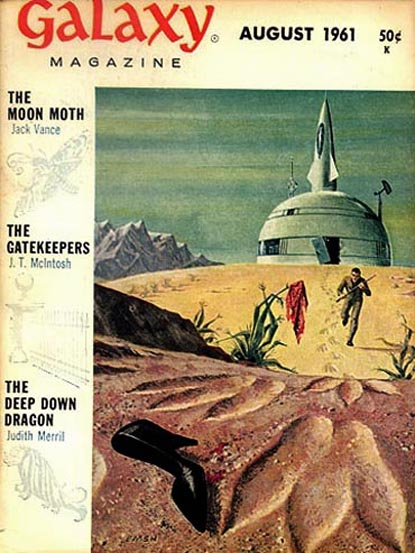
Merril's "The Deep Down Dragon" was the cover story for the August 1961 issue of Galaxy Science Fiction.

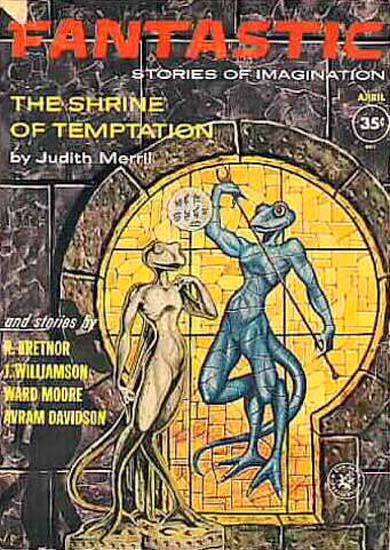
Merril's novelette "The Shrine of Temptation" took the cover of the April 1962 issue of Fantastic, featuring George Barr's first professional cover art.

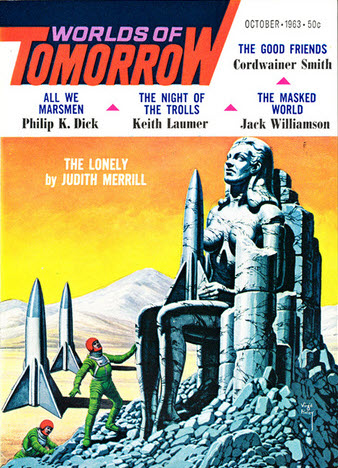
Merril's novelette "The Lonely" was the cover story on the October 1963 issue of Worlds of Tomorrow.

Using her daughter's given name as a surname, Merril edited a five-page SF fanzine dated May 1945, including a letter "On Ezra Pound" by Don [sic] Zissman. She edited, and published with Larry Shaw and Dan Zissman, a 20-page fanzine dated January 1946, Science*Fiction No. 1, including an editorial by her entitled "The Hills and the Heights". ISFDB notes, "A single issue fanzine from Judy Zissman (aka Judith Merril). It was clearly intended to continue, and many of the contents of the next issue are described, but a 2nd issue was never released—likely as a result of the collapse of her marriage to Don Zissman."

Judith Merril began writing professionally, especially short stories about sports, starting in 1945, before publishing her first science fiction story in 1948. Many of her contributions were to magazines edited by fellow ex-Futurians. She was a co-founder of the Hydra Club in this period.

Her story "Dead Center'" (F&SF, November 1954) is one of only two stories taken from any science fiction or fantasy magazine for the Best American Short Stories volumes edited by Martha Foley in the 1950s. Groff Conklin described her first novel, Shadow on the Hearth, as "a masterly example of sensitive and perceptive story-telling". Boucher and McComas praised it as "a sensitively human novel, terrifying in its small-scale reflection of grand-scale catastrophe". P. Schuyler Miller found it a "warm, human novel" comparable to Earth Abides.

Her second child, Ann Pohl, was born in 1950; she and Pohl separated in 1952 and their divorce was finalized the next year, during which she also lived with Walter M. Miller for six months. Her third marriage came in 1960, devolved into separation in 1963, but never reached a final divorce. Ann Pohl's daughter, Merril's granddaughter Emily Pohl-Weary, writes young adult fiction including science fiction and is a professor of creative writing at the University of British Columbia. She also co-authored Merril's biography after the latter's death, using access to her drafts, notes and letters.

Merril began editing science fiction short story anthologies in 1950 – including a "Year's Best" story-anthology series that ran from 1956 to 1967 – and published her last in 1985. In her editorial introductions, talks and other writings, she actively argued that science fiction should no longer be isolated but become part of the literary mainstream. Early in her editing career, Anthony Boucher described her as "a practically flawless anthologist". She had a role as Books Editor for The Magazine of Fantasy and Science Fiction (F&SF) from 1965 until 1969.

According to science fiction scholar Rob Latham, "throughout the 1950s, Merril, along with fellow SF authors James Blish and Damon Knight had taken the lead in promoting higher literary standards and a greater sense of professionalism within the field. They established the annual Milford Writers' Conference in Milford, Pennsylvania, where Merril then lived [as did Knight and his wife Kate Wilhelm]. Manuscripts were workshopped at these avid gatherings, thus encouraging more care in the planning of stories, and a sense of solidarity was promoted, eventually leading to the formation of the Science Fiction Writers Association." However, "disaffected authors began griping about a 'Milford Mafia' that was endangering SF's unique virtues by imposing literary standards essentially alien to the field."

One anthology project Merril began in the early 1960s under contract to Lion Books in Chicago was aborted, but inspired her publisher's editor Harlan Ellison to go forward with his own version of the project, which yielded Dangerous Visions (Doubleday, 1967). As an initiator of the New Wave movement, she edited the 1968 anthology England Swings SF, whose stories she collected while living in England for a year.

In 1966 Ellison wrote an episode entitled "The Pieces of Fate Affair" for The Man from UNCLE using the names of friends as characters. One of these was a THRUSH agent who was also a literary critic named "Judith Merle" played by Grayson Hall. Merril's daughter saw the episode and brought a lawsuit against the series for defamation of character. The audio track was later adjusted renaming Hall's character "Jody Moore" and the episode was kept out of syndication for many years.

== Canadian years ==
Merril was among those who in 1968 signed an anti-Vietnam War advertisement in Galaxy Science Fiction. In the late 1960s, Merril moved to Toronto, Ontario, Canada, citing what she called undemocratic suppression of anti-Vietnam War activities by the U.S. government. She was a founding resident of Rochdale College, an experiment in student-run education and cooperative living, very much part of the zeitgeist of the era. At Rochdale, she was the "Resource Person on Writing and Publishing" with her extensive personal collection of books and unpublished manuscripts.

In 1970 she began an endowment at the Toronto Public Library for the collection of all science fiction published in the English language. She donated all of the books and magazines in her possession to the library, which established the Spaced Out Library (which she named) with Merril in a non-administrative role as curator. The library has had its own physical space from the onset. During her last decade it was renamed the Merril Collection of Science Fiction, Speculation, and Fantasy. She received a small annual stipend as curator and, when short of money, she lived in her office at the library, sleeping on a cot.

From 1978 to 1981 Merril introduced Canadian broadcasts of Doctor Who. As the "Undoctor", Merril presented short (3-7 minute) philosophical commentaries on the show's themes.

Merril was an active organizer and promoter of science fiction in Canada. For example, she founded the Hydra North network of writers. In 1985 she launched and edited the first Tesseract, an occasional anthology of Canadian science fiction from Press Porcépic (Toronto).

In the early 1980s, Merril donated to the National Archives of Canada her voluminous collection of correspondence, unpublished manuscripts, and Japanese science fiction material – eventually the Judith Merril Fonds.

Merril became a Canadian citizen in 1976 and became active in its Writers' Union.

From the mid-1970s until her death, Merril spent much time in the Canadian peace movement, including traveling to Ottawa dressed as a witch in order to hex Parliament for allowing American cruise missile testing over Canada. She also remained active in the SF world as a commentator and mentor. Her lifetime of work was honoured by the International Authors Festival at the Harbourfront Centre, Toronto. She spent much time working on her memoirs.

The Science Fiction and Fantasy Writers of America (SFWA renamed) made Merril its Author Emeritus for 1997 and the Science Fiction and Fantasy Hall of Fame inducted her in 2013.

== Selected bibliography ==
=== Novels ===
- Shadow on the Hearth (Doubleday, 1950)
- Outpost Mars (Abelard Press, 1952). Written with C. M. Kornbluth under the joint pseudonym Cyril Judd. Earlier version serialized in Galaxy (May to July 1951) as Mars Child. Also published under the title Sin in Space (Beacon Books, 1961).
- Gunner Cade (Simon & Schuster, 1952). Also published under the joint pseudonym Cyril Judd. Earlier version serialized in Astounding (March to May 1952).
- The Tomorrow People (Pyramid, 1960)
- Spaced Out: Three Novels of Tomorrow, ed. Elisabeth Carey (NESFA, 2008). Omnibus edition of Shadow on the Hearth, Outpost Mars, and Gunner Cade.

=== Short story collections ===
- Out of Bounds: Seven Stories (Pyramid Books, 1960)
- Daughters of Earth: Three Short Novels (Gollancz, 1968). Collects: Project Nursemaid, Daughters of Earth, and Homecalling.
- Survival Ship and Other Stories (Kakabeka, 1973)
- The Best of Judith Merril (Warner Books, 1976)
- Daughters of Earth and Other Stories (McClelland & Stewart, 1985)
- Homecalling and Other Stories: The Complete Solo Short SF of Judith Merril, ed. Elisabeth Carey (NESFA, 2005). Includes essay "Judith Merrill's Legacy" by Emily Pohl-Weary.

=== Individual stories ===
- "That Only a Mother", Astounding (June 1948); anthologized in The Science Fiction Hall of Fame, Volume One (1970), Women of Wonder (1975), and Space Mail (1980)
- "Survival Ship", Worlds Beyond (January 1951); anthologized in Tomorrow, the Stars (1952)
- "The Deep Down Dragon" Galaxy Science Fiction (August 1961)
- "The Lonely" Worlds of Tomorrow (October 1963); anthologized in Space Mail (1980)

=== As editor ===
- Human? (Chicago: Lion Books, 1954), anthology
- SF: The Year's Greatest Science Fiction and Fantasy (1956)
- SF '57: The Year's Greatest Science Fiction and Fantasy (1957)
- SF '58: The Year's Greatest Science Fiction and Fantasy (1958)
- SF '59: The Year's Greatest Science Fiction and Fantasy (1959)
- The 5th Annual of the Year's Best S-F (1960)
- The 6th Annual of the Year's Best S-F (1961)
- The 7th Annual of the Year's Best S-F (1962)
- The 8th Annual of the Year's Best S-F (1963)
- The 9th Annual of the Year's Best S-F (1964)
- The 10th Annual of the Year's Best S-F (1965)
- The 11th Annual of the Year's Best S-F (1966)
- SF12 (1968)
- England Swings SF (Doubleday, 1968)
- Tesseracts, (Toronto: Press Porcépic, 1985) – volume 1 in the series Tesseracts: Canadian Science Fiction

=== Reviews ===
Merril wrote the "Books" column of the monthly The Magazine of Fantasy & Science Fiction, March 1965 to February 1969.
