= New Writings in SF =

British science fiction anthologies

New Writings in SF 1, edited by John Carnell, published by Dennis Dobson, 1964.

New Writings in SF was a series of thirty British science fiction original anthologies published from 1964 to 1977 under the successive editorships of John Carnell from 1964 to 1972 (the last volume with the aid of Diane Lloyd) and Kenneth Bulmer from 1973 to 1977. There were, in addition, four special volumes compiling material from the regular volumes. The series showcased the work of mostly British and Commonwealth science fiction authors, and "provided a forum for a generation of newer authors."

It is the earliest of four notable science fiction original anthology series of the 1960s and 1970s. The popularity of New Writings crossed the Atlantic, and several US original anthology series publications emerged, including Orbit, Nova, and Universe. However, overexpansion of the original anthologies field attributed by some to one particular editor, who was unable to fulfill a significant proportion of the volumes he signed contracts for with various U.S. publishers, resulted in the sub-genre ending up a fad, lacking overall the distribution and sales of the better-established series and magazines.

The series was issued quarterly for the first nine volumes but could not sustain this pace thereafter. Successive issues were released at somewhat irregular intervals, with as few as one and as many as five volumes appearing in a given year. Initial publication was usually in hardcover by Dennis Dobson to 1972, and by Sidgwick & Jackson from 1972 onward. Volumes were reissued in paperback after an interval by Corgi, though on more than one occasion the pattern was reversed, with the Corgi edition appearing first, Corgi Books being the main paperback imprint of London-based publisher Transworld.

The American publisher for volumes 1–9 was Bantam Books, which reissued volumes 1–6 in paperback, usually a few years after publication in England. The contents of Bantam's volumes 7–9 diverged from their British counterparts, consisting of repackaged selections from volumes 7–15 the original series. Bantam did not continue its series beyond its volume 9, and there was no American publication for the remaining volumes of the original series.

== Purpose ==
The stated aim of the series was to be "a new departure in the science fiction field," to consist of new stories written especially for the series by international authors, both established and new. "The editor will also be encouraging new methods and techniques of story-telling." Carnell had previously edited the magazines New Worlds and Science Fantasy. New Writings in SF can be seen as a continuation of his work on those magazines, his more conservative choices contrasting with the more radical direction that New Worlds in particular followed in subsequent years.

== Contents ==
Each volume featured a number of novelettes and short stories, mostly new works by British and Commonwealth science fiction authors, with occasional pieces by American authors, together with a foreword by the editor. The first twenty volumes included forewords by Carnell, the twenty-first by Diane Loyd, and the twenty-second through the thirtieth by Kenneth Bulmer. The Carnell-edited volumes averaged seven pieces per volume; the Bulmer-edited volumes averaged eleven.

Dozens of prolific authors contributed stories, some in series, such as James White's Sector General. Authors whose stories were featured more than once included Colin Kapp (12), Keith Roberts (11; two as by David Stringer, one as by John Kingston), Brian W. Aldiss (10), Douglas R. Mason (10; six as by John Rankine), John Rackham (9), Michael G. Coney (8), Joseph Green (8; one in collaboration with James Webbert), Vincent King (7), E. C. Tubb (7; one as by Charles Grey), John Baxter (6), Sydney J. Bounds (6), James White (6), R. W. Mackelworth (5), Donald Malcolm (5), Christopher Priest (5), Lee Harding (4), H. A. Hargreaves (4), M. John Harrison (4), Grahame Leman (4), Dan Morgan (4), Arthur Sellings (4), William Browning Spencer (4), Dennis Etchison (3), David S. Garnett (3), Ernest Hill (3), Charles Partington (3), Martin I. Ricketts (3), Ritchie Smith (3; two in collaboration with Thomas Penman), Michael Stall (3), Cherry Wilder (3), Eddy C. Bertin (2), Paul Corey (2), Robert P. Holdstock (2), Laurence James (2), John Kippax (2), David A. Kyle (2), G. L. Lack (2), Peter Linnett (2), Thomas Penman (2, in collaboration with Ritchie Smith), Robert Presslie (2), David Rome (2), Ian Watson (2), and Keith Wells (2).

Authors whose stories were featured once included Isaac Asimov, Barrington J. Bayley, Damien Broderick, Kenneth Bulmer, Ramsey Campbell, Graham Charnock, Arthur C. Clarke, David Coles, L. Davison, Bryn Fortey, Steve Hall, Harry Harrison, James Inglis, Marie Jakober, Wolfgang Jeschke, Vera Johnson, John Keith, Leroy Kettle, David Langford, Edward Mackin, Chris Morgan, Gerald W. Page, Frederik Pohl, Angela Rogers, Domingo Santos, James H. Schmitz, William Tenn, Bob Van Laerhoven, Manuel van Loggem, David H. Walters, W. T. Webb, James Webbert (in collaboration with Joseph Green), Robert Wells, Eric C. Williams, Jack Wodhams, and Donald A. Wollheim.

== The series ==
- New Writings in SF 1, John Carnell, ed. (1964)
- New Writings in SF 2, John Carnell, ed. (1964)
- New Writings in SF 3, John Carnell, ed. (1965)
- New Writings in SF 4, John Carnell, ed. (1965)
- New Writings in SF 5, John Carnell, ed. (1965)
- New Writings in SF 6, John Carnell, ed. (1965)
- New Writings in SF 7, John Carnell, ed. (1966)
- New Writings in SF 8, John Carnell, ed. (1966)
- New Writings in SF 9, John Carnell, ed. (1966)
- New Writings in SF 10, John Carnell, ed. (1967)
- New Writings in SF 11, John Carnell, ed. (1968)
- New Writings in SF 12, John Carnell, ed. (1968)
- New Writings in SF 13, John Carnell, ed. (1968)
- New Writings in SF 14, John Carnell, ed. (1969)
- New Writings in SF 15, John Carnell, ed. (1969)
- New Writings in SF 16, John Carnell, ed. (1969)
- New Writings in SF 17, John Carnell, ed. (1970)
- New Writings in SF 18, John Carnell, ed. (1971)
- New Writings in SF 19, John Carnell, ed. (1971)
- New Writings in SF 20, John Carnell, ed. (1972)
- New Writings in SF 21, John Carnell, ed. (1972)
- New Writings in SF 22, Kenneth Bulmer, ed. (1973)
- New Writings in SF 23, Kenneth Bulmer, ed. (1973)
- New Writings in SF 24, Kenneth Bulmer, ed. (1974)
- New Writings in SF 25, Kenneth Bulmer, ed. (1975)
- New Writings in SF 26, Kenneth Bulmer, ed. (1975)
- New Writings in SF 27, Kenneth Bulmer, ed. (1975)
- New Writings in SF 28, Kenneth Bulmer, ed. (1976)
- New Writings in SF 29, Kenneth Bulmer, ed. (1976)
- New Writings in SF 30, Kenneth Bulmer, ed. (1977)
- The Best from New Writings in SF, John Carnell, ed. (1971) (omnibus collecting selections from 1–4)
- New Writings in SF Special 1, John Carnell and Kenneth Bulmer, eds. (1975) (omnibus collecting 21–23)
- New Writings in SF Special 2, Kenneth Bulmer, ed. (1978) (omnibus collecting 26 and 29)
- New Writings in SF Special 3, Kenneth Bulmer, ed. (1978) (omnibus collecting 27–28)
