= New Writings in SF 9 =

1966 anthology edited by John Carnell

- Cover of the first edition
- Editor: John Carnell
- Language: English
- Series: New Writings in SF
- Genre: Science fiction
- Publisher: Dennis Dobson
- Publication date: 1966
- Publication place: United Kingdom
- Media type: Print (hardcover)
- Pages: 187
- Preceded by: New Writings in SF 8
- Followed by: New Writings in SF 10

New Writings in SF 9 is an anthology of science fiction short stories edited by John Carnell, the ninth volume in a series of thirty, of which he edited the first twenty-one. It was first published in hardcover by Dennis Dobson in the United Kingdom in 1966, followed by a paperback edition by Corgi the same year, and an American paperback edition with different contents by Bantam Books in May 1972.

The United Kingdom edition collects seven novelettes and short stories by various science fiction authors, with a foreword by Carnell. The American edition contains one piece from the UK edition of New Writings in SF 12, three from the UK edition of New Writings in SF 13, two from the UK edition of New Writings in SF 14, and two from the UK edition of New Writings in SF 15.

The third, fourth and seventh stories from the UK edition were later reprinted in the American edition of New Writings in SF 7.

== Contents (UK edition) ==
- "Foreword" (John Carnell)
- "Poseidon Project" (John Rackham)
- "Folly to Be Wise" (Douglas R. Mason)
- "Gifts of the Gods" (Arthur Sellings)
- "The Long Memory" (William Browning Spencer)
- "Guardian Angel" (Gerald W. Page)
- "Second Genesis" (Eric Frank Russell)
- "Defense Mechanism" (Vincent King)

== Contents (US edition) ==
- "Foreword" (John Carnell)
- "When I Have Passed Away" (Joseph Green) - from UK edition of New Writings in SF 15
- "Symbiote" (Michael G. Coney) - from UK edition of New Writings in SF 15
- "If You're So Smart" (Paul Corey) - from UK edition of New Writings in SF 14
- "Testament" (Vincent King) - from UK edition of New Writings in SF 13
- "The Macbeth Expiation" (M. John Harrison) - from UK edition of New Writings in SF 13
- "The Last Time Around" (Arthur Sellings) - from UK edition of New Writings in SF 12
- "Tilt Angle" (R. W. Mackelworth) - from UK edition of New Writings in SF 14
- "The City, Dying" (Eddy C. Bertin) - from UK edition of New Writings in SF 13
