= New Writings in SF 7 =

1966 sci-fi anthology edited by John Carnell

- First edition
- Editor: John Carnell
- Language: English
- Series: New Writings in SF
- Genre: Science fiction
- Publisher: Dennis Dobson
- Publication date: 1966
- Publication place: United Kingdom
- Media type: Print (hardcover)
- Pages: 190
- Preceded by: New Writings in SF 6
- Followed by: New Writings in SF 8

New Writings in SF 7 is an anthology of science fiction short stories edited by John Carnell, the seventh volume in a series of thirty, of which he edited the first twenty-one. It was first published in hardcover by Dennis Dobson in the United Kingdom in January 1966, followed by a paperback edition by Corgi the same year, and an American paperback edition with different contents by Bantam Books in August 1971. This was the first volume where the contents of the US edition differed from that of the original UK edition.

The United Kingdom edition of the book collects seven novelettes and short stories by various science fiction authors, with a foreword by Carnell. The American edition contains three pieces from the UK version, one from the UK edition of New Writings in SF 8, and three from the UK edition of New Writings in SF 9.

== Contents (UK edition) ==
- "Foreword" (John Carnell)
- "Invader" (James White)
- "The Man Who Missed the Ferry" (Douglas R. Mason)
- "The Night of the Seventh Finger" (Robert Presslie)
- "Six Cubed Plus One" (John Rankine)
- "Coco-Talk" (William F. Temple)
- "A Touch of Immortality" (R. W. Mackelworth)
- "Manscarer" (Keith Roberts)

== Contents (US edition) ==
- "Foreword" (John Carnell)
- "The Pen and the Dark" (Colin Kapp - from UK edition of New Writings in SF 8
- "Gifts of the Gods" (Arthur Sellings) - from UK edition of New Writings in SF 9
- "The Long Memory" (William Browning Spencer) - from UK edition of New Writings in SF 9
- "The Man Who Missed the Ferry" (Douglas R. Mason) - from UK edition
- "The Night of the Seventh Finger" (Robert Presslie) - from UK edition
- "Six Cubed Plus One" (John Rankine) - from UK edition
- "Defense Mechanism" (Vincent King) - from UK edition of New Writings in SF 9

== Reception ==
Terry Jeeves of Vector found the volume to fall short of expectations.
