= New Writings in SF 8 =

1966 anthology edited by John Carnell

- First edition
- Editor: John Carnell
- Language: English
- Series: New Writings in SF
- Genre: Science fiction
- Publisher: Dennis Dobson
- Publication date: 1966
- Publication place: United Kingdom
- Media type: Print (hardcover)
- Pages: 188
- Preceded by: New Writings in SF 7
- Followed by: New Writings in SF 9

New Writings in SF 8 is an anthology of science fiction short stories edited by John Carnell, the eighth volume in a series of thirty, of which he edited the first twenty-one. It was first published in hardcover by Dennis Dobson in the United Kingdom in 1966, followed by a paperback edition by Corgi the same year, and an American paperback edition with different contents by Bantam Books in December 1971.

The United Kingdom edition collects six novelettes and short stories by various science fiction authors, with a foreword by Carnell. The American edition contains four pieces from the UK edition of New Writings in SF 10, three from the UK edition of New Writings in SF 11, and two from the UK edition of New Writings in SF 12.

The first story from the UK edition was reprinted in the American edition of New Writings in SF 7.

== Contents (UK edition) ==
- "Foreword" (John Carnell)
- "The Pen and the Dark" (Colin Kapp)
- "Spacemen Live Forever" (Gerald W. Page)
- "The Final Solution" (R. W. Mackelworth)
- "Computer's Mate" (John Rackham)
- "Tryst" (John Baxter)
- "Synth" (Keith Roberts)

== Contents (US edition) ==
- "Foreword" (John Carnell)
- "The Imagination Trap" (Colin Kapp) - from UK edition of New Writings in SF 10
- "Apple" (John Baxter) - from UK edition of New Writings in SF 10
- "Robot's Dozen" (G. L. Lack) - from UK edition of New Writings in SF 10
- "Birth of a Butterfly" (Joseph Green) - from UK edition of New Writings in SF 10
- "They Shall Reap" (David Rome) - from UK edition of New Writings in SF 12
- "Shock Treatment" (Lee Harding) - from UK edition of New Writings in SF 11
- "Dead to the World" (H. A. Hargreaves) - from UK edition of New Writings in SF 11
- "Visions of Monad" (M. John Harrison) - from UK edition of New Writings in SF 12
- "The Wall to End the World" (Vincent King) - from UK edition of New Writings in SF 11
