= New Writings in SF 14 =

1969 anthology edited by John Carnell

- Cover of the first edition
- Editor: John Carnell
- Language: English
- Series: New Writings in SF
- Genre: Science fiction
- Publisher: Dennis Dobson
- Publication date: 1969
- Publication place: United Kingdom
- Media type: Print (hardcover)
- Pages: 188
- ISBN: 0-234-77276-X
- OCLC: 153557603
- Preceded by: New Writings in SF 13
- Followed by: New Writings in SF 15

New Writings in SF 14 is an anthology of science fiction short stories edited by John Carnell, the fourteenth volume in a series of thirty, of which he edited the first twenty-one. It was first published in hardcover by Dennis Dobson in 1969, followed by a paperback edition under the slightly variant title of New Writings in S.F.-14 by Corgi the same year.

The book collects seven novelettes and short stories by various science fiction authors, with a foreword by Carnell. The second and fifth stories were later reprinted in the American edition of New Writings in SF 9.

== Contents ==
- "Foreword" (John Carnell)
- "Blood Brother" (James White)
- "If You're So Smart" (Paul Corey)
- "The Ballad of Luna Lil" (Sydney J. Bounds)
- "The Eternity Game" (Vincent King)
- "Tilt Angle" (R. W. Mackelworth)
- "The Song of Infinity" (Domingo Santos)
- "Green Five Renegade" (M. John Harrison)
