= New Writings in SF 13 =

Book by John Carnell

- Cover of first edition
- Editor: John Carnell
- Language: English
- Series: New Writings in SF
- Genre: Science fiction
- Publisher: Dennis Dobson
- Publication date: 1968
- Publication place: United Kingdom
- Media type: Print (hardcover)
- Pages: 190
- ISBN: 0-234-77161-5
- OCLC: 227845020
- Preceded by: New Writings in SF 12
- Followed by: New Writings in SF 14

New Writings in SF 13 is an anthology of science fiction short stories edited by John Carnell, the thirteenth volume in a series of thirty, of which he edited the first twenty-one. It was first published in hardcover by Dennis Dobson in 1968, followed by a paperback edition under the slightly variant title of New Writings in SF 13 by Corgi the same year.

The book collects eight novelettes and short stories by various science fiction authors, with a foreword by Carnell. The fourth, fifth and eighth stories were later reprinted in the American edition of New Writings in SF 9.

== Contents ==
- "Foreword" (John Carnell)
- "The Divided House" (John Rackham)
- "Public Service" (Sydney J. Bounds)
- "The Ferryman on the River" (David A. Kyle)
- "Testament" (Vincent King)
- "The Macbeth Expiation" (M. John Harrison)
- "Representative" (David Rome)
- "The Beach" (John Baxter)
- "The City, Dying" (Eddy C. Bertin)
