= New Writings in SF 21 =

1972 British anthology edited by John Carnell

- First edition
- Editor: John Carnell
- Cover artist: Jerzy Osmolski
- Language: English
- Series: New Writings in SF
- Genre: Science fiction
- Publisher: Sidgwick & Jackson
- Publication date: 1972
- Publication place: United Kingdom
- Media type: Print (Hardcover)
- Pages: 189
- ISBN: 0-283-97875-9
- Preceded by: New Writings in SF 20
- Followed by: New Writings in SF 22

New Writings in SF 21 is an anthology of science fiction short stories edited by John Carnell, the last volume he oversaw in the New Writings in SF prior to his decease; later volumes in the series were issued under the editorship of Kenneth Bulmer. It was first published in hardcover by Sidgwick & Jackson in 1972, followed by a paperback edition issued by Corgi in 1973. The contents of this volume, together with those of volumes 22 and 23 of the series, were later included in the omnibus anthology New Writings in SF Special 1, issued by Sidgwick & Jackson in 1975.

The book collects several novelettes and short stories by various science fiction authors, with a foreword by Diane Loyd taking the place of the customary one by Carnell, in consequence of the latter's death.

== Contents ==
- "Foreword" (Diane Lloyd)
- "The Passing of the Dragons" (Keith Roberts)
- "Algora One Six" (Douglas R. Mason)
- "Commuter" (James White)
- "The Possessed" (Sydney J. Bounds)
- "What the Thunder Said" (Colin Kapp)
- "Tangled Web" (H. A. Hargreaves)
- "The Tertiary Justification" (Michael G. Coney)
