= New Writings in SF 20 =

1972 anthology edited by John Carnell

- Cover of the first paperback edition
- Editor: John Carnell
- Language: English
- Series: New Writings in SF
- Genre: Science fiction
- Publisher: Dennis Dobson
- Publication date: 1972
- Publication place: United Kingdom
- Media type: Print (Hardcover)
- Pages: 188
- Preceded by: New Writings in SF 19
- Followed by: New Writings in SF 21

New Writings in SF 20 is an anthology of science fiction short stories edited by John Carnell, the twentieth volume in a series of thirty, of which he edited the first twenty-one. It was first published in hardcover by Dennis Dobson in 1972, followed by a paperback edition issued by Corgi under the slightly variant title New Writings in SF -- 20 the same year.

The book collects six novelettes and short stories by various science fiction authors, with a foreword by Carnell.

== Contents ==
- "Foreword" (John Carnell)
- "Conversational Mode" (Grahame Leman)
- "Which Way Do I Go For Jericho?" (Colin Kapp)
- "Microcosm" (Robert P. Holdstock)
- "Cainn" (H. A. Hargreaves)
- "Canary" (Dan Morgan)
- "Oh, Valinda!" (Michael G. Coney)
