= New Writings in SF 17 =

1970 anthology edited by John Carnell

- Cover of first edition
- Editor: John Carnell
- Language: English
- Series: New Writings in SF
- Genre: Science fiction
- Publisher: Dennis Dobson
- Publication date: 1970
- Publication place: United Kingdom
- Media type: Print (Hardcover)
- Pages: 189
- ISBN: 0-234-77513-0
- Preceded by: New Writings in SF 16
- Followed by: New Writings in SF 18

New Writings in SF 17 is an anthology of science fiction short stories edited by John Carnell, the seventeenth volume in a series of thirty, of which he edited the first twenty-one. It was first published in hardcover by Dennis Dobson in 1970, followed by a paperback edition issued under the slightly variant title New Writings in SF -- 17 by Corgi the same year.

The book collects seven novelettes and short stories by various science-fiction authors, with a foreword by Carnell.

== Contents ==
- "Foreword" (John Carnell)
- "More Things in Heaven and Earth" (H. A. Hargreaves)
- "Aspect of Environment" (L. Davison)
- "Soul Survivors" (Lee Harding)
- "Death and the Sensperience Poet" (Joseph Green)
- "Two Rivers" (R. W. Mackelworth)
- "The Hero" (Ernest Hill)
- "The True Worth of Ruth Villiers" (Michael G. Coney)
