= New Writings in SF 2 =

1964 sci-fi anthology edited by John Carnell

- First edition
- Editor: John Carnell
- Language: English
- Series: New Writings in SF
- Genre: Science fiction short stories
- Publisher: Dennis Dobson
- Publication date: 1964
- Publication place: United Kingdom
- Media type: Print (hardcover)
- Pages: 191
- Preceded by: New Writings in SF 1
- Followed by: New Writings in SF 3

New Writings in SF 2 is an anthology of science fiction short stories edited by John Carnell, the second volume in a series of thirty, of which he edited the first twenty-one. It was first published in hardcover by Dennis Dobson in 1964, followed by a paperback edition under the slightly variant title New Writings in S.F.-2 by Corgi in 1965, and an American paperback edition by Bantam Books in October 1966. Selections from this volume, together with others from volumes 1 and 3-4 of the series, were later included in The Best from New Writings in SF, issued by Dobson in 1971 and Corgi in 1972.

== Summary ==
The book collects eight novelettes and short stories by various science fiction authors, with a foreword by Carnell. The book collects eight novelettes and short stories by various science fiction authors, with a foreword by Carnell.

== Contents ==
- "Foreword" (John Carnell)
- "Hell-Planet" (John Rackham)
- "The Night-Flame" (Colin Kapp)
- "The Creators" (Joseph Green)
- "Rogue Leonardo" (G. L. Lack)
- "Maiden Voyage" (John Rankine)
- "Odd Boy Out" (Dennis Etchison)
- "The Eternal Machines" (William Browning Spencer)
- "A Round Billiard Table" (Steve Hall)

== Reception ==
Contemporary reception was mixed: in New Worlds in January 1965, Michael Moorcock described the anthology as disappointing but considered Colin Kapp's "The Night-Flame" the strongest story in the collection. The anthology was also reviewed by Charles Winstone in Vector 29, 1964.
