= New Writings in SF 19 =

1971 anthology edited by John Carnell

- Cover of the first edition
- Editor: John Carnell
- Language: English
- Series: New Writings in SF
- Genre: Science fiction
- Publisher: Dennis Dobson, Corgi, Bantam Books, Sidgwick and Jackson
- Publication date: 1971
- Publication place: United Kingdom
- Media type: Print (Hardcover, paperback)
- Pages: 190
- ISBN: 0-234-77687-0
- Preceded by: New Writings in SF 18
- Followed by: New Writings in SF 20

New Writings in SF 19 is an anthology of science fiction short stories edited by John Carnell, the nineteenth volume in a series of thirty, of which he edited the first twenty-one. It was first published in hardcover by Dennis Dobson in 1971, followed by a paperback edition issued by Corgi the same year.

The book collects seven novelettes and short stories by various science fiction authors, with a foreword by Carnell.

== Contents ==
- "Foreword" (John Carnell)
- "The Mind Prison" (Michael G. Coney)
- "A Memory of Golden Sunshine" (Kenneth Bulmer)
- "Critical Path" (David Coles)
- "The Discontent Contingency" (Vincent King)
- "Stoop to Conquer" (John Rackham)
- "First Light on a Darkling Plain" (Joseph Green)
- "Real-Time World" (Christopher Priest)
