= New Writings in SF 12 =

Science fiction anthology

- Cover of the first edition
- Editor: John Carnell
- Language: English
- Series: New Writings in SF
- Genre: Science fiction
- Publisher: Dennis Dobson
- Publication date: 1968
- Publication place: United Kingdom
- Media type: Print (hardcover)
- Pages: 188
- Preceded by: New Writings in SF 11
- Followed by: New Writings in SF 13

New Writings in SF 12 is an anthology of science fiction short stories edited by John Carnell, the twelfth volume in a series of thirty, of which he edited the first twenty-one. It was first published in hardcover by Dennis Dobson in 1968, followed by a paperback edition by Corgi the same year.

The book collects six novelettes and short stories by various science fiction authors, with a foreword by Carnell. The second and fourth stories were later reprinted in the American edition of New Writings in SF 8. The fifth story was later reprinted in the American edition of New Writings in SF 9.

== Contents ==
- "Foreword" (John Carnell)
- "Vertigo" (James White)
- "Visions of Monad" (M. John Harrison)
- "Worm in the Bud" (John Rankine)
- "They Shall Reap" (David Rome)
- "The Last Time Around" (Arthur Sellings)
- "The Cloudbuilders" (Colin Kapp)
