= New Writings in SF 15 =

- Cover of first edition
- Editor: John Carnell
- Language: English
- Series: New Writings in SF
- Genre: Science fiction
- Publisher: Dennis Dobson
- Publication date: 1969
- Publication place: United Kingdom
- Media type: Print (hardcover)
- Pages: 188
- ISBN: 0-234-77277-8
- Preceded by: New Writings in SF 14
- Followed by: New Writings in SF 16

New Writings in SF 15 is an anthology of science fiction short stories edited by John Carnell, the fifteenth volume in a series of thirty, of which he edited the first twenty-one. It was first published in hardcover by Dennis Dobson in 1969, followed by a paperback edition issued under the slightly variant title New Writings in SF-15 by Corgi the same year.

The book collects six novelettes and short stories by various science fiction authors, with a foreword by Carnell. The third and fourth stories were later reprinted in the American edition of New Writings in SF 9.

== Contents ==
- "Foreword" (John Carnell)
- "Report from Linelos" (Vincent King)
- "The Interrogator" (Christopher Priest)
- "When I Have Passed Away" (Joseph Green)
- "Symbiote" (Michael G. Coney)
- "The Trial" (Arthur Sellings)
- "Therapy 2000" (Keith Roberts)
