= New Writings in SF 27 =

1975 anthology of science fiction stories

- First edition
- Editor: Kenneth Bulmer
- Language: English
- Series: New Writings in SF
- Genre: Science fiction
- Publisher: Sidgwick & Jackson
- Publication date: 1975
- Publication place: United Kingdom
- Media type: Print (hardcover)
- Pages: 207
- ISBN: 0-283-98221-7
- Preceded by: New Writings in SF 26
- Followed by: New Writings in SF 28

New Writings in SF 27 is an anthology of science fiction short stories edited by Kenneth Bulmer, the sixth volume of nine he oversaw in the New Writings in SF series in succession to the series' originator, John Carnell. It was first published in hardcover by Sidgwick & Jackson in 1975, followed by a paperback edition issued by Corgi in 1977. The contents of this volume, together with those of volume 28 of the series, were later included in the omnibus anthology New Writings in SF Special 3, issued by Sidgwick & Jackson in 1978.

The book collects twelve novelettes and short stories by various science fiction authors, with a foreword by Bulmer.

== Contents ==
- "Foreword" (Kenneth Bulmer)
- "Bartholomew & Son (and the Fish-Girl)" (Michael G. Coney)
- "The Day They Cut Off the Power" (Vera Johnson)
- "A Time of Mind" (Keith Wells)
- "Within the Black Circle" (Brian W. Aldiss)
- "Killing Off the Big Animals" (Brian W. Aldiss)
- "What Are You Doing? Why Are You Doing It?" (Brian W. Aldiss)
- "Long Time Ago, Not Forgotten" (Bob Van Laerhoven; translated by Les S. Cornwell)
- "Zone" (Peter Linnett)
- "Heatwave" (David Langford)
- "Heal Thyself" (John Rackham)
- "The Observer" (Graham Charnock)
- "Cassius and the Mind-Jaunt" (Colin Kapp)
