= New Writings in SF 11 =

1967 anthology edited by John Carnell

- Cover of the first edition
- Editor: John Carnell
- Language: English
- Series: New Writings in SF
- Genre: Science fiction
- Publisher: Corgi
- Publication date: 1967
- Publication place: United Kingdom
- Media type: Print (paperback)
- Pages: 190
- Preceded by: New Writings in SF 10
- Followed by: New Writings in SF 12

New Writings in SF 11 is an anthology of science fiction short stories edited by John Carnell, the eleventh volume in a series of thirty, of which he edited the first twenty-one. It was first published in paperback by Corgi in 1967, followed by a hardcover edition by Dennis Dobson in 1968. This marked a reversal of the usual publication sequence, in which the Corgi paperback followed an initial hardcover from Dobson.

The book collects nine novelettes and short stories by various science fiction authors, with a foreword by Carnell. The first, third and eighth stories were later reprinted in the American edition of New Writings in SF 8.

== Contents ==
- "Foreword" (John Carnell)
- "The Wall to End the World" (Vincent King)
- "Catharsis" (John Rackham)
- "Shock Treatment" (Lee Harding)
- "Bright Are the Stars That Shine, Dark Is the Sky" (Dennis Etchison)
- "There Was This Fella..." (Douglas R. Mason)
- "For What Purpose?" (W. T. Webb)
- "Flight of a Plastic Bee" (John Rankine)
- "Dead to the World" (H. A. Hargreaves)
- "The Helmet of Hades" (Jack Wodhams)
