= New Writings in SF 29 =

1978 anthology edited by Kenneth Bulmer

- First edition
- Editor: Kenneth Bulmer
- Language: English
- Series: New Writings in SF
- Genre: Science fiction
- Publisher: Sidgwick & Jackson
- Publication date: 1976
- Publication place: United Kingdom
- Media type: Print (hardcover)
- Pages: 187
- ISBN: 0-283-98325-6
- Preceded by: New Writings in SF 28
- Followed by: New Writings in SF 30

New Writings in SF 29 is an anthology of science fiction short stories edited by Kenneth Bulmer, the eighth volume of nine he oversaw in the New Writings in SF series in succession to the series' originator, John Carnell. It was first published in hardcover by Sidgwick & Jackson in November 1976, followed by a paperback edition issued by Corgi in 1978. The contents of this volume, together with those of volume 26 of the series, were later included in the omnibus anthology New Writings in SF Special 2, issued by Sidgwick & Jackson in 1978.

The book collects eight novelettes and short stories by various science fiction authors, with a foreword by Bulmer.

== Contents ==
- "Foreword" (Kenneth Bulmer)
- "Double Summer Time" (Cherry Wilder)
- "The Z Factor" (Ernest Hill)
- "A Space for Reflection" (Brian W. Aldiss)
- " Random Sample" (E. C. Tubb)
- "Sentenced to a Scheherazadean Death" (David H. Walters)
- "Between the Tides" (Donald Malcolm)
- "Young Tom" (Dan Morgan)
- "In the Coma Condition" (Charles Partington)
