= New Writings in SF 25 =

1975 anthology edited by Kenneth Bulmer

- Cover of first edition
- Editor: Kenneth Bulmer
- Language: English
- Series: New Writings in SF
- Genre: Science fiction
- Publisher: Sidgwick & Jackson
- Publication date: 1975
- Publication place: United Kingdom
- Media type: Print (hardcover)
- Pages: 189
- ISBN: 0-283-98177-6
- Preceded by: New Writings in SF 24
- Followed by: New Writings in SF 26

New Writings in SF 25 is an anthology of science fiction short stories edited by Kenneth Bulmer, the fourth volume of nine he oversaw in the New Writings in SF series in succession to the series' originator, John Carnell. It was first published in hardcover by Sidgwick & Jackson in April 1975, followed by a paperback edition issued by Corgi in 1976.

The book collects nine novelettes and short stories by various science fiction authors, with a foreword by Bulmer.

== Contents ==
- "Foreword" (Kenneth Bulmer)
- "Rice Brandy" (Michael Stall)
- "The Cat and the Coin" (Keith Wells)
- "The Debris of Recent Lives" (Charles Partington)
- "Talent Spotter" (Sydney J. Bounds)
- "The Black Hole of Negrav" (Colin Kapp)
- "A Little More Than Twelve Minutes" (Wolfgang Jeschke)
- "The Enemy Within" (Donald Malcolm)
- "The Halted Village" (John Rackham)
- "The Green Fuse" (Martin I. Ricketts)
