= New Writings in SF 22 =

1973 anthology edited by Kenneth Bulmer

- Cover of first edition
- Editor: Kenneth Bulmer
- Language: English
- Series: New Writings in SF
- Genre: Science fiction
- Publisher: Sidgwick & Jackson
- Publication date: 1973
- Publication place: United Kingdom
- Media type: Print (Hardcover)
- Pages: 189
- Preceded by: New Writings in SF 21
- Followed by: New Writings in SF 23

New Writings in SF 22 is an anthology of science fiction short stories edited by Kenneth Bulmer, the first volume of nine he oversaw in the New Writings in SF series in succession to the series' originator, John Carnell. It was first published in hardcover by Sidgwick & Jackson in 1973, followed by a paperback edition under the slightly variant title New Writings in SF - 22 issued by Corgi in 1974. The contents of this volume, together with those of volumes 21 and 23 of the series, were later included in the omnibus anthology New Writings in SF Special 1, issued by Sidgwick & Jackson in 1975.

The book collects several novelettes and short stories by various science fiction authors and an excerpt from the novel Rendezvous with Rama by Arthur C. Clarke, with a foreword by Bulmer.

== Contents ==
- "Foreword" (Kenneth Bulmer)
- "An Honest Day's Work" (Harry Harrison)
- "Evane" (E. C. Tubb)
- "Rendezvous with Rama" (excerpt) (Arthur C. Clarke)
- "Spacebird" (James White)
- "Three Enigmas: I" (Brian W. Aldiss)
  - "Three Enigmas: Introduction" (Brian W. Aldiss)
  - "The Enigma of Her Voyage" (Brian W. Aldiss)
  - "I Ching, Who You?" (Brian W. Aldiss)
  - "The Great Chain of Being What?" (Brian W. Aldiss)
- " Wise Child" (John Rackham)
- "The Rules of the Game" (Donald A. Wollheim)
- "Monitor" (Sydney J. Bounds)
- "The Time Wager" (John Kippax)
- "The Square Root of MC" (Laurence James)
- "The Inverted World" (Christopher Priest)
