= New Writings in SF 16 =

1970 anthology edited by John Carnell

- Cover of the first edition
- Editor: John Carnell
- Language: English
- Series: New Writings in SF
- Genre: Science fiction
- Publisher: Dennis Dobson
- Publication date: 1970
- Publication place: United Kingdom
- Media type: Print (Hardcover)
- Pages: 190
- ISBN: 0-234-77389-8
- Preceded by: New Writings in SF 15
- Followed by: New Writings in SF 17

New Writings in SF 16 is an anthology of science fiction short stories edited by John Carnell, the sixteenth volume in a series of thirty, of which he edited the first twenty-one. It was first published in hardcover by Dennis Dobson in 1970, followed by a paperback edition issued under the slightly variant title New Writings in SF -- 16 by Corgi the same year.

The book collects six novelettes and short stories by various science-fiction authors, with a foreword by Carnell.

== Contents ==
- "Foreword" (John Carnell)
- "Getaway from Getawehi" (Colin Kapp)
- "All Done by Mirrors" (Douglas R. Mason)
- "Throwback" (Sydney J. Bounds)
- "The Perihelion Man" (Christopher Priest)
- "R26/5/PSY and I" (Michael G. Coney)
- "Meatball" (James White)
