= New Writings in SF 10 =

1967 anthology edited by John Carnell

- Cover of the first edition
- Editor: John Carnell
- Language: English
- Series: New Writings in SF
- Genre: Science fiction
- Publisher: Dennis Dobson
- Publication date: 1967
- Publication place: United Kingdom
- Media type: Print (hardcover)
- Pages: 189
- Preceded by: New Writings in SF 9
- Followed by: New Writings in SF 11

New Writings in SF 10 is an anthology of science fiction short stories edited by John Carnell, the tenth volume in a series of thirty, of which he edited the first twenty-one. It was first published in hardcover by Dennis Dobson in 1967, followed by a paperback edition by Corgi the same year.

The book collects seven novelettes and short stories by various science fiction authors, with a foreword by Carnell. The first four stories were later reprinted in the American edition of New Writings in SF 8.

== Contents ==
- "Foreword" (John Carnell)
- "The Imagination Trap" (Colin Kapp)
- "Apple" (John Baxter)
- "Robot's Dozen" (G. L. Lack)
- "Birth of a Butterfly" (Joseph Green)
- "The Affluence of Edwin Lollard" (Thomas M. Disch)
- "A Taste for Dostoevsky" (Brian W. Aldiss)
- "Image of Destruction" (John Rankine)
