= New Writings in SF 5 =

1965 sci-fi anthology edited by John Carnell

- First edition
- Editor: John Carnell
- Language: English
- Series: New Writings in SF
- Genre: Science fiction
- Publisher: Dennis Dobson
- Publication date: 1965
- Publication place: United Kingdom
- Media type: Print (hardcover)
- Pages: 184
- Preceded by: New Writings in SF 4
- Followed by: New Writings in SF 6

New Writings in SF 5 is an anthology of science fiction short stories edited by John Carnell, the fifth volume in a series of thirty, of which he edited the first twenty-one. It was first published in hardcover by Dennis Dobson in 1965, followed by a paperback edition by Corgi in 1966, and an American paperback edition by Bantam Books in August 1970.

The book collects seven novelettes and short stories by various science fiction authors, with a foreword by Carnell.

== Contents ==
- "Foreword" (John Carnell)
- "Potential" (Donald Malcolm)
- "The Liberators" (Lee Harding)
- "Takeover Bid" (John Baxter)
- "Acclimatization" (David Stringer)
- "The Expanding Man" (R. W. Mackelworth)
- "Treasure Hunt" (Joseph Green)
- "Sunout" (Eric C. Williams)
