= New Writings in SF 4 =

1965 sci-fi anthology edited by John Carnell

- First edition
- Editor: John Carnell
- Language: English
- Series: New Writings in SF
- Genre: Science fiction
- Publisher: Dennis Dobson
- Publication date: 1965
- Publication place: United Kingdom
- Media type: Print (hardcover)
- Pages: 186
- Preceded by: New Writings in SF 3
- Followed by: New Writings in SF 5

New Writings in SF 4 is an anthology of science fiction short stories edited by John Carnell, the fourth volume in a series of thirty, of which he edited the first twenty-one. It was first published in hardcover by Dennis Dobson in 1965, followed by a paperback edition by Corgi the same year, and an American paperback edition by Bantam Books in March 1968. Selections from this volume, together with others from volumes 1-3 of the series, were later included in The Best from New Writings in SF, issued by Dobson in 1971 and Corgi in 1972.

The book collects seven novelettes and short stories by various science fiction authors, with a foreword by Carnell.

== Contents ==
- "Foreword" (John Carnell)
- "High Eight" (David Stringer)
- "Star Light" (Isaac Asimov)
- "Hunger Over Sweet Waters" (Colin Kapp)
- "The Country of the Strong" (Dennis Etchison)
- "Parking Problem" (Dan Morgan)
- "Sub-Lim" (Keith Roberts)
- "Bernie the Faust" (William Tenn)
