= New Writings in SF 18 =

1971 anthology edited by John Carnell

- Cover of the first edition
- Editor: John Carnell
- Language: English
- Series: New Writings in SF
- Genre: Science fiction
- Publisher: Dennis Dobson
- Publication date: 1971
- Publication place: United Kingdom
- Media type: Print (hardcover)
- Pages: 187
- ISBN: 0-234-77613-7
- Preceded by: New Writings in SF 17
- Followed by: New Writings in SF 19

New Writings in SF 18 is an anthology of science fiction short stories edited by John Carnell, the eighteenth volume in a series of thirty, of which he edited the first twenty-one. It was first published in hardcover by Dennis Dobson in June 1971, followed by a paperback edition issued by Corgi later the same year.

The book collects seven novelettes and short stories by various science fiction authors, with a foreword by Carnell.

The paperback edition re-used the artwork from volume 5.

== Contents ==
- "Foreword" (John Carnell)
- "Mistress of the Mind" (Lee Harding)
- "Frontier Incident" (Robert Wells)
- "The Big Day" (Donald Malcolm)
- "Major Operation" (James White)
- "The Cyclops Patrol" (William Browning Spencer)
- "Some Dreams Come in Packages" (David A. Kyle)
- "Django Maverick: 2051" (Grahame Leman)
