= New Writings in SF 24 =

1974 anthology edited by Kenneth Bulmer

- Cover of first edition
- Editor: Kenneth Bulmer
- Language: English
- Series: New Writings in SF
- Genre: Science fiction
- Publisher: Sidgwick & Jackson
- Publication date: 1974
- Publication place: United Kingdom
- Media type: Print (Hardcover)
- Pages: 189
- Preceded by: New Writings in SF 23
- Followed by: New Writings in SF 25

New Writings in SF 24 is an anthology of science fiction short stories edited by Kenneth Bulmer, the third volume of nine he oversaw in the New Writings in SF series in succession to the series' originator, John Carnell. It was first published in hardcover by Sidgwick & Jackson in April 1974, followed by a paperback edition under the slightly variant title New Writings in SF - 24 issued by Corgi in 1975.

The book collects several novelettes and short stories by various science fiction authors, with a foreword by Bulmer.

== Contents ==
- "Foreword" (Kenneth Bulmer)
- "The Ark of James Carlyle" (Cherry Wilder)
- "And When I Die . . ." (Peter Linnett)
- "Three Enigmas III: All in God's Mind" (Brian W. Aldiss)
  - "The Unbearableness of Other Lives" (Brian W. Aldiss)
  - "The Old Fleeing and Fleeting Images" (Brian W. Aldiss)
  - "Looking on the Sunny Side of an Eclipse" (Brian W. Aldiss)
- "A Strange and Terrible Sea" (Donald Malcolm)
- "New Canute" (Martin I. Ricketts)
- "No Certain Armour" (John Kippax)
- "Now Hear the Word" (David S. Garnett)
