= New Writings in SF 3 =

Anthology of science fiction short stories

- First edition
- Editor: John Carnell
- Language: English
- Series: New Writings in SF
- Genre: Science fiction
- Publisher: Dennis Dobson
- Publication date: 1965
- Publication place: United Kingdom
- Media type: Print (hardcover)
- Pages: 188
- Preceded by: New Writings in SF 2
- Followed by: New Writings in SF 4

New Writings in SF 3 is an anthology of science fiction short stories edited by John Carnell, the third volume in a series of thirty, of which he edited the first twenty-one. It was first published in hardcover by Dennis Dobson in 1965, followed by a paperback edition by Corgi the same year, and an American paperback edition by Bantam Books in February 1967. Selections from this volume, together with others from volumes 1–2 and 4 of the series, were later included in The Best from New Writings in SF, issued by Dobson in 1971 and Corgi in 1972.

The book collects eight novelettes and short stories by various science fiction authors, with a foreword by Carnell.

== Contents ==
- "Foreword" (John Carnell)
- "The Subways of Tazoo" (Colin Kapp)
- "The Fiend" (Frederik Pohl)
- "Manipulation" (John Kingston)
- "Testament" (John Baxter)
- "Night Watch" (James Inglis)
- "Boulter's Canaries" (Keith Roberts)
- "Emreth" (Dan Morgan)
- "Spacemaster" (James H. Schmitz)
