= Unorthodox Engineers =

First edition cover art by Richard Weaver

The Unorthodox Engineers were the subject of a series of science fiction short stories by Colin Kapp. They were a misfit bunch of engineers who solved problems of alien technology/weird planets in the future.

They were commanded by maverick engineer Fritz van Noon and included, amongst others, a convicted bank robber as quartermaster (on the grounds that he was likely to be the most capable person for the job).

The Unorthodox Engineers originally appeared in various British SF magazines and anthologies:

- "The Railways Up on Cannis" (New Worlds October, 1959)
- "The Subways of Tazoo" (New Writings in SF 3, 1964)
- "The Pen and the Dark" (New Writings in SF 8, 1966)
- "Getaway from Getawehi" (New Writings in SF 16, 1969)
- "The Black Hole of Negrav" (New Writings in SF 25, 1975).

Dobson Books published a collection of the stories as The Unorthodox Engineers ISBN 0-234-72072-7 in November 1979. A 2013 Kindle edition is available from Gateway, ISBN 0234720727.

The short story "The Pen and the Dark" was adapted into a text-based computer adventure game by Keith Campbell, with text by Colin Kapp. It was published in 1984 by Mosaic Publishing with the packaging for the game including a book copy of the original story.
