= New Writings in SF 23 =

1973 anthology edited by Kenneth Bulmer

- Cover of first edition
- Editor: Kenneth Bulmer
- Language: English
- Series: New Writings in SF
- Genre: Science fiction
- Publisher: Sidgwick & Jackson
- Publication date: 1973
- Publication place: United Kingdom
- Media type: Print (Hardcover)
- Pages: 191
- Preceded by: New Writings in SF 22
- Followed by: New Writings in SF 24

New Writings in SF 23 is an anthology of science fiction short stories edited by Kenneth Bulmer, the second volume of nine he oversaw in the New Writings in SF series in succession to the series' originator, John Carnell. It was first published in hardcover by Sidgwick & Jackson in November 1973, followed by a paperback edition under the slightly variant title New Writings in SF - 23 issued by Corgi in 1975. The contents of this volume, together with those of volumes 21 and 22 of the series, were later included in the omnibus anthology New Writings in SF Special 1, issued by Sidgwick & Jackson in 1975.

The book collects several novelettes and short stories by various science fiction authors, with a foreword by Bulmer.

== Contents ==
- "Foreword" (Kenneth Bulmer)
- "The Lake of Tuonela" (Keith Roberts)
- "Wagtail in the Morning" (Grahame Leman)
- " Made to Be Broken " (E. C. Tubb)
- "Three Enigmas: II" (Brian W. Aldiss)
  - "The Eternal Theme of Exile" (Brian W. Aldiss)
  - "All Those Enduring Old Charms" (Brian W. Aldiss)
  - "Nobody Spoke Or Waved Goodbye" (Brian W. Aldiss)
- "The Five Doors" (Michael Stall)
- "Sporting on Apteryx" (Charles Partington)
- "Rainbow" (David S. Garnett)
- "Accolade" (Charles Grey)
- "The Seed of Evil" (Barrington J. Bayley)
