= New Writings in SF 28 =

1976 anthology edited by Kenneth Bulmer

- Editor: Kenneth Bulmer
- Language: English
- Series: New Writings in SF
- Genre: Science fiction
- Publisher: Sidgwick & Jackson
- Publication date: 1976
- Publication place: United Kingdom
- Media type: Print (hardcover)
- Pages: 188
- ISBN: 0-283-98317-5
- Preceded by: New Writings in SF 27
- Followed by: New Writings in SF 29

New Writings in SF 28 is an anthology of science fiction short stories edited by Kenneth Bulmer, the seventh volume of nine he oversaw in the New Writings in SF series in succession to the series' originator, John Carnell. It was first published in hardcover by Sidgwick & Jackson in 1976, followed by a paperback edition issued by Corgi in 1977. The contents of this volume, together with those of volume 27 of the series, were later included in the omnibus anthology New Writings in SF Special 3, issued by Sidgwick & Jackson in 1978.

The book collects several novelettes and short stories by various science fiction authors, with a foreword by Bulmer.

== Contents ==
- "Foreword" (Kenneth Bulmer)
- "What Happened to William Coombes" (Angela Rogers)
- "The Way Erving Went" (Grahame Leman)
- "The Banks of the Nile" (Ritchie Smith and Thomas Penman)
- "The Bones of Bertrand Russell: A Triptych of Absurd Enigmatic Plays" (Brian W. Aldiss)
  - "Futurity Takes a Hand" (Brian W. Aldiss)
  - "Through a Galaxy Backwards" (Brian W. Aldiss)
  - " Where Walls Are Hung with Multi-Media Portraits" (Brian W. Aldiss)
- "On the Inside" (Robert P. Holdstock)
- "The Great Plan" (Leroy Kettle)
- "Face to Infinity" (E. C. Tubb)
- "The Call of the Wild" (Manuel van Loggem)
- "Wordsmith" (Bryn Fortey)
- "Manganon" (Michael Stall)
