= New Writings in SF 30 =

1977 anthology edited by Kenneth Bulmer

- Cover of the first paperback edition
- Editor: Kenneth Bulmer
- Language: English
- Series: New Writings in SF
- Genre: Science fiction
- Publisher: Corgi
- Publication date: 1977
- Publication place: United Kingdom
- Media type: Print (paperback)
- Pages: 206
- ISBN: 0-552-10835-9
- Preceded by: New Writings in SF 29

New Writings in SF 30 is an anthology of science fiction short stories edited by Kenneth Bulmer, the ninth volume of nine he oversaw in the New Writings in SF series in succession to the series' originator, John Carnell, and the final volume in the series. Most late volumes in the series were first published in hardcover by Sidgwick & Jackson, followed by a paperback edition issued by Corgi. No reference to a hardcover edition of this volume has been found; the Corgi paperback was issued in 1977.

The book collects eight novelettes and short stories by various science fiction authors, with a foreword by Bulmer.

== Contents ==
- "Foreword" (Kenneth Bulmer)
- "The Shack at Great Cross Halt" (Keith Roberts)
- "And the Moon Says Goodnight" (Martin I. Ricketts)
- "The Game with the Big Heavy Ball" (Brian W. Aldiss)
- "Read Me This Riddle" (E. C. Tubb)
- "My Sister Margarite" (Chris Morgan)
- "Notes from the Android Underground" (Marie Jakober)
- "The Roentgen Refugees" (Ian Watson)
- "Amsterdam" (Ritchie Smith)
