= New Writings in SF 26 =

1975 anthology edited by Kenneth Bulmer

- Cover of the first edition
- Editor: Kenneth Bulmer
- Language: English
- Series: New Writings in SF
- Genre: Science fiction
- Publisher: Sidgwick & Jackson
- Publication date: 1975
- Publication place: United Kingdom
- Media type: Print (hardcover)
- Pages: 190
- ISBN: 0-283-98288-8
- Preceded by: New Writings in SF 25
- Followed by: New Writings in SF 27

New Writings in SF 26 is an anthology of science fiction short stories edited by Kenneth Bulmer, the fifth volume of nine he oversaw in the New Writings in SF series in succession to the series' originator, John Carnell. It was first published in hardcover by Sidgwick & Jackson in August 1975, followed by a paperback edition issued by Corgi in 1976. The contents of this volume, together with those of volume 29 of the series, were later included in the omnibus anthology New Writings in SF Special 2, issued by Sidgwick & Jackson in 1978.

The book collects several novelettes and short stories by various science fiction authors, with a foreword by Bulmer.

== Contents ==
- "Foreword" (Kenneth Bulmer)
- "A Planet Called Cervantes" (John Keith)
- "Men of Good Value" (Christopher Priest)
- "Three Coins in Enigmatic Fountains: Three Enigmas: IV" (Brian W. Aldiss)
  - "Carefully Observed Women" (Brian W. Aldiss)
  - "The Daffodil Returns the Smile" (Brian W. Aldiss)
  - "The Year of the Quiet Computer" (Brian W. Aldiss)
- "The Phobos Transcripts" (Cherry Wilder)
- "The Man Who" (David S. Garnett)
- "You Get Lots of Yesterdays, Lots of Tomorrows, and Only One Today" (Laurence James)
- "Murders" (Ramsey Campbell)
- "To the Pump Room with Jane" (Ian Watson)
- "The Seafarer" (Ritchie Smith and Thomas Penman)
