= New Writings in SF 1 =

1964 anthology edited by John Carnell

- Cover of first edition, 1964
- Editor: John Carnell
- Language: English
- Series: New Writings in SF
- Genre: Science fiction
- Publisher: Dennis Dobson
- Publication date: 1964
- Publication place: United Kingdom
- Media type: Print (hardcover)
- Pages: 190
- Followed by: New Writings in SF 2

New Writings in SF 1 is an anthology of science fiction short stories edited by John Carnell, the initial volume in a series of thirty, of which he edited the first twenty-one. It was first published in hardcover by Dennis Dobson in 1964, followed by a paperback edition issued the same year by Corgi, and an American paperback edition under the slightly variant title New Writings in S-F 1 by Bantam Books in April 1966. Selections from this volume, together with others from volumes 2–4 of the series, were later included in The Best from New Writings in SF, issued by Dobson in 1971 and Corgi in 1972.

== Summary ==
The book collects five novelettes and short stories by various science-fiction authors, with a foreword by Carnell.

== Contents ==
- "Foreword" (John Carnell)
- "Key to Chaos" (Edward Mackin)
- "Two's Company" (John Rankine)
- "Man on Bridge" (Brian W. Aldiss)
- "Haggard Honeymoon" (Joseph Green and James Webbert)
- "The Sea's Furthest End" (Damien Broderick)

== Reception ==
The anthology was reviewed by James Colvin in New Worlds SF, September–October 1964, Charles Winstone in Vector 28, 1964, P. Schuyler Miller in Analog Science Fiction -> Science Fact, January 1967, and Judith Merril in The Magazine of Fantasy and Science Fiction, February 1967.
