= Edward Mackin =

British writer

Edward Mackin was a British writer of science fiction from Liverpool, England. He was best known for his series of stories about 21st-century cyberneticist Hek Belov, published in various magazines, including Science Fantasy and New Worlds between 1957 and 1966. One history of science fiction magazines mentions him as one of John Carnell's 'stalwarts'; his story 'Key to Chaos' was published in Carnell's anthology of original stories New Writings in SF 1. He is credited with one of the earliest, most prescient fictional descriptions of factory farming.

Mackin served in World War II in the Royal Air Force, primarily in No. 235 Squadron RAF of the Coastal Command. After the war he worked for some years as a press-tool setter, as well as doing stints as a postman, salesman, painter and editor.

He is often conflated with Ralph McInerny, who occasionally used 'Edward Mackin' as a pseudonym, but McInerny, born 1929, was too young to have served in the Coastal Command.
