= The Touch of Evil =

1963 novel written by John Rackham

- Cover of the first edition.
- Author: John Rackham
- Language: English
- Series: Chappie Jones
- Genre: Fantasy, horror
- Publisher: Brown, Watson
- Publication date: 1963
- Publication place: United Kingdom
- Media type: Print (paperback)
- Pages: 157

The Touch of Evil is a fix-up fantasy horror novel written by John Rackham. Its three episodic parts were originally written as short stories and published in the December 1960 and June and December 1961 issues of the British magazine Science Fantasy. The book was first published in paperback by Brown, Watson in 1963 as no. R658 of its Digit Books series.

== Plot ==
Narrated by protagonist Chapman Jones ("Chappie"), the stories involve his pulp-style adventures with colleagues Dr. Ken Wilson and others in combating menaces of supernatural horror.

== Contents ==
- 1. The Black Cat's Paw.

Madame Tara, the old fortune teller living upstairs from Chappie, has been murdered, and her death is investigated by a certain Inspector Ferguson. While being questioned by Ferguson, Chappie realizes his neighbor must have been involved in something truly occult; the corpse has in hand a scrap of paper inscribed with the Solomonic seal of Belial. He calls in his old Navy friend Dr. Ken Wilson, an authority on the supernatural and ancient Egypt. Wilson is assisted by his niece Yalna and Egyptian friend Hassim. The investigation leads the five into conflict with an evil adept.

- 2. Ankh.

A villainous cabal seeking a magical Egyptian artifact steal and trap the souls of Dr. Wilson and Yalna in order to use their bodies to further their quest. Chappie and Hassim pursue them through London's seedy night scene in the doctor's Rolls-Royce to thwart the plot and restore their friends.

- 3. Out Of The Id.

The country home of an old friend of Dr. Wilson is terrorized by an apelike monstrosity, which Wilson, Chappie and Yalna are called in to investigate. The villainous Beamish, dabbler in the dark arts, appears to be involved.
