= The Wizard of Anharitte =

Novel by Colin Kapp

- Cover of the 1973 Award Books edition
- Author: Colin Kapp
- Language: English
- Publication date: 1973

The Wizard of Anharitte is a 1973 novel written by Colin Kapp.

== Plot summary ==
The Wizard of Anharitte is a novel in which the isolated planet Roget maintains a single spaceport in its city Anharitte for trade with space merchants and local rulers. However, the Wizard of Anharitte, a noble reputed to have magical abilities, threatens the status quo by introducing ideas of democracy and civil liberty — sparking fears of a slave uprising. To protect their financial interests, the ruling powers and the Company attempt to undermine him through economic and political pressure, but when these fail, they resort to open warfare to crush his influence.

== Reception ==
David Dunham reviewed The Wizard of Anharitte for Different Worlds magazine and stated that "This is classic science fiction. The main plot is the conflict between the Company and the Wizard, but the cultural clash between Anharittic and off-world values is not neglected. Not everything is what it appears to be on the surface; in fact, it's not always clear just who are the good and the bad guys, as the story and the main character develops. An entertaining read."

== Reviews ==
- Review by Richard E. Geis (1973) in The Alien Critic, January 1973
- Review by Baird Searles (1974) in Locus, #154 January 25, 1974
- Review by Malcolm Edwards (1976) in Science Fiction Monthly, January 1976
- Review [Dutch] by Karel Monfils (1976) in Holland-SF 1976, #4
