= The Patterns of Chaos =

1972 novel by Colin Kapp

- First edition (publ. Gollancz)
- Author: Colin Kapp
- Language: English
- Publisher: Gollancz
- Publication date: 1972
- ISBN: 0-575-01389-3 (first edition)
- Dewey Decimal: 823.914
- LC Class: PZ4.K1737 Pat

The Patterns of Chaos is a 1972 science fiction novel by British writer Colin Kapp. It originally appeared in If magazine, serialized in three parts.

It combines grand space operatic themes of battle between space empires and intergalactic alien invasion with philosophical themes of predestination and destiny, and detailed character development of a tight set of central characters.

Earth's Stellar Commando has placed their secret agent Commander Bron on a planet where they hope he will be able to find out the coordinates of a rival space empire, the Destroyers. Bron is there to impersonate a famous scientist of interest to the Destroyers, and has been given implants through which a monitoring team can see what he sees, hear what he hears and talk to him, even when separated by interstellar distances. The plot hinges on a fictional science, the study of the entropic "patterns of Chaos", which allows predictions of events with an accuracy that was not before possible. Both Earth and the Destroyers—and specifically Bron himself—are discovered to be the target of an extraterrestrial interstellar murder campaign that was hatched 700 million years ago. He succeeds in joining together the Earth and Destroyer fleets and confronts the aliens, to discover that his destiny is inextricably entangled with theirs.
