= Vera Johnson =

Canadian singer

Vera Johnson (June 13, 1920 – November 9, 2007) was a Vancouver folk singer-songwriter and author. She was known for creating original songs on a variety of topics, some of them controversial, including religion, sex, divorce, censorship, liberation, politics, and family.

In an autobiographical essay, Johnson recounts how she learned to sing and play music in 1949, and how she viewed her writing, whether through music, short stories, or plays, as a means for political change. Her song "The Fountain" described the "hippie protests" of 1968 Vancouver.

== Discography ==
=== Live Albums ===
- Bald Eagle (1974)
  1. The Bald Eagle
  2. Homer Johnson
  3. Oh Canada
  4. You Can't Let Your Hair Hang Down
  5. A Song for Michael
  6. The Do-It-Yourself Divorce
  7. Pierre Trudeau
  8. The Word
  9. Jesus Was a Preacher
  10. Layabouts
  11. The Gentle Rain of England
  12. That Minx from Pinsk
- That's What I Believe (1978)
  1. The Oldest Swinger in Town
  2. The Fountain
  3. The Indian
  4. The Queerest Critter
  5. Coming Home
  6. The Sweetheart of Sordido V
  7. Women's Liberation Blues
  8. God's not Dead
  9. Thomas Arkinstall
  10. Mrs. Ballantyne
  11. Nagamma
  12. That's What I Believe

== Written works ==
=== Short Stories ===
| Title | Date | First published in | Notes |
|---|---|---|---|
| "Black Six on Red Seven" | January 15, 1951 | MacLean's | Honourable Mention, story contest |
| "The Huckelmeyer Story" | February 1, 1953 | MacLean's | Originally published as "A Man's Gotta Lie Once in a While" / Third prize, story contest |
| "The Long Night" | April 15, 1953 | MacLean's | |
| "The Way is Hard and Weary" | April 1953 | Canadian Forum | |
| "The Beat of Moth-Wings" | August 15, 1953 | MacLean's | Originally published as "The Silent Star of Stratford" |
| "Death in the Toy Parade" | December 1953 | MacLean's | |
| "Vigil on the Rock" | December 10, 1955 | MacLean's | Originally published as "He Married for Murder" |
| "The Legacy" | December 1958 | Toronto Star | |
| "The Pilgrimage" | February 1959 | Canadian Forum | |
| "Death Comes to the Fiesta" | July 1960 | Mike Shayne Mystery Magazine | |
| "The Day They Cut Off the Power" | 1975 | New Writings in SF, #27 | Science Fiction |
| "The Throwback" | 1988 | Fictons, #1 | Science Fiction |
| "The Flower Words of Xochiquetzal" | 1990 | Fictons, #3 | Science Fiction |
| "The Case of the Raptrans Mole" | 1993 | Fictons, #5 | Science Fiction |
| "A Surfeit of Suspects" | 1994 | Fictons, #6 | Science Fiction |

=== Essays ===
| Title | Date | First published in | Notes |
|---|---|---|---|
| "Wanderlust" | July 1934 | Nature Magazine | |
