= Gold the Man =

1971 novel by Joseph L. Green

First US edition (publ DAW Books) Cover art by Josh Kirby

Gold the Man is a science fiction novel by Joseph L. Green, published in 1971. It combines themes of genetic engineering, Cold War politics, and sexuality with an encounter between humans and a race of humanoid giants. It was also published under the title The Mind Behind the Eye.

== Plot ==
"Gold" is a man created using genetic engineering. The object was to produce a person of high intelligence with superhuman reflexes and muscular coordination. He leads an unfulfilled life, despite having become rich and famous, including a career as a concert pianist. He lacks real companionship, and is certain that he is sterile and cannot have children. He is widely regarded as a playboy who has wasted his potential.

Gold lives in America, in a world governed by the United Nations. Humanity has been under attack by an extraterrestrial race they know only as Exterminators, having never seen an individual. The conflict has resulted in one of the enemy ships crashing on the Moon. The sole survivor is a humanoid giant, who was brain-damaged due to lack of oxygen. Evidently the Exterminators are a race of giants. Compared to them, humans are about the size of a large insect.

The Russians also have a genetic superman, Pavel Petrovna. He has built a capsule inside the giant's head, with the ability to control its body's movements from a keyboard while observing the world through one of the eyes. Petrovna himself is deformed, with arms and legs too short for his body. Only Gold has the ability to operate the controls. The plan is for Gold and Petrovna to be installed in the capsule inside the giant, and await rescue. The giant will be taken back to his home world, allowing the humans to gain intelligence about their attackers.

When Petrovna is killed in an accident on the Moon, the project has to go ahead with his assistant and lover, Marina Syerov, who initially despises Gold.

Flashbacks in the narrative also tell of Gold's upbringing in a research facility, particularly his teenage years when he was found to be sterile despite his strong sexual appetites, and the emotional impact of that discovery.

As the story progresses, Gold comes to appreciate the culture of the giants, as well as discovering that he is not sterile after all, his genetic makeup simply making him slower to mature than humans. Having fathered a child with Marina, he now has a different set of priorities in his life.
