= One Across =

1956 fantasy short story by Arthur Sellings

One Across is a humorous fantasy short story by Arthur Sellings. It describes what happens to a crossword enthusiast who becomes too engrossed in the hobby. It was first published in Galaxy Science Fiction in May 1956.

== Plot ==
Norman Woods is a crossword enthusiast. Having progressed through clueless crosswords, skeleton crosswords and even more abstract examples, to the dismay of his neglected wife, he deciphers his latest puzzle by deducing that the arrangement of words must exist in four dimensions. He experiences a dizzy spell with patterns appearing in his vision, and suddenly finds himself in another world devoid of civilization. He is accosted by a woman with the words "Anagram of 'carthorse'?" to which he instinctively replies "Orchestra". The woman, who insists on being addressed as "Miss Hoff", discovered the world they are on by accident while developing mathematical theory. She is able to pass back and forth to Earth using her talent for visualization. She has been setting complex puzzles to "translate" men and women to populate the new world. She says she is the only one able to return to Earth. She introduces Norman to the other inhabitants of the world, including a woman from the American Civil War era, and a youth with mental disabilities. Each came to the world by attempting to visualize something complex. In the Civil War woman's case, it was a knitting pattern. Miss Hoff mentions in passing someone by the name of "Bathurst" as having arrived by unknown means. Time runs slowly in the new world so people from long ago are still alive there. She herself arrived in 1906 but still looks young.

Norman encounters Ambrose Gedge, a mathematician and one of Hoff's earlier captives. She found him disgusting, and he spends most of his time drunk. Gedge has come up with a way of escape back to Earth. He has constructed an intricate wooden model that, if examined closely by someone sufficiently intoxicated, will allow that person to return to Earth. Gedge was working on a secret project. When he went back himself, he discovered that he was wanted for defecting to the Communists and had to return. Norman tries his trick after drinking a lot of extremely disgusting home-made liquor, and returns to his home town, where he is arrested for drunkenness. Waking in jail, he is informed that his wife is on the way to get him. He resolves never to do another crossword.

== External references ==
- One Across title listing at the Internet Speculative Fiction Database
