= Hello Summer, Goodbye =

1975 novel by Michael Coney

- First edition
- Author: Michael Coney
- Language: English
- Genre: Science Fiction
- Publisher: Victor Gollancz Ltd
- Publication date: June 1975
- Publication place: UK (also USA, Canada)
- Media type: Print (hardcover & paperback)
- Pages: 192 pp (Pan paperback)
- ISBN: 0-330-25226-7

Hello Summer, Goodbye is a science fiction novel by British author Michael G. Coney, regarded as one of his best and most representative works.^{,} It offers an unusually sympathetic portrayal of an alien race on a very strange planet. A fear of cold which is embedded in the race consciousness plays a significant part in the story, together with the semi-sentient lorin and other creatures.

The protagonist is a precocious youth, Alika-Drove, whom Coney manages nonetheless to make engaging through Drove's struggles with the forces around him. In the story, Drove learns about his world, about what drives the adults of his species to make the choices they do, he falls in love, and he grows up.

== Plot ==
The story begins in Alika-Drove's home town of Alika. The narrative moves to Pallahaxi, a small coastal village where fishing and tourism are the main sources of income. At first it seems that, in spite of "the war with Asta" and other hints of disturbance, this is going to be their usual summer holiday by the seaside. Drove encounters Browneyes once more, for the first time since they met the previous summer, together with some other youngsters and local characters.

As a result of the planet's global geography and eccentric orbit, the sea undergoes a strange transformation in which it becomes a semi-solid. This phenomenon is called the 'grume'. Some creatures are specially adapted to take advantage of this.

Politics and a global climatic crisis drive the unexpected denouement. A long freeze is beginning, and Drove's family are among the few intended to survive underground. The narrator Drove is in the end driven by love for his girlfriend Browneyes, and grief for his friends who have perished in the killing cold, to abandon his refuge and find whatever waits for him outside. He believes that his near-human people can survive by hybernation, with the help of the Lorin.

== Characters ==
=== Drove's parents, Alika-Burt and Fayette ===
To humans, Drove is strangely isolated from his parents, and there seems to be little love lost either way.
In spite of this, a parent-child relationship clearly exists.

=== Pallahaxi-Browneyes ===
The tavern owners' daughter, thus a permanent resident of Pallahaxi, and Drove's first love: in the end he staggers out into the killing cold to try to find her, if she is still alive.

She survives the ice age together with Drove with help of lorin who put them into hypnotic hibernation.

=== Ribbon ===
A physically attractive young girl with a rather abrasive, perhaps arrogant, personality, yet with many good qualities, so that Drove, the hero, remembers her in the end with love and pity: "I was always in love with you, Ribbon, just a little".

=== Wolff ===
The son of a colleague of Drove's father; a parentally-approved 'suitable' companion whom Drove dislikes. He is portrayed as an arrogant know-it-all who has already bought into his parents' status and concomitantly their view of life, and of other people: yet in the end Drove feels pity for him, as Wolff seems doomed to die in the killing cold.

=== Squint ===
Ribbon's baby brother, whom Drove regards as a frequently annoying presence, and yet remembers him with pity "very long ago a small boy woke safe and happy".

=== Silverjack ===
Mutant, fisherman, smuggler & boatyard owner.

=== Aunt Zu ===
Does not actually appear as a character, but is important as the subject of a story within the story, which illustrates the potential impact of excessive exposure to cold, or of the fear of cold, on a person's sanity: Drove, her nephew, comes to believe that her fatal mistake was to refuse help from the kindly lorin.

=== The Lorin ===
A semi-sentient species covered in long white fur and which in Drove's experience are used only for dumb labour, usually in an agricultural setting. There are hints that not everyone has the same limited relationship with them which Drove at first believes to be the universal rule: in the end he embraces them as his hope of salvation.

== Themes ==
In this book Coney deals with the impact of a dramatically varying ecology upon an intelligent species, both physically and psychologically. It is also a book about coming of age, examining what that might mean both in terms humans would understand, and what it might mean in the resident dominant species (who think of themselves as 'human'). The physical impact on evolution is also given significant weight. The sun is clearly a source of enough radiation to promote mutations in all species, and the extreme climatic cycles have also evolved creatures which are specialised to endure extreme cold (such as the lox and the lorin, or the ice-devils), or which have evolved to take advantage of events like the grume, such as the grume-riders.

=== Style ===
In Hello Summer, Goodbye, Coney writes in the first person and almost exclusively through Drove's eyes.

== Publication history ==
The novel was originally published by Gollancz in June 1975 in the UK as Hello Summer, Goodbye. The first US publication followed in November 1975 under the variant title Rax; however this title was last used for a 1977 issue by Michel Albin. ("Rax" is the name of the cold, giant planet which perturbs the orbit of Drove's home world.) The book was also published in Canada in 1990 under the title of Pallahaxi Tide. DAW Books released a paperback version for publication in the United States with the title Rax. All other issues used the original title of Hello Summer, Goodbye.

== Sequel ==
A sequel, I Remember Pallahaxi, was published posthumously. It is set several hundred years after the events of Hello Summer, Goodbye. It confirms that Drove and Pallahaxi survived after 40 years hibernating, without ageing significantly. It also has Earth humans now present on the planet, and Drove's people have changed. More is revealed about the origins of his people and Lorin.
