= Menon Marath =

British writer (1906–2003)

Sankarankutti Menon Marath, better known as Menon Marath, (born in 1906 in Kerala – died 2 January 2003) was an Indo-Anglican novelist who settled in England and spent more than half of his life there. Menon graduated from Christian College in Madras (now Chennai) and travelled to England in 1934 to pursue post-graduate studies at King's College London. His first novel The Wound of Spring (Dennis Dobson, 1960) is set in pre-independence India, in Kerala, (then comprising Malabar, Cochin and Travancore), in a feudal, matrilineal society. The second novel, The Sale of an Island (1964) is a political allegory. The third and last published novel Janu is about an orphaned girl seeking the freedoms of recognition as an equal, in friendship, in love.

== Biography ==
Menon Marath was a scion of the warrior class from the northern part of Kerala. The middle name of Menon was a title traditionally accorded by the King of Cochin, to all Nayar warriors who excelled as scribes and accountants. He graduated from the Christian College in Madras, and acquiring at this age his deep sense of the history of his land of Malabar from a reading of K.P. Padmanabha Verum's History of Kerala (not epigraphical, but anecdotal, he says). He sailed to England in 1934 to be a postgraduate student at King's College London. Unable to complete his studies, with a marriage and children soon to follow, finding a job to sustain a family became his priority.

Menon Marath's writing is measured, and thoroughly old-fashioned. Descriptions are chiselled with the lucent care of a Victorian essayist. At its keenest, his narrative rescues life and detail from the chaos of its own echoes.

Menon Marath always maintained that he was a slow writer. At 88, when he was interviewed for this appraisal he was living in the riverside suburb of Teddington.

In the silence of old age, he was writing his fifth novel – the fourth was still trawling the literary agents' corridors in search of a publisher. It is easy to describe Menon Marath as an undiscovered Isac Singer, although he was unable to accept the comparison.

According to an appraisal of his work, Menon Marath was near the end of his career as a middle-ranking civil servant in the mid-1960s. Twenty years later, he was working part-time as a librarian at the Buddhist Society in Pimlico.

He has not had the critical recognition of his literary peers of Indians writing in English: like R.K.Narayan, Ruth Prawer Jhabhvala, Raja Rao( praised by Lawrence Durrell) Nirad Chaudhuri, Mulk Raj Anand; nor the benefit of a redemptive blurb from the likes of Graham Greene that elevated Narayan. An elite readership has occasionally sought Menon Marath out to quiz and relate to his vision: of impermanence, of mortality, of justice and of equality; awareness of the tyranny of class, wealth and education; the redemptive power of love and the intimacy of compassion. He hides this and his general air of agnosticism expertly by weaving them, like Isac Singer, into a flawless structure of his good story telling.

== Works ==
- The Wound of Spring (Dennis Dobson, 1960)
- The Sale of an Island (1964)
- Janu
