= Eric C. Williams =

British writer (1918–2010)

- Born: 22 July 1918; London, UK
- Died: 2010
- Occupation: Author
- Writing career
- Genre: Science fiction

Eric Cyril Williams (1918–2010) was a British science fiction author active in the 1960s and 1970s, and then again in the last decade of his life. Williams was active in science fiction fandom in the 1930s, contributing the fanzines such as The Satellite. He worked as a bookseller prior to becoming an author.

== Bibliography ==
=== Science fiction ===
==== Novels ====
- Flash (1972)
- Homo Telekins (1981)
- Largesse from Triangulum (1979)
- Monkman Comes Down (1968)
- Project: Renaissance (1973)
- The Call of Utopia (1971)
- The Drop In (1977)
- The Time Injection (1968)
- Time for Mercy (1979)
- To End All Telescopes (1969)

==== Short stories ====
- "Amenemhet's Gift" (2001)
- "Arboreal Interlude" (2003)
- "Brides for Mars" (2002)
- "Dark City in Glass City" (2000)
- "Mr. Hazel's Miracle Carpet" (Dec 1937, Amateur Science Stories)
- "My First Space-Ship" (March 1938, Amateur Science Stories)
- "Number 7 (1969)
- "Something" (1999)
- "Sunout" (1965)
- "The Desolator" (1965)
- "The Egyptian Message" (2000)
- "The Garden of Paris" (1965)
- "The Martians" (2002)
- "The Paper Killer" (2003)
- "The Real Thing (1966)
- "The Venus Vein" (Dec 1937, Amateur Science Stories)
- "The Visitor" (2003)

==== Anthology appearances ====
- New Writings in SF 5 (1965)
- Science Fantasy Vol. 24 No. 75 (1965)
- Weird Shadows from Beyond (1965)

== General references ==
- Eric C. Williams at the Internet Speculative Fiction Database
