= Domingo Santos =

Spanish science fiction author (1941–2018)

Domingo Santos (December 15, 1941 – November 2, 2018) was the pseudonym of Spaniard science fiction author Pedro Domingo Mutiñó. He is among the best-known science fiction authors in Spain. Together with Sebastián Martínez and Luis Vigil he founded the Spanish science fiction magazine Nueva Dimensión. A science fiction prize, awarded annually at the national science fiction convention HispaCon, is named in his honor.

He has also used the pseudonyms Peter Danger and Peter Dean.

== Works (incomplete) ==
- Gabriel, historia de un robot (Novela, 1963)
- Burbuja (Novela, 1965)
- Meteoritos (short stories, 1965)
- Futuro imperfecto (short stories, 1981)
- No lejos de la Tierra (short stories, 1986)
