= Paul Corey =

American author (1903–1992)

Paul Corey (July 8, 1903 – December 17, 1992) was an American author. He wrote a trilogy, short stories, do-it-yourself articles in magazines, construction books, a science fiction work, and works about cats, among others. He began writing professionally in 1925.

== Personal life and early career ==
Corey was born on July 8, 1903, in Shelby County, Iowa, and he had six older siblings. His childhood was spent on a 160-acre farm. After the death of their father when Corey was two years old, his older brothers and mother took over the farm's operations. Corey was educated in rural schools, and he graduated high school in Atlantic, Iowa, in 1921. He attended the University of Iowa as a journalism major, where he repaired phonographs and assisted in the Geology Department Library. He was also a writer for the Daily Iowan and helped support the United States presidential run of Robert M. La Follette in 1924. During Corey's time as an undergraduate, he was a farmhand and millman inside a redwood mill in California.

Corey's wife was poet Ruth Lechlitner, and they traveled together to France, England, and Spain from 1928 to 1929. Upon returning to the United States, they built a house near Cold Spring, New York, and had a daughter there. They started a garden and raised chickens for eggs as a business. The family moved to Sonoma, California, in 1947 and built a house. A June 1959 article in Popular Science detailed the way which Corey built a door that his two cats, dog, and people could open at his Sonoma home. The magazine published a cartoon showing how it was built.

Corey was a liberal who was concerned about animals and the environment. He was interested in preserving mountain lions in northern California. He also worked to help spay and neuter pets, published various works about cats, and he was against scientific testing on animals. To write against local and national politics, Corey often wrote petitions and letters to the editor of a publication in Sonoma.

== Professional career ==
Corey graduated in 1925, later working as a reporter for several months in Chicago. He moved to New York City to complete research for the Encyclopaedia Britannica and the National Encyclopedia. He wrote short stories in the 1930s, and most of them were published in literary magazines. He used information that he learned from studying farmers in Iowa and South Dakota in 1935 for his fiction writing. In 1937, Corey was a New York State Federal Writers' Project fieldworker in Albany until he decided to write his first novel. From 1939 to 1941, his Mantz trilogy was published by the Bobbs-Merrill Company. The family in the trilogy was based on his family. Four more of Corey's books were published in 1946. He also wrote short stories, do-it-yourself articles in magazines, construction books, a science fiction work, and works about cats. His last published work was a foreword in a 1990 publication of letters that were written by his sister-in-law.

== Reception ==
The Library Journal said of Corey's book, Do Cats Think?, "Corey furnishes stories about his own cats. Illustrations were not seen by the reviewer. Although not vital, this will probably be a popular book." Corey's 1947 novel Shad Haul was reviewed in 2011 by Michael Turton of The Highlands Current who said, "Shad Haul includes some interesting messages and not just about the details of fishing — about the environment, entrepreneurism and initiative among young people, sticking up for what is right and the importance of compassion, family and friends and more."

== Death ==
Corey's wife died in 1989. He died from a cerebral hemorrhage at 89 years old on December 17, 1992, and his body was cremated.
