= Robert Presslie =

- Born: January 11, 1920; Aberdeen, Scotland, UK
- Died: 5 September 2000 (aged 80); Dudley, West Midlands, England, UK
- Occupation: Author
- Writing career
- Genre: Science fiction

Robert Presslie (1920—2000) was a British pharmacy manager and science fiction author active in the late 1950s and early 1960s.

== Bibliography ==
=== Short stories ===
- "A Star Called Tommy" (1955)
- "Trespassers Will Be Prosecuted" (1955)
- "Cat up a Tree" (1956)
- "The Creep" (1956)
- "Lest We Forget" (1956)
- "Post Mortem" (1956)
- "Flesh and Blood" (1956)
- "Pilgrims All" (1956)
- "Chip on My Shoulder" (1957)
- "Comeback" (1957)
- "Copy Cat" (1957)
- "Interrupted View" (1957)
- "My Name Is Macnamara" (1957)
- "Plague" (1957)
- "Star Tober" (1957)
- "Trojan Horse" (1957)
- "Another Word for Man" (1958)
- "The Champ" (1958)
- "Dial 'O' for Operator" (1958)
- "The 40th of December" (1958)
- "Ladies' Man" (1958)
- "Next of Kin" (1958)
- "One for the Road" (1958)
- "Pariah" (1958)
- "Sendoff" (1958)
- "Take Your Partners" (1958)
- "Verdict" (1958)
- "Old MacDonald" (1958)
- "Confession Is Good" (1959)
- "The Savage One" (1959)
- "Suicide Squad" (1959)
- "Lucky Dog" (1962)
- "One Foot in the Door" (1962)
- "Remould" (1962)
- "Dipso Facto" (1963)
- "Ecdysiac" (1963)
- "No Brother of Mine" (1963)
- "Till Life Do Us Part" (1963)
- "The Day Before Never" (1965)
- "The Night of the Seventh Finger" (1966)

=== Nonfiction ===
- "Speaking for Myself" (1963)
