= John Kippax =

John Charles Hynam
- John Kippax (left) with his literary and musical collaborator Dan Morgan, c.1957
- Born: June 10, 1915; Alwalton, Huntingdonshire, England
- Died: July 17, 1974 (aged 59)
- Occupation: Author
- Writing career
- Pen name: John Kippax
- Genre: Science fiction

John Kippax (1915-1974) was the pen name of English science fiction writer John Charles Hynam, author of many short stories and the Venturer Twelve series of space opera novels (most in collaboration with Dan Morgan).

Hynam was killed on the afternoon of 17 July 1974 when a lorry hit his car at Werrington, a few miles outside Peterborough. He left a wife, Phyl, and a daughter, Jennifer - who a week later gave birth to his first grandchild, a son, an event which he was awaiting with eager anticipation.

In the postscript to "Where No Stars Guide", published posthumously in 1975, Hynam's literary collaborator and close personal friend Dan Morgan wrote: "John had a larger-than-life physical and psychic presence. Likeable, eccentric, egocentric, kind, brusque, take your pick from the thesaurus to describe him, he was all of these and more. A man of enormous enthusiasms, he died as lived, at full speed".

== Bibliography ==
=== Venturer Twelve series ===
Hynam's death put a premature end to the Venturer Twelve series, of which he and Morgan collaborated on the first three volumes while Hynam wrote the fourth by himself. Morgan did declare his intention to write a fifth volume, but he never did. The series was thus left at a permanent cliffhanger - ending with an ever-increasing threat posed to space-faring humanity by mysterious, malevolent aliens whose precise character is never clarified, and with the struggle gathering momentum just when the series was cut off. Many further adventures were clearly intended for the Venturer's Captain, the tough macho Tom Bruce; his courageous, dedicated and sensitive Second in Command and former lover Helen Lindstrom; and their multi-racial crew. These seem doomed to remain unwritten. As noted by Morgan, the character of Admiral Junius Farragut Carter, Captain Bruce's boss, was "Hynam's own wryly conceived self-caricature".

- A Thunder of Stars (with Dan Morgan) (1968)
- Seed of Stars (with Dan Morgan) (1972)
- The Neutral Stars (with Dan Morgan) (1973)
- Where No Stars Guide (1975)

=== Short stories ===
- "Dimple" (1954)
- "Trojan Hearse" (with Dan Morgan) (1954)
- "Down to Earth" (1955)
- "Hounded Down" (1955)
- "Mossendew's Martian" (1955)
- "Mother of Invention" (1955)
- "Special Delivery" (1955)
- "Again" (1956)
- "Cut and Come Again" (1956)
- "Fair Weather Friend" (1956)
- "Waif Astray" (1956)
- "We Are One" (1956)
- "We're Only Human" (1956)
- "After Eddie" (1957)
- "By the Forelock" (1957)
- "Finegan Begin Again" (1957)
- "Salute Your Superiors!" (1957)
- "Send Him Victorious" (1957)
- "Solid Beat" (1957)
- "Point of Contact" (1957)
- "The Underlings" (1957)
- "Destiny Incorporated" (1958)
- "The Dusty Death" (1958)
- "End Planet" (1958)
- "It" (1958)
- "Me, Myself and I" (1958)
- "Thy Rod and Thy Staff" (1958)
- "Tower for One" (1958)
- "Call of the Wild" (1959)
- "Friday" (1959)
- "The Lady Was Jazz" (1959)
- "Last Barrier" (1960)
- "Blood Offering" (1961)
- "Nelson Expects" (1961)
- "Reflection of the Truth" (1961)
- "Stark Refuge" (1961)
- "Look on His Face" (1966)
- "The Time Wager" (1973)
- "No Certain Armour" (1974)
