= David Rome =

English cricketer

Personal information
- Full name: David Audley Moberley Rome
- Born: 14 April 1910; Marylebone, London, England
- Died: 20 May 1970 (aged 60); Kennington, London, England
- Batting: Right-handed
- Bowling: Right-arm medium

Domestic team information
- Years: Team
- 1930–1933: Middlesex

Career statistics
Competition	First-class
Matches	4
Runs scored	56
Batting average	9.33
100s/50s	–/–
Top score	32
Balls bowled	24
Wickets	–
Bowling average	–
5 wickets in innings	–
10 wickets in match	–
Best bowling	–
Catches/stumpings	1/–
- Source: Cricinfo, 29 December 2013

David Audley Moberley Rome (14 April 1910 – 20 May 1970) was an English cricketer active in the early 1930s, making four appearances in first-class cricket. Born at Marylebone, London, Rome was a right-handed batsman and right-arm medium pace bowler, who played for Middlesex.

== Career and life ==
The son of Brigadier General Claude Stuart Rome, Rome was educated at Harrow School where he captained the school cricket team in 1929. He later attended the University of Cambridge, where he did not play first-class cricket for the university. He would make his debut in first-class cricket for Middlesex against Cambridge University at Fenner's in 1930. His next two first-class appearances for Middlesex in 1931 and 1933 were both against Cambridge University, while his fourth first-class appearance came in the 1933 County Championship against Glamorgan. He scored a total of 56 runs in his four appearances, averaging 9.33, with a high score of 32.

He was for many years a member of the Surrey County Cricket Club Committee. He died following a fall at The Oval on 20 May 1970.
