= Joseph L. Green =

American novelist (1931–2026)

Joseph Lee Green
- Born: January 14, 1931; Compass Lake, Jackson County, Florida, U.S.
- Died: February 20, 2026 (aged 95)
- Occupations: Writer (including novels, short stories)
- Writing career
- Pen name: Joseph Green, Joseph L. Green
- Genre: Science fiction
- Website: greenhousescribes.com

Joseph Lee Green (January 14, 1931 – February 20, 2026) was an American science-fiction writer and a charter member of the Science Fiction Writers of America.

Green was a prolific short-story writer, known for his novel Gold the Man. His work has been translated into the German, Italian, Spanish, French, Polish and Dutch languages.

== Life and career ==
Joseph Lee Green was born on January 14, 1931. He received a Bachelor of Arts degree from the University of Alabama and variously worked as a mill hand, construction worker and a supervisor for Boeing.

His chief employment was in the American space program for which he worked for thirty-seven years, retiring from NASA as Deputy Chief of the Education Office at Kennedy Space Center. His specialty was the preparation of NASA fact sheets, brochures and other such publications for the general public, in which complex scientific and engineering concepts were explained in layman's language.

Green died on February 20, 2026, at the age of 95.

== Bibliography ==
=== Fiction ===
==== Novels ====
- The Loafers of Refuge (1965)
- Gold the Man (also known as The Mind Behind the Eye) (1971)
- Conscience Interplanetary (1972)
- The Horde (1976)
- Star Probe (1976)
- A Murder in the RealWorld (2018)
- A Lasting Dream of Murder (2018)
- Three Sons of Bitter Sands (2019)

==== Short fiction collections ====
- An Affair with Genius, London: Victor Gollancz Ltd. (1969)
- Running Wild: Unfettered Stories of Imagination (2016)
- Fantastic Tales of Love and Loss: Unfettered Stories of Imagination (2019)

==== Short fiction ====
- "The Engineer", New Worlds SF, February 1962.
- "Once Around Arcturus", Worlds of If, September 1962.
- "Initiation Rites", New Worlds SF, April 1962.
- "The Colonist", New Worlds SF, August 1962.
- "Life-Force", New Worlds SF, November 1962.
- "Transmitter Problem", New Worlds SF, December 1962.
- "The Fourth Generation", Science Fiction Adventures, Vol. 5, No. 30, 1962.
- "The-Old-Man-in-the-Mountain", New Worlds SF, June 1963.
- "The Fight on Hurricane Island", Argosy (British edition), June 1963
- "Refuge", New Worlds SF, July 1963.
- "Single Combat", New Worlds SF, July–August 1964.
- "Haggard Honeymoon" (with James Webbert), New Writings in SF 1, Dobson Books, London, 1964.
- "The Creators", New Writings in SF 2, Dobson Books, London, 1964.
- "The Decision Makers", Galaxy, April 1965.
- "Whaler's Wife", Inklings, Spring, 1965 (Chipola Jr. College, Marianna, Fla.)
- "Tunnel of Love", New Worlds SF, Vol. 48, No. 146.
- "Dance of the Cats", New Worlds SF, Vol. 49, No. 157.
- "Treasure Hunt", New Writings in SF 5, London: Dobson Books, 1965.
- "Birth of a Butterfly", New Writings in SF 10, London: Dobson Books, 1967.
- "Death of a Young Musician", Mike Shayne Mystery Magazine, August 1967.
- "Jinn", Galaxy, December 1968.
- "When I Have Passed Away", New Writings in SF 15, London: Dobson Books, 1969.
- "An Affair with Genius", Fantasy & Science Fiction, March 1969.
- "The Shamblers of Misery", Fantasy & Science Fiction, August 1969.
- "Death and the Sensperience Poet", New Writings in SF 17, London: Dobson Books, 1970
- "Wrong Attitude", Analog, February 1971.
- "The Crier of Crystal", Analog, October 1971.
- "The Butterflies of Beauty", Fantasy & Science Fiction, June 1971.
- "First Light on a Darkling Plain", New Writings in SF 19, London: Dobson Books, 1971
- "One Man Game", Analog, February 1972.
- "The Seventh Floor", Eternity Magazine No. 1, July 1972.
- "Three-Tour Man", Analog, August, 1972.
- "The Dwarfs of Zwergwelt", Worlds of If, June 1972.
- "Robustus Revisited", Fantasy & Science Fiction, April 1972.
- "A Custom of the Children of Life", Fantasy & Science Fiction, December 1972.
- "Let My People Go", The Other Side of Tomorrow, New York: Random House, 1973.
- "The Birdlover", Showcase, Harper & Row, New York, 1973.
- "Space To Move", The New Mind, Macmillan, New York, 1973
- "The Waiting World", Future Kin, New York: Doubleday & Co., 1974.
- "A Star is Born", Fantasy and Science Fiction, February 1974.
- "Jaybird's Song", Fantasy & Science Fiction, December 1974.
- "Walk Barefoot on the Glass", Analog, March 1974.
- "A Death in Coventry", Dystopian Visions, Englewood Cliffs, NJ: Prentice-Hall, 1975.
- "Encounter with a Carnivore", Epoch, New York: Berkley Publishing, 1975
- "Last of the Chauvinists", Fantasy and Science Fiction, November 1975.
- "Weekend in Hartford", Dude, September 1975.
- "Jeremiah, Born Dying", Odyssey Vol. 1 No. 1, Spring, 1976.
- "To See the Stars that Blind" (with Patrice Milton), Fantasy & Science Fiction, March, 1977.
- "An Alien Conception", Nugget, June 1977.
- "The Wind Among the Mindymuns" (with Patrice Milton), Fantasy & Science Fiction, December 1978.
- "The Speckled Gantry" (with Patrice Milton), Destinies, Ace Books, 1979.
- "Gentle Into That Good Night", Analog, July 1981.
- "Still Fall The Gentle Rains", Rigel, Fall 1981.
- "EasyEd" (with Patrice Milton), Fantasy & Science Fiction, May 1982.
- "And Be Lost Like Me", Analog, June 1983.
- "At The Court of the Chrysoprase King", Rigel, Spring 1983.
- "Raccoon Reaction", Analog, September 1983.
- "The Ruby Wand of Asrazel", World of Ithkar series, Berkeley Books, 1985.
- "With Conscience of the New" (with Patrice Milton), Analog, February 1989.

+ "Plague Ship", Aberrant Dreams, Autumn 2006. + "Turtle Love", Welcome To The Greenhouse, original anthology, February 2011.

- "Talus Slope", Perihelion Science Fiction, February 2013.
- "Curfew Tolls the Parting Day" (with Shelby Vick), Perihelion Science Fiction, May 2013.
- "Mortality, Eternity". Perihelion Science Fiction, January 2014.
- "Their Trailing Skies For Vestment" (with Shelby Vick), Perihelion Science Fiction, April 2014.

+ "A Killing In Kind", "FictionVale", third issue, about June 2014.

- "Stolen Dreams" (with R-M Lillian), Perihelion Science Fiction, May 2015.
- "Play Sweetly, In Harmony", The Last Dangerous Visions (not yet published).

=== Articles ===
- "Countdown for Surveyor", Analog, March 1967.
- "The Bugs that Live at -423°", Analog, January 1968.
- "Manufacturing in Space", Analog, December 1970.
- "Skylab", Analog, March & April 1972.

+ "Kennedy Space Center Will Give You A Lift", Odyssey January/February 1979.

- "The E-Zines: Destiny or Disaster", SFWA Bulletin Spring 2002.

+ "Our Five Days with John W. Campbell" SFWA Bulletin, Fall 2006. + "Three Days with Leigh Brackett & Edmond Hamilton", New York Review Of SF, November 2009.

== See also ==
- List of people from Florida
- List of American novelists
- List of science fiction writers
- List of short story writers
- List of University of Alabama people
