= Arthur Sellings =

British writer (1921–1968)

- Arthur Sellings c.1956
- Born: Arthur Gordon Ley; 31 May 1921; Tunbridge Wells, Kent, England
- Died: 24 September 1968 (aged 47); Worthing, Sussex, England
- Occupations: Author, scientist
- Writing career
- Pen name: Ray Luther, Martin Luther
- Language: English
- Genre: Science fiction

Arthur Sellings was the pseudonym of Arthur Gordon Ley, (31 May 1921 – 24 September 1968) an English scientist, book and art dealer, and science fiction author. In addition to Sellings he also used the pseudonyms Ray Luther and Martin Luther for his publications. He is known best for his well-crafted descriptions of adaptability during stress, in stories noted for their humor, suspense and attention to plot and character. His posthumous novel Junk Day is considered his best work.

== Life and career ==
Ley was born on 31 May 1921 in Tunbridge Wells, Kent, England, the son of Arthur James Ley and Stella Grace (Sellings) Ley. As well as his native town, he also lived in Kensington and, later, Worthing. He married, on 17 August 1945 in Stoke Newington, Gladys Pamela Judge.

In addition to his writing, Ley was a book and art dealer and antiquarian and, from 1955 to 1968, a scientific researcher for the British government. His success for a 1955 writing contest sponsored by The Observer resulted in the publication of his first book, Time Transfer, by Michael Joseph Ltd. His research work inspired some of his science fiction. His work appeared in Fantastic, Galaxy Science Fiction, Imagination, The Magazine of Fantasy & Science Fiction, Nebula Science Fiction, New Worlds, New Writings in SF, and Worlds of Tomorrow, among other periodicals.

Ley died of heart failure on 24 September 1968 in Worthing, Sussex, England.

== Bibliography ==
=== Novels ===
- Telepath (1962)
- The Uncensored Man (1964)
- The Quy Effect (1966)
- Intermind (as by Ray Luther) (1967)
- The Power of X (1968)
- Junk Day (1970)

=== Collections ===
- Time Transfer and Other Stories (1956)
- The Long Eureka: a Collection of Short Stories (1968)

=== Short stories ===
- "The Haunting" (1953)
- "The Boys from Vespis" (Feb. 1954)
- "The Departed" (Aug. 1954)
- "A Start in Life" (1954)
- "The Cautious Invaders" (Oct. 1954)
- "The Age of Kindness" (1954)
- "The Mission" (1955)
- "The Figment" (1955)
- "Escape Mechanism" (1955)
- "The Proxies" (1955)
- "Jukebox" (1955)
- "Cry Wolf" (Jul. 1956)
- "Armistice" (Nov. 1956)
- "Birthright" (1956)
- "The Warriors" (Aug. 1956)
- "The Masters" (1956)
- "Categorical Imperative" (1956)
- "Control Room" (1956)
- "Time Transfer" (1956)
- "From Up There" (1956)
- "The Wordless Ones" (1956)
- "The Transfer" (1956)
- "Pentagram" (1956)
- "Soliloquy" (1956)
- "The Awakening" (1956)
- "The Category Inventors" (1956)
- "One Across" (1956)
- "Verbal Agreement" (1956)
- "Fresh Start" (Jul. 1957)
- "Brink of Madness" (1957)
- "Limits" (1958)
- "Blank Form" (1958)
- "The Shadow People" (1958)
- "Flatiron" (1958)
- "The Long Eureka" (1959)
- "For the Colour of His Hair" (1959)
- "The Tycoons" (1959)
- "The Scene Shifter" (1959)
- "The Outstretched Hand" (1959)
- "Starting Course" (1961)
- "The Well-Trained Heroes" (Jun. 1964)
- "The Power of Y" (1965)
- "The Tinplate Teleologist" (1965)
- "Gifts of the Gods" (1966)
- "That Evening Sun Go Down" (1966)
- "The Key of the Door" (1967)
- "The Last Time Around" (1968)
- "Trade-In" (1968)
- "Homecoming" (1968)
- "Crack in the Shield" (Jan. 1968)
- "The Trial" (1969)
- "The Legend and the Chemistry" (Jan. 1969)
- "The Dodgers" (Apr. 1969)

=== Nonfiction ===
- "Where Now?" (1961)
