= Ernest Hill (author) =

British writer (1915–2003)

- Born: 14 July 1915; Stourbridge, Worcestershire, England
- Died: May 2003; Greenwich, London, England
- Occupations: Author, advertisement manager
- Writing career
- Genre: Science fiction

Ernest Hill (14 July 1915 – May 2003) was an English science fiction author and advertisement manager who was active as a writer from the mid-1960s through the mid-1970s.

== Life ==
Hill was born in Stourbridge, Worcestershire, England to Ernest and Agnes Hill. His father was a farmer. He was brought up in Stratford-upon-Avon and attended Warwick School. He reported he "played a great deal of sport when younger." He lived in Europe during and between the wars, and became fluent in German. After a period in which he lived "in an ancient mill-house where the original water wheel ground the charcoal for some of the first gunpowder used for lethal purposes in Europe" he came to reside in London.

Hill married Marjorie Potter on 1 April 1950. He had two children, Kenneth and Raymond, born in the 1930s, presumably from an earlier marriage. He died in Greenwich, London.

== Career ==
Hill worked as a farmer, policeman, soldier, civil servant, and from 1955 onward advertisement manager for the technical journal Consulting Engineer. He was also a script writer for Zeta from 1963 to 1964.

== Writing ==
Hill first published science fiction story was "The Last Generation," which appeared in the January 1964 issue of New Worlds. His short stories in the genre are considered of some interest, particularly the Dystopian "Atrophy" and the satiric "Chemotopia." Others, such as "Joik," together with his novels, are not rated as highly.

Hill also composed poetry as a hobby. He also wrote plays; he had a long-standing interest in verse plays acted by various amateur theatre groups, and won first prize at the Beckenham Drama Festival in 1958 for his play "Gods in Retirement." He continued to keep up on developments in theatre and literature throughout his life. His literary interests included Frederik Pohl, Vladimir Nabokov, and Isaac Asimov.

== Bibliography ==
=== Novels ===
- Pity About Earth (1968)
- The GC Radiation (1971)
- The Quark Invasion (1978)

=== Short stories ===
- "Gamma Positive" (1964)
- "Joik" (1964)
- "The Last Generation" (1964)
- "Atrophy" (1965)
- "Chemotopia" (1965)
- "Democratic Autocracy" (1965)
- "The Saga of Sid" (1965)
- "The Inheritors" (1966)
- "On the Edge of the Galaxy" (1966)
- "The Sub-liminal" (1966)
- "The Hero" (1970)
- "The Stenth Dimension" (1970)
- "The Phylogenetic Factor" (1971)
- "Tip of the Iceberg" (1971)
- "The Z Factor" (1976)

== Other references ==
- Contemporary Science Fiction Authors, Robert Reginald, Wildside Press, 1 January 2009
- Science Fiction and Fantasy Literature, Volume 2, R. Reginald, Wildside Press, 2010, ISBN 9780941028783
- Clute, John; Peter Nichols (1993). The Encyclopedia of Science Fiction. New York: St. Martin's Press. p. 565.
- Ibid, online version
