= John Rankine (writer) =

British writer

John Rankine (born Douglas Rankine Mason; 26 September 1918 – 8 August 2013) was a British science fiction author, who wrote books as John Rankine and Douglas R. Mason. Rankine was born in Hawarden, Flintshire, Wales, attended Chester Grammar School, and in 1937 began study of English Literature and Experimental Psychology at the University of Manchester, where he was a friend of Anthony Burgess (mentioned in Burgess's autobiography, Little Wilson And Big God).

His first short story Two's Company was published in 1964, and his first novel From Carthage Then I Came followed in 1966.

His 1972 novel The Resurrection of Roger Diment features the idea of an abbreviated life span for people, a theme which may have been adapted from William F. Nolan's novel Logan's Run, though Mason's story was developed differently.

Rankine also wrote television novels set in the same universe as the television series Space: 1999.

== Bibliography ==
=== Novels ===
- From Carthage Then I Came a.k.a. Eight Against Utopia (1966)
- Ring of Violence (1968)
- The Tower of Rizwan (1968)
- Landfall is a State of Mind (1968)
- The Weisman Experiment (1969)
- The Janus Syndrome (1969)
- Matrix (1969)
- Horizon Alpha (1971)
- Dilation Effect (1971)
- Satellite 54-Zero (1971)
- The Resurrection of Roger Diment (1972)
- The End Bringers (1973)
- The Phaeton Condition (1973)
- Operation Umanaq (1973)
- The Omega Worm (1976)
- Pitman's Progress (1976)
- Euphor Unfree (1977)
- Mission to Pactolus R. (1978)
- The Star of Hesiock (1980)
- The Typhon Intervention (1981)
- In the Eye of the Storm (2001)
- The Darkling Plain (2001)

=== Series ===
Dag Fletcher

1. The Blockade of Sinitron (1966) [as by John Rankine]
2. Interstellar Two-Five (1966) [as by John Rankine]
3. One is One (1968) [as by John Rankine]
4. The Plantos Affair (1971) [as by John Rankine]
5. The Ring of Garamas (1972) [as by John Rankine]
6. The Bromius Phenomenon (1973) [as by John Rankine]

Space 1999

- 2 Moon Odyssey (1975) [as by John Rankine]
- 5 Lunar Attack (1975) [as by John Rankine]
- 6 Astral Quest (1975) [as by John Rankine]
- 8 Android Planet (1976) [as by John Rankine]
- 10 Phoenix of Megaron (1976) [as by John Rankine]

Space Corporation

1. Never the Same Door (1968) [as by John Rankine]
2. Moons of Triopus (1968) [as by John Rankine]

Also Binary Z (1969) [as by John Rankine]

=== Collections ===
- Tuo Yaw (2003)
- BAZOZZ ZZZ DZZ: And Other Short Stories (2003)

=== Anthologies containing stories by Douglas R Mason ===
- New Writings in SF 1 (1964)
- New Writings in SF 7 (1966)
- New Writings in SF 9 (1966)
- New Writings in SF 11 (1968)
- New Writings in SF 16 (1969)
- New Writings in SF 21 (1972)

=== Short stories ===
- "Folly to Be Wise" (1966)
- "The Man Who Missed the Ferry" (1966)
- "There Was This Fella..." (1968)
- "Locust Years" (1968)
- "All Done by Mirrors" (1969)
- "Algora One Six" (1972)
- "Second Run at the Data" (1971)
