= Donald Malcolm =

Scottish author

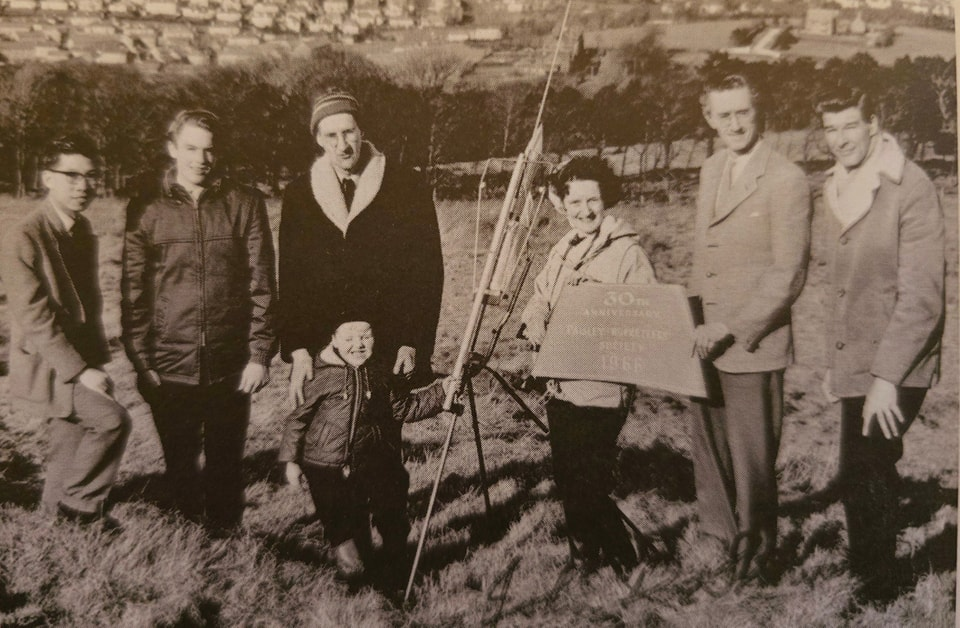
- Members of the Paisley Rocketeers society; Donald Malcolm is pictured on the far right.
- Born: 28 September 1930; London, England
- Died: 9 November 2013 (aged 83); Paisley, Scotland
- Occupation: Author
- Writing career
- Pen name: Roy Malcolm
- Genre: Science fiction
- Notable work: Iron Rain

Donald Malcolm (1930–2013) was a Scottish science fiction writer and author of popular science and local history. Some of his nonfiction was written under the pen name Roy Malcolm.

Malcolm was born in London in 1930 and adopted into a Paisley family in infancy. He later recalled arriving in the town with only a teddy bear, an experience which has been noted as influencing his later life and writing.

Malcolm was an active philatelist and a member of the Paisley Philatelic Society. He served as editor of Air Mail News from 1972 to 1979 and contributed widely to philatelic publications, particularly in the field of aerophilately. His works in this area included studies of aviation events and postal history, as well as The Paisley Rocketeers (1997).

He began his writing career in 1955 with astronomical and astronautical articles, and served as Secretary of the Association in Scotland to Research into Astronautics (ASTRA), a society focused on space research and closely associated with science fiction writers.

His work reflected a longstanding interest in space, science, and society, which spanned his scientific writing, fiction, and historical research.

== Career ==
Malcolm's work was published in the magazines New Worlds, Nebula Science Fiction, Astounding Science Fiction, the anthology series New Writings in SF, and the anthologies Out of This World 4 (1964), Lambda I and Other Stories (1965), and Starfield (1989). His reviews appeared in the magazine Vector.

Much of Malcolm's short fiction falls into two sequences, the "Preliminary Exploration Team" and the "Dream Background" stories. Neither series has been collected. His novels, both published by Laser Books, have been noted for their focus on speculative and conceptual themes.

Malcolm was part of the mid-20th century British science fiction scene, with work appearing in magazines such as New Worlds, Nebula Science Fiction, and Astounding Science Fiction.

In later life, Malcolm wrote a number of local history works about Paisley, including The Paisley Rocketeers (1997), a study of the Paisley Rocketeers society. His work has been associated with the social and cultural history of post-war Paisley, and he has been described as a “chronicler of memory, modernity and the margins” in that context.

== Bibliography ==
=== Science fiction ===
==== Novels ====
- The Iron Rain (1976)
- The Unknown Shore (1976)
- The Jixers (2009)

==== Short stories ====
- "Defence Mechanism" (1957)
- "The Long Ellipse" (1958)
- "The House of Lights" (1958)
- "Lone Voyager" (1958)
- "The Stuff of Dreams" (1959)
- "Complex" (1959)
- "Almost Obsolete" (1959)
- "The Pathfinders" (1960)
- "The Winds of Truth" (1960)
- "Test Case" (1960)
- "The Other Face" (1961)
- "Yorick" (1962)
- "Twice Bitten" (1963)
- "Dilemma with Three Horns" (1964)
- "Beyond the Reach of Storms" (1964)
- "Potential" (1965)
- "First Dawn" (1965)
- "The Big Day" (1971)
- "A Strange and Terrible Sea" (1974)
- "The Enemy Within" (1975)
- "Between the Tides" (1976)
- "For Some Dark Purpose" (1989)

=== Nonfiction ===
==== Books ====
- Yesterday's Paisley (1991), Stenlake Publishing
- Coal Flowers: Memories of a Paisley Childhood (1996), Stenlake Publishing
- The Paisley Rocketeers (1997), Stenlake Publishing
- Paisley Since the War (2000), Stenlake Publishing
- Old Johnstone and Elderslie (2005), Stenlake Publishing
- Recollections of Paisley (2013), Stenlake Publishing

==== Articles ====
- "A Tenth Planet?" (1955)
- "Is Bode's Law a Coincidence?" (1955)
- "Lunar Observatory" (1956)
- "Whose Moon?" (1956)
- "Halley - The Man and the Comet" (1957)
- "Satellites and the I.G.Y." (1957)
- "Moons of Jupiter" (1958)
- "First Breakthrough" (1958)
- "Who Rules in Space" (1958)
- "Fallacies in Science Fiction" (1963)

==== Reviews ====
- " 'The Deep Reaches of Space' by A. Bertram Chandler" (1964)
- " 'The View From the Stars' by Walter M. Miller" (1965)
- " 'Raiders from the Rings' by Alan E. Nourse" (1965)

== General references ==
- Donald Malcolm at the Internet Speculative Fiction Database
