= Dan Morgan (writer) =

- Dan Morgan (right) with his literary and musical collaborator John Kippax, c.1957
- Born: 24 December 1925; Holbeach, Lincolnshire, England
- Died: 4 November 2011 (aged 85); Lincolnshire
- Occupations: Author, guitarist
- Writing career
- Genre: Science fiction

Dan Morgan (24 December 1925 – 4 November 2011) was an English science fiction writer and a professional guitarist, mainly active as a writer from the early 1950s through the mid-1970s. In addition to his fiction, he wrote two manuals relating to his musical profession.

Morgan is best known for his Sixth Perception novels, featuring a group of characters possessed of psychic powers; the three Venturer Twelve space operas, co-authored with his colleague John Kippax (a fourth was written by Kippax alone); and the somewhat tongue-in-cheek novel The Richest Corpse in Show Business.

== Bibliography ==
=== Science fiction ===
==== The Sixth Perception ====
- The New Minds (1967)
- The Several Minds (1969)
- The Mind Trap (1970)
- The Country of the Mind (1975)

==== Venturer Twelve ====
- A Thunder of Stars (with John Kippax) (1968)
- Seed of Stars (with John Kippax) (1972)
- The Neutral Stars (with John Kippax) (1973)

==== Other novels ====
- Cee Tee Man (1955)
- The Uninhibited (1961)
- The Richest Corpse in Show Business (1967)
- Inside (1971)
- The High Destiny (1973)
- The Concrete Horizon (1976)

==== Short stories ====
- "Alien Analysis" (1952)
- "Amateur Talent" (1953)
- "Home Is Tomorrow" (1953)
- "Cleansing Fires" (1954)
- "Forgive Them" (1954)
- "Psychic Twin" (1954)
- "Jerry Built" (1954)
- "Alcoholic Ambassador" (1954)
- "Trojan Hearse" (with John Kippax) (1954)
- "Kwakiutl" (1955)
- "The Lesser Breed" (1955)
- "Life Agency" (1955)
- "The Earth Never Sets" (1956)
- "The Way I Am" (1956)
- "The Whole Armour" (1956)
- "The Little Fleet" (1956)
- "Controlled Flight" (1956)
- "Wunkle" (1956)
- "Beast of the Field" (1956)
- "More than Hormone" (1956)
- "The Humanitarian" (1957)
- "The Unwanted" (1958)
- "The Star Game" (1958)
- "The Hard Way" (1958)
- "Insecurity Risk" (1959)
- "Protected Planet" (1959)
- "Drive Out of Mind" (1960)
- "Stopover Earth" (1961)
- "Father" (1961)
- "Emreth" (1965)
- "Parking Problem" (1965)
- "Third Party" (1965)
- "Scramble" (1971)
- "Canary" (1972)
- "The First Day of the Rest of Your Life" (1974)
- "Young Tom" (1976)
- "Love in Limbo" (2003)

=== Nonfiction ===
==== Manuals ====
- Guitar (1965)
- Spanish Guitar (1982)

==== Letters ====
- "Letter" (Vector 60) (1972)
- "Letter" (Vector 61) (1972)
- "Letter" (Vector 62) (1972)

==== Obituaries ====
- "Edward John Carnell 1912 – 1972" (with Harry Harrison, Ted Tubb and Brian W. Aldiss) (1972)
- "John Kippax Dies" (1974)
