= H. A. Hargreaves =

Canadian writer and English professor (1928–2017)

Henry A. Hargreaves, Ph.D. (1928-2017) was a prolific Canadian science fiction writer. Originally from Bronx, N.Y., Hargreaves was a pioneer of Canadian short fiction as well as having an academic career that culminated with him retiring as a professor emeritus of English Literature at the University of Alberta.

His short fiction was collected in one of Canadian science fiction's earliest anthologies: North By 2000, published in 1975 and was re-issued as North by 2000+ in 2012 with additional material, with such short stories as "Fore" - Eight - Sixteen, In His Moccasins, Infinite Variation, and 2020 Vision.

Hargreaves released an introspective memoir Growing Up Bronx: A Memoir of my Shapers and Shakers in 2012.

In 2015, Hargreaves was inducted into the Canadian Science Fiction & Fantasy Association Hall of Fame, whilst living in retirement in Claresholm, Alberta, with his wife. He had a wife, Margaret, with whom he had two daughters. He died on July 27, 2017.
