= William Browning Spencer =

American novelist

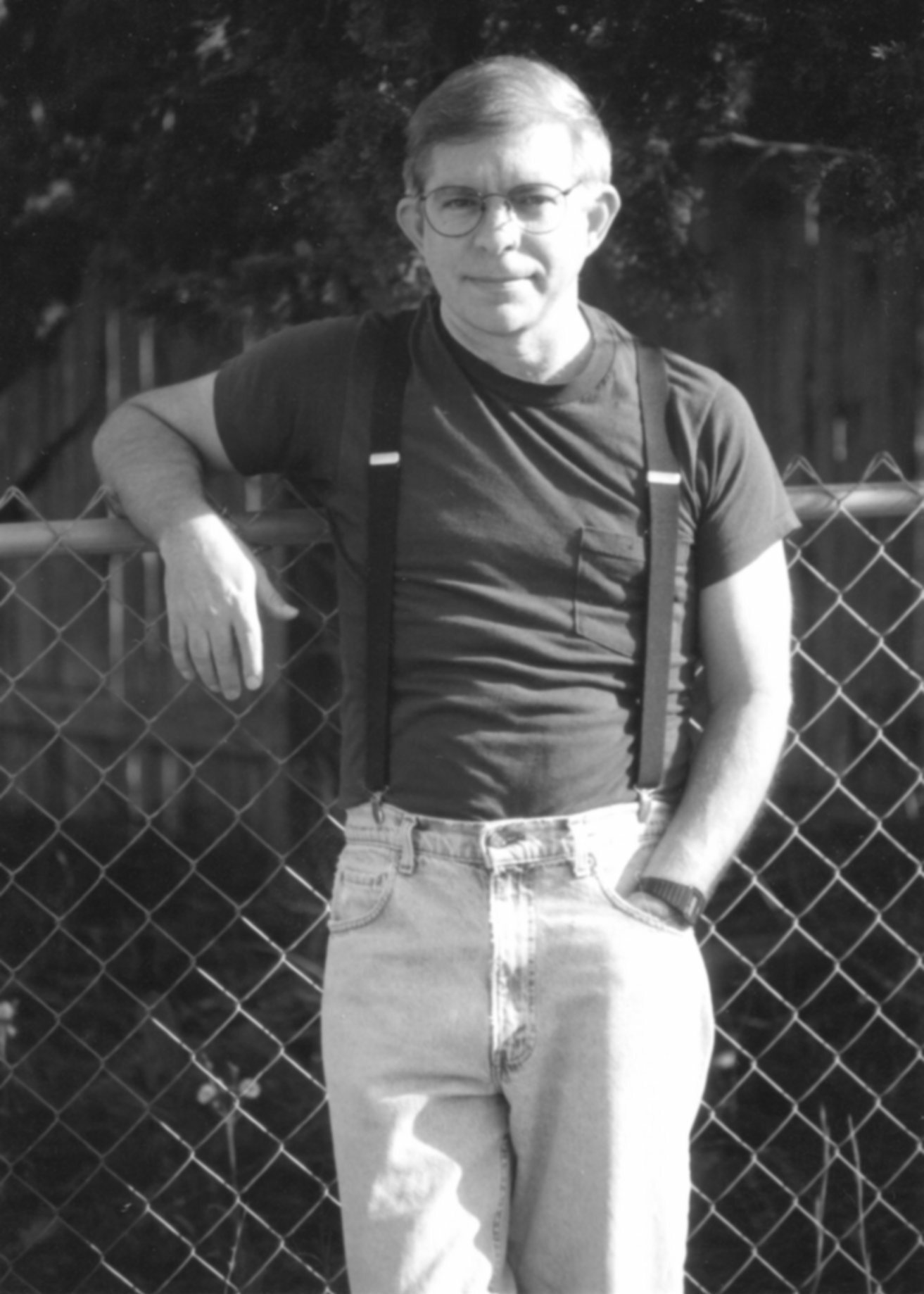
William Browning Spencer in 1995

William Browning Spencer (born 1946) is an American novelist and short story writer living in Austin, Texas. His science fiction and horror stories are often darkly and surrealistically humorous.

== Awards and honors ==
His novel Résumé With Monsters won the International Horror Critics Guild Award for Best Novel in 1995. His first novel, Maybe I'll Call Anna, was a National Endowment of the Arts New American Writing Award winner. His novels and short stories have been finalists for the Bram Stoker Award, the World Fantasy Award, and the Shirley Jackson Award. His short stories have been anthologized numerous times, including twice in The Year's Best Fantasy and Horror and twice in The Year's Best Science Fiction. In 1995, he was Toastmaster of ArmadilloCon 21 in Austin, TX.

== Bibliography ==
=== Novels ===
- Maybe I'll Call Anna, Permanent Press (1990)
- Résumé With Monsters, Permanent Press (1995). Reprint: Dover Publications (2014)
- Zod Wallop. St. Martin's Press (1995). Reprint: White Wolf Publishing (1996)
- Irrational Fears, White Wolf Publishing (1998)

=== Short fiction ===
==== Collections ====
- The Return of Count Electric & Other Stories, Permanent Press (1993)
- The Ocean and All Its Devices, Subterranean Press (2006)
- The Unorthodox Dr. Draper And Other Stories, Subterranean Press (2017)

==== List of short stories ====
The Return of Count Electric (1993)
Title	Notes
The Wedding Photographer in Crisis	
Haunted by the Horror King	
The Entomologists at Obala	
The Return of Count Electric	
Graven Images	
Pep Talk	In 2005, this story was adapted as a short film by writer Eric B. Anderson and director Scott Smith (Project Greenlight) and premiered at the Santa Fe Film Festival in December 2006.
Looking Out for Eleanor	
Snow	
A Child's Christmas in Florida	Adapted as a short film entitled "A Child's Christmas in Texas" Screenwriters: Carolyn Banks and Jessica Gardner, Producer: Carolyn Banks, Director: Jessica Gardner. Can be viewed on YouTube.
Best Man	
Daughter Doom	

The Ocean and All Its Devices (2006)
Title/First published	Notes
The Ocean and All Its Devices, 1994	
The Oddskeeper's Daughter, 1995	
The Death of the Novel, 1995	Bram Stoker Award finalist in Best Short Story category
Downloading Midnight, 1995	
Your Faithful Servant, 1993	
"The Foster Child", F&SF, 98 (6): 71–81, June 2000	Locus Magazine Award finalist in Best Short Story category
The Halfway House at the Heart of Darkness, 1998	
The Lights of Armageddon, 1994	
The Essayist in the Wilderness, 2002	World Fantasy Award finalist in Best Short Story category

The Unorthodox Dr. Draper and Other Stories (2017)
Title/First published	Notes
How the Gods Bargain	
Penguins of the Apocalypse, 2008	Shirley Jackson Award finalist in Novelette category
Come Lurk with Me and Be My Love	
The Tenth Muse, 2007	Bram Stoker Award finalist in Long Fiction category, Shirley Jackson Award finalist in Novelette category
Stone and the Librarian, 2007	
The Indelible Dark, 2013	
The Dappled Thing	
Usurped	
The Unorthodox Dr. Draper and Other Stories	
The Love Song of A. Alhazred Azathoth	Included in "2009 Rhysling Anthology: The Best SF, Fantasy & Horror Poetry of 2009"
