= R. W. Mackelworth =

English science fiction author

- Born: 7 April 1930; London, England
- Died: 15 January 2000 (aged 69); Farnham, Surrey, England
- Occupation: Author
- Writing career
- Genre: Science fiction

Ronald Walter Mackelworth (7 April 1930 – 15 January 2000) was an English science fiction author (who also worked as an insurance salesman). He was active as a writer in the late 1960s and early 1970s and wrote as R. W. Mackelworth.

== Bibliography ==
=== Novels ===
- Firemantle (1968, AKA The Diabols (1969))
- Tiltangle (1970)
- Starflight 3000 (1972)
- The Year of the Painted World (1975)
- Shakehole (1981)

=== Short stories ===
- "The Statue" (1963)
- "I, the Judge" (1963)
- "Pattern of Risk" (1963)
- "The Rotten Borough" (1963)
- "The Cliff-Hangers" (1963)
- "The Unexpected Martyr" (1964)
- "The Expanding Man" (1965)
- "The Last Man Home" (1965)
- "A Cave in the Hills" (1965)
- "The Changing Shape of Charlie Snuff" (1965)
- "Last Man Home" (1965)
- "A Distorting Mirror" (1965)
- "Temptation for the Leader" (1965)
- "Cleaner than Clean" (1965)
- "Final Solution" (1966)
- "A Touch of Immortality" (1966)
- "The Final Solution" (1966)
- "A Visitation of Ghosts" (1966)
- "Tilt Angle" (1969)
- "Two Rivers" (1970)
- "Mr. Nobody" (1971)

== General references ==
- R. W. Mackelworth at the Internet Speculative Fiction Database
- Clute, John; Peter Nichols (1993). The Encyclopedia of Science Fiction. New York: St. Martin's Press. p. 759. ISBN 978-0-312-09618-2.
