= Vincent King =

Vincent King (Rex Thomas Vinson)
- Born: 22 October 1935; Falmouth, Cornwall, England
- Died: May 2000 (aged 64)
- Occupation: Author
- Writing career
- Genre: Science fiction

Rex Thomas Vinson (22 October 1935 – May 2000) was an English science fiction author active in writing in the late 1960s and early 1970s, who wrote under the pen name of Vincent King.

== Writing career ==
King's novels were published by Gollancz, Tandem, Sphere Books and Futura Publications in England, and Ballantine Books in the United States. His short fiction was published in John Carnell's New Writings in SF series. Some of his work has been translated into French, Spanish and German.

His most successful book was his novel Candy Man (1971), which went through a number of editions in the United Kingdom, the United States, and other countries, and was a selection of the UK Science Fiction Book Club in 1972.

John Clute, writing in The Encyclopedia of Science Fiction, said that his later novels "tend to combine elements of epic and grotesque sf adventure with a characteristically English darkness of emotional colouring ... and a tendency towards downbeat conclusions."

== Bibliography ==
=== Novels ===
- Light a Last Candle (1969)
- Candy Man (1971)
- Another End (1971)
- Time Snake and Superclown (1976)

=== Short stories ===
- "Defense Mechanism" (1966)
- "The Wall to End the World" (1967)
- "Testament" (1968)
- "The Eternity Game" (1969)
- "Report from Linelos" (1969)
- "The Discontent Contingency" (1971)
