= Sydney James Bounds =

British author

- Born: 4 November 1920; Brighton, England, UK
- Died: 24 November 2006 (aged 86); Telford, Shropshire
- Occupation: Author
- Writing career
- Genre: Science fiction

Sydney James Bounds (4 November 1920 – 24 November 2006) was a British author. He published as Sydney J. Bounds and S. J. Bounds, as well as using the pseudonyms Clifford Wallace, James Marshall, Earl Ellison and Rex Marlowe. He wrote more than forty novels and hundreds of short stories, many published using pseudonyms or anonymously. He was known best for his science fiction, but also wrote horror, Westerns, mysteries and juveniles.

Bounds' debut professional sale using his own name occurred during 1946 in the first issue of the magazine Outlands, the publication of which left Bounds feeling that his post-war career as an electrical fitter was less interesting than one writing fiction.

Bounds never married. He lived in Kingston upon Thames until May 2006, when he relocated to Telford, Shropshire where he died on 25 November 2006 at the age of 86. Since 2007 his name is honoured by the British Fantasy Awards' Sydney J. Bounds Best Newcomer Award (a revival of the earlier Icarus and Newcomer Awards), which is sponsored and funded by his estate.

In 2013, his short story "The Animators" was made into a movie called The Last Days on Mars.

== Selective bibliography ==
=== Science fiction ===
==== Novels ====
- Frontier Legion (1952–53) (magazine publication only)
- The Adaptable Planet (1953) (magazine publication only)
- Dimension of Horror (1953)
- Project Starship (1954) (magazine publication only)
- The Moon Raiders (1955)
- Frontier Encounter (1956) (magazine publication only)
- The Robot Brains (1956)
- The World Wrecker (1956)

==== Collections ====
- The Best of Sydney J. Bounds, Volume 1: Strange Portrait and Other Stories (2005)
- The Best of Sydney J. Bounds, Volume 2: The Wayward Ship and other Stories (2005)

==== Short stories ====
- "Young Blood"
- "Too Efficient" (1949)
- "The Spirit of Earth" (1950)
- "Vultures of the Void" (1950) (as Clifford Wallace)
- "Liaison Service" (1951)
- "The City" (1951)
- "The Treasure of Tagor" (1952)
- "A Matter of Salvage" (1952)
- "The Flame Gods" (1952)
- "Cardillo's Shadow" (1953)
- "John Brown's Body" (1954)
- "It's Dark Out There" (1954)
- "Weather Station" (1954)
- "Portrait of a Spaceman" (1954)
- "First Trip" (1954)
- "Time for Murder" (1955)
- "Sole Survivor" (1955)
- "The Active Man" (1955)
- "The Beautiful Martian" (1955)
- "Grant in Aid" (1956)
- "Act of Courage" (1956)
- "Leave" (1956)
- "We Call It Home" (1956)
- "Mutation" (1956)
- "First Lesson" (1956)
- "Reaching for the Stars" (1956)
- "Random Power" (1956)
- "The Wayward Ship" (1958)
- "Outside" (1958)
- "The Mules" (1958)
- "Out There" (1962)
- "Scissors" (1964)
- "Private Shape" (1964)
- "World of Shadows" (1966)
- "Public Service" (1968)
- "Throwback" (1969)
- "The Ballad of Luna Lil" (1969)
- "The Flesh is Weak" (1969)
- "House of Fear" (1970)
- "Limbo Rider" (1970)
- "Musicale" (1970)
- "Cold Sleep" (1971)
- "The Possessed" (1972)
- "The Ghost Train" (1972)
- "Monitor" (1973)
- "The Haunted Tower" (1973)
- "Hothouse" (1974)
- "The Mask" (1974)
- "Room at the Inn" (1974)
- "Starport" (1974)
- "Talent Spotter" (1975)
- "The Animators" (1975)
- "Homecoming" (1975)
- "The Man in the Mirror" (1975)
- "The Guardian at Hell's Mouth" (1975)
- "A Little Night Fishing" (1976)
- "The Pauper's Feast" (1976)
- "An Eye for Beauty" (1976)
- "A Complete Collection" (1976)
- "The Haunted Circus" (1977)
- "No-Face" (1978)
- "Hunters' Hill" (1978)
- "The Night Walkers" (1979)
- "The Circus" (1980)
- "Ghost Hunter" (1981)
- "The Train Watchers" (1982)
- "Spirit of the Trail" (1983)
- "House of Horror" (1985)
- "Final Contact" (1988)
- "Mage of the Monkeys" (1990)
- "Drink to the Good Old Days" (1990)
- "The Lonely Alien" (1996)
- "The Long Journey" (1997)
- "No Way Back" (1998)
- "The Silver Disc" (1998) (with John Russell Fearn)
- "A Matter of Vibration" (1999) (with John Russell Fearn)
- "Advent" (1999)
- "Private Mage" (1999)
- "Swarm of the Red Giant" (2000)
- "Rendezvous" (2000)
- "In Solitary" (2001)
- "The Face of the Deep" (2002)
- "Shapeless" (2002)
- "The Tapestry" (2003)
- "Moon Dive" (2003)
- "The Trunk" (2003)
- "The Wall" (2003)
- "All in the Mind" (2003)
- "A Present from Earth" (2004)
- "Dreamboat" (2004)
- "Half-Hero" (2004)
- "Sunskimmer" (2006)

=== Mystery and horror novels ===
- Carla's Revenge (1951)
- Dragnet (1951)
- Hell Hath No Fury (1951) (as Rex Marlowe)
- Terror Rides the West Wind (1951)
- Dimension of Horror (1953)
- Mission of the Brains (1957)
- Two Times Murder (1960)
- The Girl Hunters (1964)
- The Cleopatra Syndicate (1982)
- Boomerang (1990)
- Enforcer (1990)
- Two Times Murder (2004)
- Murder in Space (2007)
- Sword of Damocles (2008)

=== Western novels ===
- Gunman's Revenge (1951) (as James Marshal) (aka Killer Unmasked (2000) (as Alexander Black))
- Gunhand (1957) (as Wes Sanders) (aka Vermilion Springs' Vendetta (2000)
- A Man Called Savage (2000)
- Shadow of the Noose (2001)
- Savage's Feud (2002)
- The Savage River (2003)
- Border Savage (2004)
- Savage – Manhunter (2004)
- Savage's Quest (2005)
- Savage's Trap (2005)
- Savage Rides West (2007)

== General references ==
- Scifipedia entry
- Sydney J. Bounds at the Internet Speculative Fiction Database
- Fantastic Fiction entry
- Blurb on Bounds at Cosmos Books
- Darlington, Andrew. "Strange, And Stranger Portraits: Sydney J. Bounds" – interview at the Zone
- Holland, Steve. “Sydney J. Bounds (1920–2006)” – obituary and appreciation by a blogger
