= Michael G. Coney =

British writer (1932–2005)

- Born: Michael Greatrex Coney; 28 September 1932; Birmingham, England
- Died: 4 November 2005 (aged 73); Saanichton, British Columbia
- Education: King Edward's School, Birmingham
- Occupations: Accountant, Management consultant, Hotel manager, BC Forest Services, Novelist
- Writing career
- Genre: Science fiction
- Website: sf-encyclopedia.com/Entry/coney_michael_g

Michael Greatrex Coney (1932–2005) was a British science fiction writer, best known for his novel Hello Summer, Goodbye.

== Biography ==
Coney was born in Birmingham, England, on 28 September 1932, and attended King Edward's School, Birmingham. In the 1950s and 1960s, Coney worked as a clerk, accountant, and tenant landlord. During the 1960s, Coney began developing his writing, published his first story, "Sixth Sense" in Vision of Tomorrow in 1969. That year, he and his wife moved to Antigua, where they managed a local hotel for a few years. He published his first book, Mirror Image, in 1972. The following year, the couple moved to Victoria, British Columbia, in 1973, where Coney was a management specialist with the British Columbia Forest Service (BCFS), which he discussed in Forest Adventure: A Guide to the British Columbia Forest Museum (1985). Coney worked with the BCFS until his retirement in 1989. He died from pleural mesothelioma, a cancer of the lining of the lungs, in Saanichton on 4 November 2005.

== Works ==
A common element in Coney's work is that of ordinary people buffeted by forces beyond their strength, and mostly not much concerned with them. Most SF gives superior power to the main characters or has them acquire it during the course of the tale. Coney satirised it in The Hero of Downways.

The stories also relate to the cultural concerns of the time. His first novel, Mirror Image (1972), intensified the American genre's Cold War emphasis on impostors and secret invaders; in this case, the "amorphs", who are indistinguishable from terrestrials, are themselves convinced that they are human.

After a first group of dystopian tales, Coney began to change his themes. His later works The Celestial Steam Locomotive and Gods of the Greataway could almost be set on a transfigured Vancouver Island.

Another of Coney's themes concerns small isolated communities, as in The Hero of Downways, Winter's Children and Fang, the Gnome. In Syzygy the inhabitants of a small town, a fairly recent settlement on an alien planet, struggle to survive the hidden dangers of the planet's ecosystem; in Brontomek! the same characters a few years later face a wholly human threat.

A different perspective is seen in his Hello Summer, Goodbye, an adventure/mystery among people who are not quite human, on a planet rather like Earth, but with significant differences. It is generally agreed to be his best novel. I Remember Pallahaxi, a previously unpublished sequel to Hello Summer, Goodbye, was published posthumously in 2007.

Brontomek! received the British Science Fiction Association award for best novel of 1976. He was nominated for a Nebula Award in 1995 for his novelette "Tea and Hamsters".

== Awards and nominations ==
Awards for Coney's work
| Year | Work | Award | Result | Ref. |
|---|---|---|---|---|
| 1977 | Brontomek! | British Science Fiction Association Award | Winner | |
| 1983 | Cat Karina | Aurora Award for Best Novel | Finalist | |
| 1985 | The Celestial Steam Locomotive | Aurora Award for Best Novel | Finalist | |
| 1991 | King of the Scepter'd Isle | Aurora Award for Best Novel | Finalist | |
| 1994 | "Sophie's Spyglass" | Aurora Award for Best Short Fiction | Finalist | |
| 1995 | "Tea and Hamsters" | Nebula Award for Best Novelette | Finalist | |
| 1996 | "Tea and Hamsters" | Aurora Award for Best Short Fiction | Finalist | |

== Books ==
=== Novels ===
- Mirror Image (1972)
- Syzygy (1973)
- Friends Come in Boxes (1973)
- The Hero of Downways (1973)
- Winter's Children (1974)
- Monitor Found in Orbit (1974) (Short story collection)
- The Jaws that Bite, the Claws that Catch (1974; UK title The Girl with a Symphony in her Fingers)
- Hello Summer, Goodbye (UK title, also known as Rax in USA, and Pallahaxi Tide in Canada; 1975)
- Charisma (1975)
- Brontomek! (1976)
- The Ultimate Jungle (1979)
- Neptune's Cauldron (1981)
- Cat Karina (1982)
- The Celestial Steam Locomotive (1983)
- Gods of the Greataway (1984)
- Fang, the Gnome (1988)
- King of the Scepter'd Isle (1989)
- A Tomcat Called Sabrina (1992)
- No Place for a Sealion (1992)
- I Remember Pallahaxi (2007; sequel to Hello Summer, Goodbye — published posthumously)
- Flower of Goronwy (2014; published posthumously)

The Celestial Steam Locomotive and Gods of the Greataway are two parts of a single tale, Cat Karina, Fang, the Gnome and King of the Scepter'd Isle are independent stories set in the same universe. Brontomek! is set on the same world as Syzygy (and has many of the same characters) and is also associated somewhat with Mirror Image and Charisma.

=== Non-fiction ===
- Forest Ranger, Ahoy! Porthole Press, Sidney BC, 1983.
- Forest Adventure: a guide to the British Columbia Forest Museum. By Gray Campbell and Michael Coney. Porthole Press, Sidney BC, 1985.

== Sources ==
- Clute, John and Peter Nicholls. The Encyclopedia of Science Fiction. New York: St. Martin's Griffin, 1993 (2nd edition 1995). ISBN 0-312-13486-X.
