= John T. Phillifent =

English science fiction author

- Born: 10 November 1916; Durham, England
- Died: 15 December 1976 (aged 60); London, England
- Occupation: Author
- Writing career
- Genre: Science fiction

John Thomas Phillifent (10 November 1916 – 15 December 1976) was an English electrical engineer and author of science fiction and fantasy. He wrote as John T. Phillifent and under the pen name John Rackham. Most of his work was published as by Rackham, the main exceptions being three novels related to The Man from U.N.C.L.E. series, his short stories published in the magazine Analog, and a number of late novels. Most of his novels were issued together with the works of other authors as Ace Doubles.

== Rackham's Law ==
American author Frederik Pohl credits Phillifent with a comprehensive definition of science fiction that he dubs "Rackham's Law". According to Pohl, Phillifent's opinion of "the diagnostic cut ... between science fiction and all other forms of writing" was that science fiction "was unique in that it was invariably written by 'the science-fiction method' analogous to the 'scientific method' which ... underpins all science." Pohl's own description of "the science-fiction method" (which Phillifent himself never troubled to define) is that "it consists in looking at the world around us, dissecting it into its component parts, throwing some of those parts away and replacing them with invented new ones - and then reassembling that new world and describing what might happen in it. And I think that every SF writer who ever lived has used precisely that method."

== Bibliography ==
=== The Man From U.N.C.L.E. ===
- The Mad Scientist Affair (1966)
- The Corfu Affair (1967)
- The Power Cube Affair (1968)

=== Space Puppet series ===
- Space Puppet (1954) (as John Rackham)
- Jupiter Equilateral (1954) (as John Rackham)
- The Master Weed (1954) (as John Rackham)
- Alien Virus (1955) (as John Rackham)

=== Chappie Jones series ===
- "The Black Cat's Paw" (1960) (as John Rackham)
- "Ankh" (1961) (as John Rackham)
- "The Veil of Isis" (1961) (as John Rackham)
- The Touch of Evil (1963) (collection) (as John Rackham)

=== Other novels ===
- Watch on Peter (1964) (as John Rackham)
- We, the Venusians (1965) (as John Rackham)
- Danger From Vega (1966) (as John Rackham)
- The Beasts of Kohl (1966) (as John Rackham)
- Time To Live (1966) (as John Rackham)
- The Double Invaders (1967) (as John Rackham)
- Alien Sea (1968) (as John Rackham)
- The Proxima Project (1968) (as John Rackham)
- Ipomoea (1969) (as John Rackham)
- Treasure of Tau Ceti (1969) (as John Rackham)
- The Anything Tree (1970) (as John Rackham)
- Flower of Doradil (1970) (as John Rackham)
- Beyond Capella (1971) (as John Rackham)
- Dark Planet (1971) (as John Rackham)
- Earthstrings (1972) (as John Rackham)
- Genius Unlimited (1972)
- Beanstalk (1973) (as John Rackham)
- Hierarchies (1973)
- King of Argent (1973)
- Life with Lancelot (1973) expanded from "The Stainless-Steel Knight" (1961, as Rackham)

=== Other short stories ===
- "Drog" (1958) (as John Rackham)
- "One-Eye" (1958) (as John Rackham)
- "Cadet" (1959) (as John Rackham)
- "Curse Strings" (1959) (as John Rackham)
- "If You Wish" (1959) (as John Rackham)
- "Nulook" (1959) (as John Rackham)
- "Idea Man" (1960) (as John Rackham)
- "Point" (1961)
- "The Stainless-Steel Knight" (1961) (as John Rackham) expanded to Life with Lancelot (1973, as Phillifent)
- "The Trouble with Honey" (1961) (as John Rackham)
- "Ethical Quotient" (1962)
- "Fire and Ice" (1962) (as John Rackham)
- "Dr. Jeckers and Mr. Hyde" (1963) (as John Rackham)
- "The Last Salamander" (1963) (as John Rackham)
- "What You Don't Know" (1963) (as John Rackham)
- "With Clean Hands" (1963) (as John Rackham)
- "Flying Fish" (1964)
- "God Killer" (1964) (as John Rackham)
- "Hell-Planet" (1964) (as John Rackham)
- "Room with a Skew" (1964) (as John Rackham)
- "Advantage" (1965) (as John Rackham)
- "Bring Back a Life" (1965) (as John Rackham)
- "Finnegan's Knack" (1965)
- "A Way with Animals" (1965) (as John Rackham)
- "Computer's Mate" (1966) (as John Rackham)
- "The God-Birds of Glentallach" (1966) (as John Rackham)
- "Poseidon Project" (1966) (as John Rackham)
- "Aim For the Heel" (1967)
- "Catharsis" (1968) (as John Rackham)
- "The Divided House" (1968) (as John Rackham)
- "Incorrigible" (1968)
- "The Rites of Man" (1968)
- "All Fall Down" (1969)
- "The Fine Print" (1971)
- "Stoop to Conquer" (1971) (as John Rackham)
- "Wise Child" (1973) (as John Rackham)
- "Owe Me" (1974)
- "The Halted Village" (1975) (as John Rackham)
- "Heal Thyself" (1975) (as John Rackham)

=== Nonfiction ===
- "That Moon Plaque (Men on the Moon)" (1969)

== General references ==
- John T. Phillifent at the Internet Speculative Fiction Database
