= Sidgwick & Jackson =

British publisher

- Parent company: Pan Macmillan
- Founded: 1908
- Country of origin: United Kingdom
- Headquarters location: London
- Distribution: Macmillan Distribution (UK); Trafalgar Square Publishing (United States)
- Publication types: Books
- Official website: http://www.panmacmillan.com

Sidgwick & Jackson was an imprint of book publishing company Pan Macmillan. Formerly it was an independent publisher; as such, it was founded in Britain in 1908 by Frank Sidgwick (1879–1939) as chairman of directors and Robert Cameron Jackson (1882–1917) as company secretary. The firm was funded by Lord Forte.

It was best known as a publisher of literary fiction and some academic non-fiction. Early authors included poet Rupert Brooke and novelist E.M. Forster. In more recent times it helped launch the careers of Lynda La Plante, Shirley Conran and Judith Krantz.

Pan Macmillan acquired the company from Trusthouse Forte in the mid-1980s. It was dissolved in 2015.

The managing director from 1968 to 1995 was William Armstrong; the company and Armstrong were said to have encouraged individuality and entrepreneurship among staff. Armstrong was also the father of the singer Dido.

Their archives from 1903 to 1966 are held by the Bodleian Library, Oxford.
