= Colin Kapp =

British science fiction author

Derek Ivor Colin Kapp (3 April 1928 – 3 August 2007), known also as Colin Kapp, was a British science fiction author known best for his stories about the Unorthodox Engineers.

He was born in Southwark, south London, 3 April 1928 to John L. F. Kapp and Annie M.A. (née Towner).

As an electronic engineer, he began his career with Mullard Electronics then specialised in electroplating techniques, eventually becoming a freelance consultant engineer.

== Works ==
=== Cageworld series ===
1. Search for the sun! (1982) (also published as Cageworld)
2. The Lost worlds of Cronus (1982)
3. The Tyrant of Hades (1984)
4. Star Search (1984)

=== Chaos series ===
- The Patterns of Chaos (1972)
- The Chaos Weapon (1977)

=== Standalone novels ===
- The Dark Mind (1964) (also published as Transfinite Man)
- The Wizard of Anharitte (1973)
- The Survival Game (1976)
- Manalone (1977)
- The Ion War (1978)
- The Timewinders (unpublished). The novel was advertised for publication in 1980 but never appeared.

=== Short stories ===
==== Unorthodox Engineers ====
- "The Railways Up On Cannis" (1959)
- "The Subways of Tazoo" (1964)
- "The Pen and the Dark" (1966)
- "Getaway from Getawehi" (1969)
- "The Black Hole of Negrav" (1975)

Collected in The Unorthodox Engineers (1979)

==== Other stories ====
- "Breaking Point" (1959)
- "Survival Problem" (1959)
- "Lambda I" (1962)
- "The Night-Flame" (1964)
- "Hunger Over Sweet Waters" (1965)
- "Ambassador to Verdammt" (1967)
- "The Imagination Trap" (1967)
- "The Cloudbuilders" (1968)
- "I Bring You Hands" (1968)
- "Gottlos" (1969), notable for having (along with Keith Laumer's Bolo series) inspired Steve Jackson's classic game of 21st century tank warfare Ogre.
- "The Teacher" (1969)
- "Letter from an Unknown Genius" (1971)
- "What the Thunder Said" (1972)
- "Which Way Do I Go For Jericho?" (1972)
- "The Old King's Answers" (1973)
- "Crimescan" (1973)
- "What The Thunder Said" (1973)
- "Mephisto and the Ion Explorer" (1974)
- "War of the Wastelife" (1974)
- "Cassius and the Mind-Jaunt" (1975)
- "Something in the City" (1984)
- "An Alternative to Salt" (1986)
