= Dennis Dobson =

British book publisher (1919–1978)

- Born: 1919
- Died: 1978 (aged 59)
- Occupation: Book publisher
- Known for: Founder of Dobson Books
- Spouse: Margaret Green (m. 1953)

Dennis Dobson (1919 – 1978) was a British book publisher who was the eponymous founder of a small but respected company in London.

== Background ==
Set up in 1944 and run from his house at 80 Kensington Church Street, Dobson Books is variously described as having been "diverse, original, and occasionally successful", "notable and pioneering" "left-wing" and a "very literary but somewhat idiosyncratic firm". The publishing house became renowned for its musicology list, and also published fiction (some in translation) including a strong science fiction list, as well as books imported from the United States.

Among the diverse list of authors published by Dobson were Irving Adler, Isaac Asimov, Robert Benchley, John W. Campbell, John Christopher, Avril Coleridge-Taylor, Ivor Cutler, Norman Demuth, Wallace Fowlie, John Glashan, Albert Gleizes, Nicholas Stuart Gray, Joseph L. Green, Gerard Hoffnung, Eric Hope, F. W. Harvey, Lillian Rosanoff Lieber, Margaret Mahy, Menon Marath, Spike Milligan, Marcello Minale, Carl Nielsen, Wilfrid Noyce, Frederik Pohl, Francis Poulenc, George Padmore, Ian Parrott, Eric Frank Russell, Jean Marie Stine, Marie Seton, Katherine Binney Shippen, Nigel Tranter, Jack Vance, Ricardo Viñes, Peter Warlock, Richard Wright, and others.

== Personal life ==
In 1953, Dobson married Margaret Green (1928–2014), whose first job had been as his secretary, and they had four sons and three daughters. Dobson died in 1978 aged 59, after suffering a brain haemorrhage on the train returning from the Frankfurt Book Fair. After his death, the publishing company was wound down and his widow bought and restored Brancepeth Castle.
