= Transworld (publisher) =

British publishing house

- Parent company: Penguin Random House
- Founded: 1950; 76 years ago
- Country of origin: United Kingdom
- Headquarters location: Ealing, London, England
- Publication types: Books
- Imprints: Bantam, Bantam Press, Black Swan, Corgi, Doubleday, Wayward TxF
- Official website: www.penguin.co.uk/company/publishers/transworld.html

Transworld is a British publishing division of Penguin Random House located in Ealing. It was established in 1950 as the British division of American company Bantam Books. It publishes fiction and nonfiction titles by various best-selling authors including Val Wood under several different imprints. Hardbacks are published under the Doubleday imprint, whereas paperbacks are published under the Black Swan or Corgi imprints. The Bantam Press imprint publishes both hardbacks and prestige softcovers.

== Terry Pratchett First Novel Award ==
Transworld sponsors the Terry Pratchett First Novel Award for unpublished science-fiction novels.

== Publications ==
- Fata Morgana (1977), written by William Kotzwinkle, illustrated by Wayne Anderson

== See also ==
- List of largest UK book publishers
