= John Carnell =

British science fiction editor (1912–1972)

- Born: Edward John Carnell; 8 April 1912; United Kingdom
- Died: 23 March 1972 (aged 59); United Kingdom
- Occupation: Editor

Edward John Carnell (8 April 1912 – 23 March 1972) was a British science fiction editor known for editing New Worlds in 1946 then from 1949 to 1963. He also edited Science Fantasy from the 1950s. After the magazines were sold to another publisher he left to launch the New Writings in SF anthology series, editing 21 issues until his death, after which the series was continued by Kenneth Bulmer for a further 9 issues.

Taken together his publications played a role in starting the careers of Damien Broderick, Brian W. Aldiss, James White, J. G. Ballard, and his successor at New Worlds, Michael Moorcock. Despite that list, Carnell tended to prefer adventure and Hard SF to New Wave experimentation so John Christopher, Kenneth Bulmer, and E. C. Tubb were more typical of his tenure. However, he was not seen as an opponent of the New Wave in the way John W. Campbell tended to be, and he even published a number of more experimental works by such authors as J. G. Ballard and Brian Aldiss. He was also the first to publish a story by the then fifteen-year-old Terry Pratchett.

== Anthologies ==
- Jinn and Jitters (1946)
- No Place Like Earth (1952, T. V. Boardman, ASIN B0000CIDM1)
- Gateway to Tomorrow (1954)
- The Best From New Worlds Science Fiction (1955)
- Gateway to the Stars (1955)
- Lambda 1 & Other Stories (1964)
- New Writings in SF Anthology series, parts 1–21 - edited from 1964 to 1972
- Weird Shadows From Beyond (1965)
