= 1972 in science fiction =

The year 1972 was marked, in science fiction, by the following:

== Events ==
- The 30th annual Worldcon, L.A.Con I, is held in Los Angeles, USA
- The first Eurocon is held in Trieste, Italy

== Births and deaths ==
=== Births ===
- N. K. Jemisin
- China Miéville
- Adrian Tchaikovsky
- Andy Weir

=== Deaths ===
- Fredric Brown

== Literary releases ==
=== Novels ===
- Roadside Picnic, by Arkady and Boris Strugatsky
- The Terminal Man by Michael Crichton

=== Short stories ===
==== Short story anthologies ====
- The first volume of The Best Science Fiction of the Year is published by Ballantine Books, edited by Terry Carr
- The first volume of The Annual World's Best SF is published by DAW Books, edited by Donald A. Wollheim and Arthur W. Saha

=== Comics ===
- Kamandi #1, by Jack Kirby
- Mazinger Z begins serialization in Weekly Shōnen Jump magazine

== Movies ==
- Silent Running, dir. by Thomas Trumbull
- Slaughterhouse-Five, dir. by George Roy Hill
- Solaris, dir. by Andrei Tarkovsky
- Z.P.G., dir. by Michael Campus

== Awards ==
=== Hugos ===
- Best novel: To Your Scattered Bodies Go, by Philip José Farmer
- Best novella: The Queen of Air and Darkness, by Poul Anderson
- Best short story:"Inconstant Moon", by Larry Niven
- Best dramatic presentation: A Clockwork Orange, dir. by Stanley Kubrick; screenplay by Stanley Kubrick; based on the novel by Anthony Burgess
- Best professional magazine: The Magazine of Fantasy and Science Fiction, ed. by Edward L. Ferman
- Best professional artist:Frank Kelly Freas
- Best fanzine: Locus, ed. by Charles N. Brown and Dena Brown
- Best fan writer:Harry Warner Jr.
- Best fan artist:Tim Kirk

=== Nebulas ===
- Best novel: The Gods Themselves, by Isaac Asimov
- Best novella: A Meeting with Medusa, by Arthur C. Clarke
- Best novelette: "Goat Song" by Poul Anderson
- Best short story: "When It Changed" by Joanna Russ

=== Other awards ===
- Saturn Award for Best Science Fiction Film: Slaughterhouse-Five
