= The Annual World's Best SF =

1972-90 annual anthology series by Donald A. Wollheim and Arthur W. Saha

The 1972 Annual World's Best SF edited by Donald A. Wollheim and Arthur W. Saha, DAW Books, 1972, cover art by John Schoenherr.

The Annual World's Best SF was a series of annual paperback anthologies published by American company DAW Books from 1972 to 1990 under the editorship of publisher Donald A. Wollheim and Arthur W. Saha from 1972 to 1990. Some volumes were also issued in hardcover through the Science Fiction Book Club. It was a continuation of the earlier anthology series World's Best Science Fiction, edited by Wollheim and Terry Carr, published from 1965 to 1971 by Ace Books (Carr also issued his own separate continuation, The Best Science Fiction of the Year, from 1972 to 1987.) DAW also issued the companion series The Year's Best Horror Stories from 1971 to 1994, and The Year's Best Fantasy Stories from 1975 to 1988.

Each volume carried the year of publication in the title between the first and second recurring words. The first nine volumes were subsequently reprinted under the title Wollheim's World's Best SF, distinguished from each other numerically, without the year designation. The third through seventh volumes were also reprinted in hardcover in the United Kingdom, the third and fourth as The World's Best SF Short Stories, nos. 1-2, published by The Elmfield Press, and the fifth through seventh as The World's Best SF, nos. 3-5, published by Dennis Dobson.

Each annual volume reprinted what in the opinion of the editors were the best science fiction short stories appearing in the previous year. The series also aimed to discover and nurture new talent. It featured both occasionally recurring authors, and writers new to the science fiction genre.

== The series ==
1. The 1972 Annual World's Best SF (1972) = Wollheim's World's Best SF: Series One (1977)
2. The 1973 Annual World's Best SF (1973) = Wollheim's World's Best SF: Series Two (1978)
3. The 1974 Annual World's Best SF (1974) = Wollheim's World's Best SF: Series Three (1979)
4. The 1975 Annual World's Best SF (1975) = Wollheim's World's Best SF: Series Four (1980)
5. The 1976 Annual World's Best SF (1976) = Wollheim's World's Best SF: Series Five (1981)
6. The 1977 Annual World's Best SF (1977) = Wollheim's World's Best SF: Series Six (1982)
7. The 1978 Annual World's Best SF (1978) = Wollheim's World's Best SF: Series Seven (1983)
8. The 1979 Annual World's Best SF (1979) = Wollheim's World's Best SF: Series Eight (1984)
9. The 1980 Annual World's Best SF (1980) = Wollheim's World's Best SF: Series Nine (1985)
10. The 1981 Annual World's Best SF (1981)
11. The 1982 Annual World's Best SF (1982)
12. The 1983 Annual World's Best SF (1983)
13. The 1984 Annual World's Best SF (1984)
14. The 1985 Annual World's Best SF (1985)
15. The 1986 Annual World's Best SF (1986)
16. The 1987 Annual World's Best SF (1987)
17. The 1988 Annual World's Best SF (1988)
18. The 1989 Annual World's Best SF (1989)
19. The 1990 Annual World's Best SF (1990)
