= The Year's Best Fantasy Stories: 6 =

1980 anthology edited by Lin Carter

- Cover art from the first edition
- Editor: Lin Carter
- Cover artist: Josh Kirby
- Language: English
- Series: The Year's Best Fantasy Stories
- Genre: Fantasy
- Publisher: DAW Books
- Publication date: 1980
- Publication place: United States
- Media type: Print (paperback)
- Pages: 191
- ISBN: 0-87997-578-4
- Preceded by: The Year's Best Fantasy Stories: 5
- Followed by: The Year's Best Fantasy Stories: 7

The Year's Best Fantasy Stories: 6 is an anthology of fantasy stories, edited by American writer Lin Carter. It was first published in paperback by DAW Books in November 1980. Despite the anthology's title, it gathers together pieces originally published during a four-year period, 1977 to 1980, with the preponderance of them from 1979.

== Summary ==
The book collects eleven novelettes and short stories by various fantasy authors, deemed by the editor the best from the period represented, together with an introductory survey of the year in fantasy, an essay on the year's best fantasy books, and introductory notes to the individual stories by the editor. The pieces include a pseudonymous work (the story by "Grail Undwin", actually by Carter).

== Contents ==
- "The Year in Fantasy" (Lin Carter)
- "Garden of Blood" (Roger Zelazny)
- "The Character Assassin" (Paul H. Cook)
- "The Things That Are Gods" (John Brunner)
- "Zurvan's Saint" (Grail Undwin)
- "Perfidious Amber" (Tanith Lee)
- "The Mer She" (Fritz Leiber)
- "Demon of the Snows" (Lin Carter)
- "The Pavilion Where All Times Meet" (Jayge Carr)
- "Cryptically Yours" (Brian Lumley)
- "Red as Blood" (Tanith Lee)
- "Sandmagic" (Orson Scott Card)
- "The Year's Best Fantasy Books" (Lin Carter)

== Reception ==
The anthology was reviewed by Douglas E. Winter in Fantasy Newsletter no. 31, December 1980.
