= The 1975 Annual World's Best SF =

1975 anthology edited by Donald A. Wollheim and Arthur W. Saha

- Cover of first edition, 1975
- Editors: Donald A. Wollheim and Arthur W. Saha
- Cover artist: Jack Gaughan
- Language: English
- Series: The Annual World’s Best SF
- Genre: Science fiction
- Publisher: DAW Books
- Publication date: 1975
- Publication place: United States
- Media type: Print (paperback)
- Pages: 269
- Preceded by: The 1974 Annual World's Best SF
- Followed by: The 1976 Annual World's Best SF

The 1975 Annual World's Best SF is an anthology of science fiction short stories edited by Donald A. Wollheim and Arthur W. Saha, the fourth volume in a series of nineteen.

The 1975 Annual World's Best SF was first published in paperback by DAW Books in May 1975, followed by a hardcover edition issued in September of the same year by the same publisher as a selection of the Science Fiction Book Club. For the hardcover edition the original cover art of Jack Gaughan was replaced by a new cover painting by Richard V. Corben. The paperback edition was reissued by DAW in December 1980 under the variant title Wollheim's World's Best SF: Series Four, this time with cover art by Vicente Segrelles. A British hardcover edition was published by The Elmfield Press in November 1976 under the variant title The World's Best SF Short Stories No. 2.

The book collects ten novellas, novelettes and short stories by various science fiction authors, with an introduction by Wollheim. The stories were previously published in 1974 in the magazines Analog, Galaxy, Amazing Science Fiction, The Magazine of Fantasy & Science Fiction, and Worlds of If, and the anthology Stellar 1.

== Contents ==
- "Introduction" (Donald A. Wollheim)
- "A Song for Lya" (George R. R. Martin)
- "Deathsong" (Sydney J. Van Scyoc)
- "A Full Member of the Club" (Bob Shaw)
- "The Sun's Tears" (Brian M. Stableford)
- "The Gift of Garigolli" (C. M. Kornbluth and Frederik Pohl)
- "The Four-Hour Fugue" (Alfred Bester)
- "Twig" (Gordon R. Dickson)
- "Cathadonian Odyssey" (Michael Bishop)
- "The Bleeding Man" (Craig Strete)
- "Stranger in Paradise" (Isaac Asimov)

== Awards ==
The anthology placed seventh in the 1976 Locus Poll Award for Best Anthology.

"A Song for Lya" was nominated for the 1974 Nebula Award for Best Novella, won the 1975 Hugo Award for Best Novella, and placed second in the 1975 Locus Poll Award for Best Novella.

"The Gift of Garigolli" placed fifteenth in the 1975 Locus Poll Award for Best Novelette.

"The Four-Hour Fugue" was nominated for the 1975 Hugo Award for Best Short Story and placed sixth in the 1975 Locus Poll Award for Best Short Story.

"Twig" placed sixth in the 1975 Locus Poll Award for Best Novelette.

"Cathadonian Odyssey" was nominated for the 1975 Hugo Award for Best Short Story and placed seventh in the 1975 Locus Poll Award for Best Short Story.

"The Bleeding Man" was nominated for the 1975 Nebula Award for Best Novelette.
