= The 1977 Annual World's Best SF =

1977 anthology edited by Donald A. Wollheim and Arthur W. Saha

- Cover of first edition, 1977
- Editors: Donald A. Wollheim and Arthur W. Saha
- Cover artist: Jack Gaughan
- Language: English
- Series: The Annual World’s Best SF
- Genre: Science fiction
- Publisher: DAW Books
- Publication date: 1977
- Publication place: United States
- Media type: Print (paperback)
- Pages: 280
- Preceded by: The 1976 Annual World's Best SF
- Followed by: The 1978 Annual World's Best SF

The 1977 Annual World's Best SF is an anthology of science fiction short stories edited by Donald A. Wollheim and Arthur W. Saha, the sixth volume in a series of nineteen. It was first published in paperback by DAW Books in May 1977, followed by a hardcover edition issued in September of the same year by the same publisher as a selection of the Science Fiction Book Club. For the hardcover edition the original cover art of Jack Gaughan was replaced by a new cover painting by Richard V. Corben. The paperback edition was reissued by DAW in 1983 under the variant title Wollheim's World's Best SF: Series Six, this time with cover art by Bernal. A British hardcover edition was published by Dennis Dobson in November 1979 under the variant title The World's Best SF 4.

The book collects ten novellas, novelettes and short stories by various science fiction authors, with an introduction by Wollheim. The stories were previously published in 1976 in the magazines Galaxy, The Magazine of Fantasy & Science Fiction, and Amazing Science Fiction, the anthologies Andromeda 1, Stellar No 2, New Worlds 10, and Aurora: Beyond Equality, and the collection The Custodians and Other Stories.

== Contents ==
- "Introduction" (Donald A. Wollheim)
- "Appearance of Life" (Brian W. Aldiss)
- "Overdrawn at the Memory Bank" (John Varley)
- "Those Good Old Days of Liquid Fuel" (Michael G. Coney)
- "The Hertford Manuscript" (Richard Cowper)
- "Natural Advantage" (Lester del Rey)
- "The Bicentennial Man" (Isaac Asimov)
- "The Cabinet of Oliver Naylor" (Barrington J. Bayley)
- "My Boat" (Joanna Russ)
- "Houston, Houston, Do You Read?" (James Tiptree, Jr.)
- "I See You" (Damon Knight)

== Awards ==
"Appearance of Life" placed tenth in the 1977 Locus Poll Award for Best Short Story.

"Overdrawn at the Memory Bank" placed tenth in the 1977 Locus Poll Award for Best Novelette.

"The Hertford Manuscript" placed fifth in the 1977 Locus Poll Award for Best Novelette.

"The Bicentennial Man" won the 1976 Nebula Award for Best Novelette and the 1977 Hugo Award for Best Novelette, and placed first in the 1977 Locus Poll Award for Best Novelette.

"Houston, Houston, Do You Read?" won the 1976 Nebula Award for Best Novella and the 1977 Hugo Award for Best Novella, and placed third in the 1977 Locus Poll Award for Best Novella.

"I See You" was nominated for the 1977 Hugo Award for Best Short Story and placed second in the 1977 Locus Poll Award for Best Short Story.
