= The 1978 Annual World's Best SF =

1978 anthology edited by Donald A. Wollheim and Arthur W. Saha

- Cover of first edition, 1978
- Editors: Donald A. Wollheim and Arthur W. Saha
- Cover artist: Jack Gaughan
- Series: The Annual World’s Best SF
- Genre: Science fiction
- Publisher: DAW Books
- Publication date: 1978
- Publication place: United States
- Media type: Print (paperback)
- Pages: 270
- ISBN: 0-87997-376-5
- Preceded by: The 1977 Annual World's Best SF
- Followed by: The 1979 Annual World's Best SF

The 1978 Annual World's Best SF is an anthology of science fiction short stories edited by Donald A. Wollheim and Arthur W. Saha, the seventh volume in a series of nineteen. It was first published in paperback by DAW Books in May 1978, followed by a hardcover edition issued in August of the same year by the same publisher as a selection of the Science Fiction Book Club. For the hardcover edition the original cover art of Jack Gaughan was replaced by a new cover painting by Richard Powers. The paperback edition was reissued by DAW in 1983 under the variant title Wollheim's World's Best SF: Series Seven, this time with cover art by Graham Wildridge. A British hardcover edition was published by Dennis Dobson in May 1980 under the variant title The World's Best SF 5.

The book collects ten novellas, novelettes and short stories by various science fiction authors, with an introduction by Wollheim. The stories were previously published in 1977 in the magazines The Magazine of Fantasy & Science Fiction, Analog Science Fiction/Science Fact, and Cosmos Science Fiction and Fantasy.

== Contents ==
- "Introduction" (Donald A. Wollheim)
- "In the Hall of the Martian Kings" (John Varley) (Originally published in 1976)
- "A Time to Live" (Joe Haldeman)
- "The House of Compassionate Sharers" (Michael Bishop)
- "Particle Theory" (Edward Bryant)
- "The Taste of the Dish and the Savor of the Day" (John Brunner)
- "Jeffty Is Five" (Harlan Ellison)
- "The Screwfly Solution" (Raccoona Sheldon)
- "Eyes of Amber" (Joan D. Vinge)
- "Child of the Sun" (James E. Gunn)
- "Brother" (Clifford D. Simak)

== Awards ==
"In the Hall of the Martian Kings" was nominated for the 1978 Ditmar Award for Best International Long Fiction and the 1978 Hugo Award for Best Novella, and placed sixth in the 1978 Locus Poll Award for Best Novella.

"The House of Compassionate Sharers" was nominated for the 1978 Ditmar Award for Best International Long Fiction and placed twelfth in the 1978 Locus Poll Award for Best Short Fiction.

"Particle Theory" was nominated for the 1977 Nebula Award for Best Novelette and placed eighth in the 1978 Locus Poll Award for Best Short Fiction.

"Jeffty is Five" won the 1977 Nebula Award for Best Short Story, the 1978 Hugo Award for Best Short Story, and the 1979 British Fantasy Award for Best Short Story, placed first in the 1978 Locus Poll Award for Best Short Fiction, and was nominated for the 1978 World Fantasy Award for Best Short Fiction and the 1979 Balrog Award.

"Eyes of Amber" won the 1978 Hugo Award for Best Novelette and placed fifth in the 1978 Locus Poll Award for Best Short Fiction.
