= The 1982 Annual World's Best SF =

1982 anthology edited by Donald A. Wollheim and Arthur W. Saha

- Cover of first edition, 1982
- Editors: Donald A. Wollheim and Arthur W. Saha
- Cover artist: Wayne D. Barlowe
- Language: English
- Series: The Annual World’s Best SF
- Genre: Science fiction
- Publisher: DAW Books
- Publication date: 1982
- Publication place: United States
- Media type: Print (paperback)
- Pages: 304
- ISBN: 0-87997-728-0
- Preceded by: The 1981 Annual World's Best SF
- Followed by: The 1983 Annual World's Best SF

The 1982 Annual World's Best SF is an anthology of science fiction short stories edited by Donald A. Wollheim and Arthur W. Saha, the eleventh volume in a series of nineteen. It was first published in paperback by DAW Books in May 1982, followed by a hardcover edition issued in September of the same year by the same publisher as a selection of the Science Fiction Book Club. For the hardcover edition the original cover art of Wayne D. Barlowe was replaced by a new cover painting by Dawn Wilson.

The book collects ten novellas, novelettes and short stories by various science fiction authors, with an introduction by Wollheim. The stories were previously published in 1981 in the magazines Omni, The Magazine of Fantasy & Science Fiction, Analog Science Fiction/Science Fact, and Isaac Asimov's Science Fiction Magazine, the collections Sunfall and Out of the Everywhere and Other Extraordinary Visions, and the anthology Distant Worlds.

== Contents ==
- "Introduction" (Donald A. Wollheim)
- "Blind Spot" (Jayge Carr)
- "Highliner" (C. J. Cherryh)
- "The Pusher" (John Varley)
- "Polyphemus" (Michael Shea)
- "Absent Thee from Felicity Awhile . . ." (Somtow Sucharitkul)
- "Out of the Everywhere" (James Tiptree, Jr.)
- "Slac//" (Michael P. Kube-McDowell)
- "The Cyphertone" (S. C. Sykes)
- "Through All Your Houses Wandering" (Ted Reynolds)
- "The Last Day of Christmas" (David J. Lake)

== Awards ==
"Blind Spot" placed twenty-fourth in the 1982 Locus Poll Award for Best Novelette.

"The Pusher" was nominated for the 1981 Nebula Award for Best Short Story, won the 1982 SF Chronicle Award for Best Short Story and the 1982 Hugo Award for Best Short Story, and placed first in the 1982 Locus Poll Award for Best Short Story.

"Polyphemus" placed sixth in the 1982 Locus Poll Award for Best Short Story.

"Out of the Everywhere" placed fifth in the 1982 Locus Poll Award for Best Novelette.

"Through All Your Houses Wandering" placed eighteenth in the 1982 Locus Poll Award for Best Novella.
