= The Year's Best Fantasy Stories (series) =

Annual anthology series by DAW Books

The Year's Best Fantasy Stories: 2 edited by Lin Carter, DAW Books, 1976, cover art by George Barr.

The Year’s Best Fantasy Stories was a series of annual anthologies published by DAW Books from 1975 to 1988 under the successive editorships of Lin Carter from 1975 to 1980 and Arthur W. Saha from 1981 to 1988. The series was a companion to DAW’s The Annual World’s Best SF, issued from 1972 to 1990 under the editorship of Saha with publisher Donald A. Wollheim, and The Year's Best Horror Stories, issued from 1971 to 1994, which performed a similar office for the science fiction and horror fiction genres.

== Summary ==
Each annual volume reprinted what in the opinion of the editor was the best fantasy literature short fiction appearing in the previous year. Carter's picks tended to be idiosyncratic, concentrating on long-established authors in the field and reflecting his own particular enthusiasms. He also habitually padded out the volumes he edited with his own works, whether written singly, in collaboration, or under pseudonyms. Saha’s editorial choices more closely reflected the contemporary field and highlighted more emerging authors.

Under Carter's editorship surveys of "The Year’s Best Fantasy Books" and "The Year in Fantasy" rounded out each year’s collection, continuing the annual surveys of the year's best fantasy fiction he had formerly contributed to Castle of Frankenstein before that magazine's 1975 demise. Saha contented himself with a general introduction.

== The series ==
1. The Year's Best Fantasy Stories, Lin Carter, ed. (1975)
2. The Year's Best Fantasy Stories: 2, Lin Carter, ed. (1976)
3. The Year's Best Fantasy Stories: 3, Lin Carter, ed. (1977)
4. The Year's Best Fantasy Stories: 4, Lin Carter, ed. (1978)
5. The Year's Best Fantasy Stories: 5, Lin Carter, ed. (1980)
6. The Year's Best Fantasy Stories: 6, Lin Carter, ed. (1980)
7. The Year's Best Fantasy Stories: 7, Arthur W. Saha, ed. (1981)
8. The Year's Best Fantasy Stories: 8, Arthur W. Saha, ed. (1982)
9. The Year's Best Fantasy Stories: 9, Arthur W. Saha, ed. (1983)
10. The Year's Best Fantasy Stories: 10, Arthur W. Saha, ed. (1984)
11. The Year's Best Fantasy Stories: 11, Arthur W. Saha, ed. (1985)
12. The Year's Best Fantasy Stories: 12, Arthur W. Saha, ed. (1986)
13. The Year's Best Fantasy Stories: 13, Arthur W. Saha, ed. (1987)
14. The Year's Best Fantasy Stories: 14, Arthur W. Saha, ed. (1988)
