= The 1973 Annual World's Best SF =

1973 anthology edited by Donald A. Wollheim and Arthur W. Saha

- Cover of first edition, 1973
- Editors: Donald A. Wollheim and Arthur W. Saha
- Cover artist: Jack Gaughan
- Language: English
- Series: The Annual World’s Best SF
- Genre: Science fiction
- Publisher: DAW Books
- Publication date: 1973
- Publication place: United States
- Media type: Print (paperback)
- Pages: 253
- Preceded by: The 1972 Annual World's Best SF
- Followed by: The 1974 Annual World's Best SF

The 1973 Annual World's Best SF is an anthology of science fiction short stories edited by Donald A. Wollheim and Arthur W. Saha, the second volume in a series of nineteen. It was first published in paperback by DAW Books in May 1973, followed by a hardcover edition issued in August of the same year by the same publisher as a selection of the Science Fiction Book Club. For the hardcover edition the original cover art of Jack Gaughan was replaced by a new cover painting by William S. Shields. The paperback edition was reissued by DAW in December 1978 under the variant title Wollheim's World's Best SF: Series Two, this time with cover art by Larry Oritz.

The book collects ten novelettes and short stories by various science fiction authors, with an introduction by Wollheim. Most of the stories were previously published in 1972 in the magazines The Magazine of Fantasy & Science Fiction, Amazing Science Fiction, Analog, and Galaxy Magazine, and the anthologies New Writings in SF 20 and Infinity Three. One story was first published in this anthology.

== Contents ==
- "Introduction" (Donald A. Wollheim)
- "Goat Song" (Poul Anderson)
- "The Man Who Walked Home" (James Tiptree, Jr.)
- "Oh, Valinda!" (Michael G. Coney)
- "The Gold at the Starbow's End" (Frederik Pohl)
- "To Walk a City's Street" (Clifford D. Simak)
- "Rorqual Maru" (T. J. Bass)
- "Changing Woman" (W. Macfarlane)
- "'Willie's Blues'" (Robert J. Tilley)
- "Long Shot" (Vernor Vinge)
- "Thus Love Betrays Us" (Phyllis MacLennon)

== Awards ==
The anthology placed third in the 1974 Locus Poll Award for Best Reprint Anthology/Collection.

"Goat Song" won the 1972 Nebula Award for Best Novella and the 1973 Hugo Award for Best Novella, and placed third in the Locus Poll Award for Best Short Fiction.

"The Gold at the Starbow's End" was nominated for the 1972 Nebula Award for Best Novella and the 1973 Hugo Award for Best Novella, and won the Locus Poll Award for Best Novella.
