= The 1980 Annual World's Best SF =

1980 anthology edited by Donald A. Wollheim and Arthur W. Saha

- Cover of first edition, 1980
- Editors: Donald A. Wollheim and Arthur W. Saha
- Cover artist: Jack Gaughan
- Language: English
- Series: The Annual World’s Best SF
- Genre: Science fiction
- Publisher: DAW Books
- Publication date: 1980
- Publication place: United States
- Media type: Print (paperback)
- Pages: 284
- ISBN: 0-87997-535-0
- Preceded by: The 1979 Annual World's Best SF
- Followed by: The 1981 Annual World's Best SF

The 1980 Annual World's Best SF is an anthology of science fiction short stories edited by Donald A. Wollheim and Arthur W. Saha, the ninth volume in a series of nineteen. It was first published in paperback by DAW Books in May 1980, followed by a hardcover edition issued in September of the same year by the same publisher as a selection of the Science Fiction Book Club. For the hardcover edition the original cover art of Jack Gaughan was replaced by a new cover painting by Gary Viskupik. The paperback edition was later reissued by DAW under the variant title Wollheim's World's Best SF: Series Nine.

The book collects eleven novellas, novelettes and short stories by various science fiction authors, with an introduction by Wollheim. The stories were previously published in 1979 in the magazines Omni, Analog Science Fiction/Science Fact, Destinies, Galileo, Isaac Asimov's Science Fiction Magazine, and The Magazine of Fantasy & Science Fiction, and the anthology Universe 9.

== Contents ==
- "Introduction" (Donald A. Wollheim)
- "The Way of Cross and Dragon" (George R. R. Martin)
- "The Thirteenth Utopia" (Somtow Sucharitkul)
- "Options" (John Varley)
- "Unaccompanied Sonata" (Orson Scott Card)
- "The Story Writer" (Richard Wilson)
- "Daisy, in the Sun" (Connie Willis)
- "The Locusts" (Larry Niven and Steven Barnes)
- "The Thaw" (Tanith Lee)
- "Out There Where the Big Ships Go" (Richard Cowper)
- "Can These Bones Live?" (Ted Reynolds)
- "The Extraordinary Voyages of Amélie Bertrand" (Joanna Russ)

== Awards ==
The anthology placed eleventh in the 1981 Locus Poll Award for Best Anthology.

"The Way of Cross and Dragon" won the 1980 Hugo Award for Best Short Story, placed first in the Locus Poll Award for Best Short Story, and was nominated for the 1979 Nebula Award for Best Short Story.

"Options" was nominated for the 1979 Nebula Award for Best Novelette and the 1980 Hugo Award for Best Novelette, and placed second in the 1980 Locus Poll Award for Best Novelette.

"Unaccompanied Sonata" was nominated for the 1979 Nebula Award for Best Short Story and the 1980 Hugo Award for Best Short Story, and placed sixth in the 1980 Locus Poll Award for Best Shor Story.

"The Story Writer" was nominated for the 1979 Nebula Award for Best Novella and placed tenth in the 1980 Locus Poll Award for Best Novella.

"Daisy, in the Sun" was nominated for the 1980 Hugo Award for Best Short Story and placed tenth in the 1980 Locus Poll Award for Best Short Story.

"The Locusts" was nominated for the 1979 Analog Award for Best Novella/Novelette and the 1980 Hugo Award for Best Novelette, and placed sixteenth in the 1980 Locus Poll Award for Best Novelette.

"Out There Where the Big Ships Go" placed fourth in the 1980 Locus Poll Award for Best Novelette.

"Can These Bones Live?" won the 1979 Analog Award for Best Short Story, was nominated for the 1980 Hugo Award for Best Short Story, and placed eighteenth in the 1980 Locus Poll Award for Best Short Story.

"The Extraordinary Voyages of Amélie Bertrand" was nominated for the 1979 Nebula Award for Best Short Story and placed thirteenth in the 1980 Locus Poll Award for Best Short Story.
