= The 1986 Annual World's Best SF =

1986 anthology edited by Donald A. Wollheim and Arthur W. Saha

- Cover of first edition, 1986
- Editors: Donald A. Wollheim and Arthur W. Saha
- Cover artist: Vincent Di Fate
- Language: English
- Series: The Annual World’s Best SF
- Genre: Science fiction
- Publisher: DAW Books
- Publication date: 1986
- Publication place: United States
- Media type: Print (paperback)
- Pages: 303
- ISBN: 0-88677-136-6
- Preceded by: The 1985 Annual World's Best SF
- Followed by: The 1987 Annual World's Best SF

The 1986 Annual World's Best SF is an anthology of science fiction short stories edited by Donald A. Wollheim and Arthur W. Saha, the fourteenth volume in a series of nineteen. It was first published in paperback by DAW Books in June 1986, followed by a hardcover edition issued in August of the same year by the same publisher as a selection of the Science Fiction Book Club. For the hardcover edition the original cover art by Vincent Di Fate was replaced by a new cover painting by Ron Walotsky.

The book collects ten novellas, novelettes and short stories by various science fiction authors, with an introduction by Wollheim. The stories were previously published in 1985 in the magazines Analog Science Fiction and Fact, Amazing Stories, Omni, The Magazine of Fantasy & Science Fiction, Isaac Asimov's Science Fiction Magazine, and the anthologies The Third Omni Book of Science Fiction and Afterwar.

== Contents ==
- "Introduction" (Donald A. Wollheim)
- "Earthgate" (J. Brian Clarke)
- "On the Dream Channel Panel" (Ian Watson)
- "The Gods of Mars" (Gardner Dozois, Jack Dann and Michael Swanwick)
- "The Jaguar Hunter" (Lucius Shepard)
- "Sailing to Byzantium" (Robert Silverberg)
- "Webrider" (Jayge Carr)
- "With Virgil Oddum at the East Pole" (Harlan Ellison)
- "The Curse of Kings" (Connie Willis)
- "Fermi and Frost" (Frederik Pohl)
- "Pots" (C. J. Cherryh)

== Awards ==
The anthology placed ninth in the 1987 Locus Poll Award for Best Anthology.

"The Gods of Mars" was nominated for the 1985 Nebula Award for Best Short Story and placed ninth in the 1986 Locus Poll Award for Best Short Story.

"The Jaguar Hunter" was nominated for the 1985 Nebula Award for Best Novelette and the 1986 World Fantasy Award for Best Short Fiction, and placed fourth in the 1986 Locus Poll Award for Best Novelette.

"Sailing to Byzantium" won the 1985 Nebula Award for Best Novella, was nominated for the 1986 Hugo Award for Best Novella and the 1986 SF Chronicle Award for Best Novella, and placed second in the 1986 Locus Poll Award for Best Novella.

"With Virgil Oddum at the East Pole" placed first in the 1986 Locus Poll Award for Best Short Story.

"The Curse of Kings" placed twelfth in the 1986 Locus Poll Award for Best Novella.

"Fermi and Frost" won the 1986 Hugo Award for Best Short Story, was nominated for the 1986 SF Chronicle Award for Best Short Story, and placed second in the 1986 Locus Poll Award for Best Short Story.
