= The 1976 Annual World's Best SF =

Science fiction anthology

- Cover of first edition, 1976
- Editors: Donald A. Wollheim and Arthur W. Saha
- Cover artist: Jack Gaughan
- Language: English
- Series: The Annual World's Best SF
- Genre: Science fiction
- Publisher: DAW Books
- Publication date: 1976
- Publication place: United States
- Media type: Print (paperback)
- Pages: 304
- Preceded by: The 1975 Annual World's Best SF
- Followed by: The 1977 Annual World's Best SF

The 1976 Annual World's Best SF is an anthology of science fiction short stories edited by Donald A. Wollheim and Arthur W. Saha, the fifth volume in a series of nineteen. It was first published in paperback by DAW Books in May 1976, followed by a hardcover edition issued in August of the same year by the same publisher as a selection of the Science Fiction Book Club. For the hardcover edition the original cover art of Jack Gaughan was replaced by a new cover painting by Chet Jezierski. The paperback edition was reissued by DAW in December 1981 under the variant title Wollheim's World's Best SF: Series Five, this time with cover art by Oliviero Berni. A British hardcover edition was published by Dennis Dobson in March 1979 under the variant title The World's Best SF 3.

The book collects ten novellas, novelettes and short stories by various science fiction authors, with an introduction by Wollheim. The stories were previously published in 1974 and 1975 in the magazines The Magazine of Fantasy & Science Fiction, Analog, Amazing Science Fiction, and Galaxy, and the anthologies New Worlds 8 and Stopwatch.

== Contents ==
- "Introduction" (Donald A. Wollheim)
- "Catch That Zeppelin!" (Fritz Leiber)
- "The Peddler's Apprentice" (Joan D. Vinge and Vernor Vinge)
- "The Bees of Knowledge" (Barrington J. Bayley)
- "The Storms of Windhaven" (George R. R. Martin and Lisa Tuttle)
- "The Engineer and the Executioner" (Brian M. Stableford)
- "Allegiances" (Michael Bishop)
- "Child of All Ages" (P. J. Plauger)
- "Helbent 4" (Stephen Robinett)
- "The Protocols of the Elders of Britain" (John Brunner)
- "The Custodians" (Richard Cowper)

== Awards ==
The anthology placed seventh in the 1977 Locus Poll Award for Best Anthology.

"Catch That Zeppelin!" won the 1976 Nebula Award for Best Short Story and the 1976 Hugo Award for Best Short Story, and placed eleventh in the 1976 Locus Poll Award for Best Short Story.

"The Storms of Windhaven" was nominated for the 1975 Nebula Award for Best Novella and the 1976 Hugo Award for Best Novella, and placed first in the 1976 Locus Poll Award for Best Novella.

"Allegiances" placed eighth in the 1976 Locus Poll Award for Best Novella.

"Child of All Ages" was nominated for the 1975 Nebula Award for Best Short Story and the 1976 Hugo Award for Best Short Story, and placed third in the 1976 Locus Poll Award for Best Short Story.

"The Custodians" was nominated for the 1975 Nebula Award for Best Novelette and the 1976 Hugo Award for Best Novella, and placed sixth in the 1976 Locus Poll Award for Best Novella.
