= The Year's Best Fantasy Stories =

1975 anthology edited by Lin Carter

- First edition cover
- Author: Lin Carter (editor)
- Cover artist: George Barr
- Language: English
- Series: The Year's Best Fantasy Stories
- Genre: Fantasy
- Publisher: DAW Books
- Publication date: 1975
- Publication place: United States
- Media type: Print (paperback)
- Pages: 175
- Followed by: The Year's Best Fantasy Stories: 2

The Year's Best Fantasy Stories is an anthology of fantasy stories, edited by American writer Lin Carter. It was first published in paperback by DAW Books in 1975. Despite the anthology's title, it actually gathers together pieces originally published during a two-year period, 1973 and 1974.

== Summary ==
The book collects eleven novelettes and short stories by various fantasy authors deemed by the editor the best to be published during the period represented, together with an introductory survey of the year in fantasy, an essay on the year's best fantasy books, and introductory notes to the individual stories by the editor. The pieces include posthumously published works (the stories by Howard and Bok), and a "posthumous collaboration" (the story by Smith and Carter).

== Contents ==
- "The Year in Fantasy" (Lin Carter)
- "The Jewel of Arwen" (Marion Zimmer Bradley)
- "The Sword Dyrnwyn" (Lloyd Alexander)
- "The Temple of Abomination" (Robert E. Howard)
- "The Double Tower" (Clark Ashton Smith and Lin Carter)
- "Trapped in the Shadowland" (Fritz Leiber)
- "Black Hawk of Valkarth" (Lin Carter)
- "Jewel Quest" (Hannes Bok)
- "The Emperor's Fan" (L. Sprague de Camp)
- "Falcon's Mate" (Pat McIntosh)
- "The City of Madness" (Charles R. Saunders)
- "The Seventeen Virgins" (Jack Vance)
- "The Year's Best Fantasy Books" (Lin Carter)

== Reception ==
The anthology was reviewed by Judy Rosenbaum in The Science Fiction Review Monthly, October 1975, Chris Marler in Astral Dimensions #2, Winter 1975-1976, Richard Delap Delap's F & SF Review, January 1976, Frank Denton in The Diversifier #13 March 1976, and (in German) Hermann Urbanek in SF Perry Rhodan Magazin, April 1981, and Michael Adrian in Das Geheimnis der Taggari, 1981.
