= The 1974 Annual World's Best SF =

1974 anthology edited by Donald A. Wollheim and Arthur W. Saha

- Cover of first edition, 1974
- Editors: Donald A. Wollheim and Arthur W. Saha
- Cover artist: Jack Gaughan
- Language: English
- Series: The Annual World’s Best SF
- Genre: Science fiction
- Publisher: DAW Books
- Publication date: 1974
- Publication place: United States
- Media type: Print (paperback)
- Pages: 280
- Preceded by: The 1973 Annual World's Best SF
- Followed by: The 1975 Annual World's Best SF

The 1974 Annual World's Best SF is an anthology of science fiction short stories edited by Donald A. Wollheim and Arthur W. Saha, the third volume in a series of nineteen. It was first published in paperback by DAW Books in May 1974, followed by a hardcover edition issued in September of the same year by the same publisher as a selection of the Science Fiction Book Club. For the hardcover edition, the original cover art of Jack Gaughan was replaced by a new cover painting by Victor Valla. The paperback edition was reissued by DAW in December 1979 under the variant title Wollheim's World's Best SF: Series Three, this time with cover art by Vicente Segrelles. A British hardcover edition was published by The Elmfield Press in October 1975 under the variant title The World's Best SF Short Stories No. 1.

The book collects ten novelettes and short stories by various science fiction authors, with an introduction by Wollheim. Most of the stories were previously published in 1973 in the magazines Galaxy, Worlds of If, Vertex, The Magazine of Fantasy & Science Fiction, and Amazing Science Fiction, and the anthologies View from Another Shore and New Writings in SF 22.

== Contents ==
- "Introduction" (Donald A. Wollheim)
- "A Supplicant in Space" (Robert Sheckley)
- "Parthen" (R. A. Lafferty)
- "Doomship" (Frederik Pohl and Jack Williamson)
- "Weed of Time" (Norman Spinrad) (Originally published in 1970)
- "A Modest Genius" (translation of "Skromnyi Geniy", 1963) (Vadim Shefner)
- "The Deathbird" (Harlan Ellison)
- "Evane" (E. C. Tubb)
- "Moby, Too" (Gordon Eklund)
- "Death and Designation Among the Asadi" (Michael Bishop)
- "Construction Shack" (Clifford D. Simak)

== Awards ==
"The Deathbird" was nominated for the 1973 Nebula Award for Best Novelette, won the 1974 Hugo Award for Best Novelette, and placed first in the 1974 Locus Poll Award for Best Short Fiction.

"Death and Designation Among the Asadi" was nominated for the 1973 Nebula Award for Best Novella and the 1974 Hugo Award for Best Novella, and placed seventh in the 1974 Locus Poll Award for Best Novella.

"Construction Shack" was nominated for the 1974 Hugo Award for Best Short Story.
