= The Year's Best Fantasy Stories: 14 =

1988 anthology edited by Arthur W. Saha

- Cover art from the first edition
- Author: Arthur W. Saha (editor)
- Cover artist: Keith Parkinson
- Language: English
- Series: The Year's Best Fantasy Stories
- Genre: Fantasy
- Publisher: DAW Books
- Publication date: 1988
- Publication place: United States
- Media type: Print (paperback)
- Pages: 239 pp
- ISBN: 0-88677-307-5
- OCLC: 18955649
- Preceded by: The Year's Best Fantasy Stories: 13

The Year's Best Fantasy Stories: 14 is an anthology of fantasy stories, edited by Arthur W. Saha. It was first published in paperback by DAW Books in November, 1988.

== Summary ==
The book collects thirteen novelettes and short stories by various fantasy authors, originally published in 1987 and deemed by the editor the best from the period represented, together with an introduction by the editor.

== Contents ==
- "Introduction" (Arthur W. Saha)
- "Night’s Daughter, Day’s Desire" (Tanith Lee)
- "The Little Magic Shop" (Bruce Sterling)
- "Transients" (Darrell Schweitzer)
- "The Snow Apples" (Gwyneth Jones)
- "The Glassblower’s Dragon" (Lucius Shepard)
- "The Apotheosis of Isaac Rosen" (Jack M. Dann and Jeanne Van Buren Dann)
- "Buffalo Gals, Won’t You Come Out Tonight" (Ursula K. Le Guin)
- "Waiting for a Bus" (John Whitbourn)
- "Happy Hour" (J. N. Williamson)
- "Ever After" (Susan Palwick)
- "A Little of What You Fancy" (Mary Catherine McDaniel)
- "Inky" (Jayge Carr)
- "Maxie Silas" (Augustine Funnell)
