= The Year's Best Fantasy Stories: 5 =

1980 anthology edited by Lin Carter

- Cover art from the first edition
- Editor: Lin Carter
- Cover artist: Jordi Penalva
- Language: English
- Series: The Year's Best Fantasy Stories
- Genre: Fantasy
- Publisher: DAW Books
- Publication date: 1980
- Publication place: United States
- Media type: Print (paperback)
- Pages: 204
- ISBN: 0-87997-510-5
- OCLC: 6566609
- Preceded by: The Year's Best Fantasy Stories: 4
- Followed by: The Year's Best Fantasy Stories: 6

The Year's Best Fantasy Stories: 5 is an anthology of fantasy stories, edited by American writer Lin Carter. It was first published in paperback by DAW Books in January 1980. Despite the anthology's title, it gathers together pieces originally published during a three-year period, 1978 to 1980, with the preponderance of them from 1978. One story, "The Troll" by T. H. White, was originally published in 1935.

== Summary ==
The book collects twelve novelettes and short stories by various fantasy authors, deemed by the editor the best from the period represented, together with an introductory survey of the year in fantasy, an essay on the year's best fantasy books, and introductory notes to the individual stories by the editor. The pieces include posthumous works (the stories by White and Howard) and a pseudonymous work (the story by "Grail Undwin", actually by Carter).

== Contents ==
- "The Year in Fantasy" (Lin Carter)
- "The Troll" (T. H. White)
- "In the Balance" (Tanith Lee)
- "The Gem in the Tower" (L. Sprague de Camp and Lin Carter)
- "Above Ker-Is" (Evangeline Walton)
- "Ms. Lipshutz and the Goblin" (Marvin Kaye)
- "Rhian and Garanhir" (Grail Undwin)
- "Lord of the Dead" (Robert E. Howard)
- "Child of Air" (Pat McIntosh)
- "A Malady of Magicks" (Craig Shaw Gardner)
- "St. George" (David Mallory)
- "Astral Stray" (Adrian Cole)
- "Demon and Demoiselle" (Janet Fox)
- "The Year's Best Fantasy Books" (Lin Carter)
