= The 1987 Annual World's Best SF =

1987 anthology edited by Donald A. Wollheim and Arthur W. Saha

- Cover of first edition, 1987
- Editors: Donald A. Wollheim and Arthur W. Saha
- Cover artist: Tony Roberts
- Language: English
- Series: The Annual World’s Best SF
- Genre: Science fiction
- Publisher: DAW Books
- Publication date: 1987
- Publication place: United States
- Media type: Print (paperback)
- Pages: 303
- ISBN: 0-88677-203-6
- Preceded by: The 1986 Annual World's Best SF
- Followed by: The 1988 Annual World's Best SF

The 1987 Annual World's Best SF is an anthology of science fiction short stories edited by Donald A. Wollheim and Arthur W. Saha, the fourteenth volume in a series of nineteen. It was first published in paperback by DAW Books in June 1987, followed by a hardcover edition issued in July of the same year by the same publisher as a selection of the Science Fiction Book Club. For the hardcover edition the original cover art by Tony Roberts was replaced by a new cover painting by Richard Powers.

The book collects ten novellas, novelettes and short stories by various science fiction authors, with an introduction by Wollheim. The stories were previously published in 1986 in the magazines Omni, Amazing Stories, Isaac Asimov's Science Fiction Magazine, and The Magazine of Fantasy & Science Fiction, and the anthology L. Ron Hubbard Presents Writers of the Future, Volume II.

== Contents ==
- "Introduction" (Donald A. Wollheim)
- "Permafrost" (Roger Zelazny)
- "Timerider" (Doris Egan)
- "Pretty Boy Crossover" (Pat Cadigan)
- "R & R" (Lucius Shepard)
- "Lo, How an Oak E'er Blooming" (Suzette Haden Elgin)
- "Dream in a Bottle" (Jerry Meredith and D. E. Smirl)
- "Into Gold" (Tanith Lee)
- "The Lions Are Asleep This Night" (Howard Waldrop)
- "Against Babylon" (Robert Silverberg)
- "Strangers in Paradise" (Damon Knight)

== Awards ==
The anthology placed seventh in the 1988 Locus Poll Award for Best Anthology.

"Permafrost" won the 1987 Hugo Award for Best Novelette, was nominated for the 1986 Nebula Award for Best Novelette, and placed fifth in the 1987 Locus Poll Award for Best Novelette.

"Pretty Boy Crossover" won the 1987 SF Chronicle Award for Best Short Story, was nominated for the 1986 Nebula Award for Best Short Story and the 1987 Theodore Sturgeon Memorial Award, and placed ninth in the 1987 Locus Poll Award for Best Short Story.

"R & R" won the 1986 Nebula Award for Best Novella and the 1987 SF Chronicle Award for Best Novella, placed first in the 1987 Locus Poll Award for Best Novella, and was nominated for the 1987 Asimov's Readers' Poll Award for Best Novella and the 1987 Hugo Award for Best Novella.

"Lo, How an Oak E'er Blooming" placed seventeenth in the 1987 Locus Poll Award for Best Short Story.

"Into Gold" placed seventeenth in the 1987 Locus Poll Award for Best Novelette.

"The Lions Are Asleep This Night" was nominated for the 1986 Nebula Award for Best Short Story and the 1987 Theodore Sturgeon Memorial Award, and placed thirteenth in the 1987 Locus Poll Award for Best Short Story.

"Against Babylon" placed eighteenth in the 1987 Locus Poll Award for Best Novelette.

"Strangers in Paradise" placed sixteenth in the 1987 Locus Poll Award for Best Short Story.
