= The Year's Best Fantasy Stories: 2 =

1976 anthology edited by Lin Carter

- Cover art from the first edition
- Author: Lin Carter (editor)
- Cover artist: George Barr
- Language: English
- Series: The Year's Best Fantasy Stories
- Genre: Fantasy
- Publisher: DAW Books
- Publication date: 1976
- Publication place: United States
- Media type: Print (paperback)
- Pages: 192 pp
- Preceded by: The Year's Best Fantasy Stories
- Followed by: The Year's Best Fantasy Stories: 3

The Year's Best Fantasy Stories: 2 is a 1976 anthology of fantasy stories, edited by American writer Lin Carter. It was first published in paperback by DAW Books.

== Summary ==
The book collects twelve novelettes and short stories by various fantasy authors, originally published in the years 1975 and 1976 that were deemed by the editor the best from the period represented, together with an introductory survey of the year in fantasy, an essay on the year's best fantasy books, and introductory notes to the individual stories by the editor. The pieces include a "posthumous collaboration" (the story by Smith and Carter).

An Italian edition published in 1992 also included the novel The Witch's Daughter by R. A. Salvatore.

== Contents ==
- "The Year in Fantasy" (Lin Carter)
- "The Demoness" (Tanith Lee)
- "The Night of the Unicorn" (Thomas Burnett Swann)
- "Cry Wolf" (Pat McIntosh)
- "Under the Thumbs of the Gods" (Fritz Leiber)
- "The Guardian of the Vault" (Paul Spencer)
- "The Lamp from Atlantis" (L. Sprague de Camp)
- "Xiurhn" (Gary Myers)
- "The City in the Jewel" (Lin Carter)
- "In 'Ygiroth" (Walter C. DeBill, Jr.)
- "The Scroll of Morloc" (Clark Ashton Smith and Lin Carter)
- "Payment in Kind" (Caradoc A. Cador)
- "Milord Sir Smiht, the English Wizard" (Avram Davidson)
- "The Year's Best Fantasy Books" (Lin Carter)

== Reception ==
The anthology was reviewed by Richard Delap in Delap's F & SF Review, November 1976.
