= The Year's Best Fantasy Stories: 4 =

1978 anthology edited by Lin Carter

- Cover art from the first edition
- Author: Lin Carter (editor)
- Cover artist: Esteban Maroto
- Language: English
- Series: The Year's Best Fantasy Stories
- Genre: Fantasy
- Publisher: DAW Books
- Publication date: 1978
- Publication place: United States
- Media type: Print (paperback)
- Pages: 208 pp
- ISBN: 0-87997-425-7
- Preceded by: The Year's Best Fantasy Stories: 3
- Followed by: The Year's Best Fantasy Stories: 5

The Year's Best Fantasy Stories: 4 is an anthology of fantasy stories, edited by American writer Lin Carter. It was first published in paperback by DAW Books in 1978.

== Summary ==
The book collects eleven novelettes and short stories by various fantasy authors, originally published in the years 1977 and 1978 that were deemed by the editor the best from the period represented, together with an introductory survey of the year in fantasy, an essay on the year's best fantasy books, and introductory notes to the individual stories by the editor. The pieces include a pseudonymous work (the story by "Grail Undwin", actually by Carter) and "posthumous collaborations" (the story by Howard and Offutt and the story by Smith, which was completed by Carter).

Carter's survey of the year is notable for a blistering review of Terry Brooks's The Sword of Shannara, described as "the single most cold-blooded, complete rip-off of another book that I have ever read," the other book in question being J. R. R. Tolkien's The Lord of the Rings. Per Carter, "Brooks wasn't trying to imitate Tolkien's prose, just steal his story line and complete cast of characters, and did it with such clumsiness and so heavy-handedly, that he virtually rubbed your nose in it."

== Contents ==
- "The Year in Fantasy" (Lin Carter)
- "The Tale of Hauk" (Poul Anderson)
- "A Farmer on the Clyde" (Grail Undwin)
- "Prince Alcouz and the Magician" (Clark Ashton Smith)
- "Nekht Semerkeht" (Robert E. Howard and Andrew J. Offutt)
- "The Pillars of Hell" (Lin Carter)
- "Lok the Depressor" (Philip Coakley)
- "'Hark! Was That the Squeal of an Angry Thoat?'" (Avram Davidson)
- "The Cloak of Dreams" (Pat McIntosh)
- "The Land of Sorrow" (Phyllis Eisenstein)
- "Odds Against the Gods" (Tanith Lee)
- "The Changer of Names" (Ramsey Campbell)
- "The Year's Best Fantasy Books" (Lin Carter)

== Reception ==
Don D'Ammassa, writing in Critical Mass #3, dismisses the Undwin, Smith/Carter and Carter stories as "very forgettable," rating the Anderson and Campbell stories as the "two best pieces," and those by Lee, Eisenstein, and Howard/Offutt "[l]ess outstanding but still worthwhile." He finds Coakley and McIntosh's contributions as "pleasant surprise[s]," and Davidson's as "an amusing anecdote."

The anthology was also reviewed by David A. Truesdale in Science Fiction Review, August 1979, and John Weeks in Science Fiction & Fantasy Book Review, October 1979.
