= The Year's Best Fantasy Stories: 7 =

1981 anthology edited by Arthur W. Saha

- Cover art from the first edition
- Editor: Arthur W. Saha
- Cover artist: Michael Whelan
- Language: English
- Series: The Year's Best Fantasy Stories
- Genre: Fantasy
- Publisher: DAW Books
- Publication date: 1981
- Publication place: United States
- Media type: Print (paperback)
- Pages: 191
- ISBN: 0-87997-661-6
- OCLC: 7915989
- Preceded by: The Year's Best Fantasy Stories: 6
- Followed by: The Year's Best Fantasy Stories: 8

The Year's Best Fantasy Stories: 7 is an anthology of fantasy stories, edited by Arthur W. Saha. It was first published in paperback by DAW Books in 1981.

== Summary ==
The book collects eleven novelettes and short stories by various fantasy authors, originally published in 1980 and deemed by the editor the best from the period represented, together with an introduction by him.

== Contents ==
- "Introduction" (Arthur W. Saha)
- "Wolfland" (Tanith Lee)
- "Spidersong" (Susan C. Petrey)
- "The Sleep of Trees" (Jane Yolen)
- "Kevin Malone" (Gene Wolfe)
- "The George Business" (Roger Zelazny)
- "The Princess and the Bear" (Orson Scott Card)
- "Proteus" (Paul H. Cook)
- "Keeper of the Wood" (Caradoc A. Cador)
- "Lan Lung" (M. Lucie Chin)
- "Melpomene, Calliope... and Fred " (Nicholas V. Yermakov)
- "The Narrow House" (Phillip C. Heath)
