= The 1983 Annual World's Best SF =

1983 anthology edited by Donald A. Wollheim and Arthur W. Saha

- Cover of first edition.
- Editors: Donald A. Wollheim and Arthur W. Saha
- Language: English
- Series: The Annual World’s Best SF
- Genre: Science fiction
- Publisher: DAW Books
- Publication date: 1983
- Publication place: United States
- Media type: Print (paperback)
- Pages: 255
- ISBN: 0-87997-822-8
- Preceded by: The 1982 Annual World's Best SF
- Followed by: The 1984 Annual World's Best SF

The 1983 Annual World's Best SF is an anthology of science fiction short stories edited by Donald A. Wollheim and Arthur W. Saha, the twelfth volume in a series of nineteen. It was first published in paperback by DAW Books in May 1983, followed by a hardcover edition issued in September of the same year by the same publisher as a selection of the Science Fiction Book Club. For the hardcover edition the original cover art was replaced by a new cover painting by Richard Powers.

The book collects ten novellas, novelettes and short stories by various science fiction authors, with an introduction by Wollheim. The stories were previously published in 1982 in the magazines Analog Science Fiction/Science Fact, Isaac Asimov's Science Fiction Magazine, Omni, Rod Serling's The Twilight Zone Magazine, and The Magazine of Fantasy & Science Fiction, and the anthology Perpetual Light.

== Contents ==
- "Introduction" (Donald A. Wollheim)
- "The Scourge" (James White)
- "A Letter from the Clearys" (Connie Willis)
- "Farmer on the Dole" (Frederik Pohl)
- "Playing the Game" (Gardner Dozois and Jack Dann)
- "Pawn’s Gambit" (Timothy Zahn)
- "The Comedian" (Timothy R. Sullivan)
- "Written in Water" (Tanith Lee)
- "Souls" (Joanna Russ)
- "Swarm" (Bruce Sterling)
- "Peg-Man" (Rudy Rucker)

== Awards ==
The anthology placed fourth in the 1983 Locus Poll Award for Best Anthology.

"The Scourge" was nominated for the 1982 Analog Award for Best Novella/Novelette and placed ninth in the 1983 Locus Poll Award for Best Short Story.

"A Letter from the Clearys" won the 1982 Nebula Award for Best Short Story and placed seventh in the 1983 Locus Poll Award for Best Short Story.

"Farmer on the Dole" placed sixteenth in the 1983 Locus Poll Award for Best Short Story.

"Pawn's Gambit" won the 1982 Analog Award for Best Novella/Novelette, was nominated for the 1983 Hugo Award for Best Novelette, and placed eighth in the 1983 Locus Poll Award for Best Novelette.

"The Comedian" placed twenty-fourth in the 1983 Locus Poll Award for Best Short Story.

"Written in Water" placed nineteenth in the 1983 Locus Poll Award for Best Short Story.

"Souls" was nominated for the 1982 Nebula Award for Best Novella, won the 1983 SF Chronicle Award for Best Novella and the 1983 Hugo Award for Best Novella, and placed first in the 1983 Locus Poll Award for Best Novella.

"Swarm" was nominated for the 1982 Nebula Award for Best Novelette and the 1983 Hugo Award for Best Novelette, and placed sixth in the 1983 Locus Poll Award for Best Novelette.
