= The 1979 Annual World's Best SF =

1979 anthology edited by Donald A. Wollheim and Arthur W. Saha

- Cover of first edition, 1979
- Editors: Donald A. Wollheim and Arthur W. Saha
- Cover artist: Jack Gaughan
- Language: English
- Series: The Annual World’s Best SF
- Genre: Science fiction
- Publisher: DAW Books
- Publication date: 1979
- Publication place: United States
- Media type: Print (paperback)
- Pages: 268
- ISBN: 0-87997-459-1
- Preceded by: The 1978 Annual World's Best SF
- Followed by: The 1980 Annual World's Best SF

The 1979 Annual World's Best SF is an anthology of science fiction short stories edited by Donald A. Wollheim and Arthur W. Saha, the eighth volume in a series of nineteen. It was first published in paperback by DAW Books in May 1979. It was reissued by DAW in 1984 under the variant title Wollheim's World's Best SF: Series Eight, this time with cover art by Olivero Berni.

The book collects ten novellas, novelettes and short stories by various science fiction authors, with an introduction by Wollheim. The stories were previously published in 1978 in the magazines Analog Science Fiction/Science Fact, Isaac Asimov's Science Fiction Magazine, The Magazine of Fantasy & Science Fiction, and the anthologies Envisioned Worlds, Cassandra Rising, Stellar #4, and Universe 8.

== Contents ==
- "Introduction" (Donald A. Wollheim)
- "Come to the Party" (Frank Herbert and F. M. Busby)
- "Creator" (David Lake)
- "Dance Band on the Titanic" (Jack L. Chalker)
- "Cassandra" (C. J. Cherryh)
- "In Alien Flesh" (Gregory Benford)
- "SQ" (Ursula K. Le Guin)
- "The Persistence of Vision" (John Varley)
- "We Who Stole the Dream" (James Tiptree, Jr.)
- "Scattershot" (Greg Bear)
- "Carruthers' Last Stand" (Dan Henderson)

== Awards ==
The anthology placed eighth in the 1980 Locus Poll Award for Best Anthology.

"Cassandra" won the 1979 Hugo Award for Best Short Story, was nominated for the 1978 Nebula Award for Best Short Story, and placed sixth in the 1979 Locus Poll Award for Best Short Story.

"In Alien Flesh" placed sixth in the 1979 Locus Poll Award for Best Novelette.

"SQ" placed ninth in the 1979 Locus Poll Award for Best Short Story.

"The Persistence of Vision" won the 1978 Nebula Award for Best Novella and the 1979 Hugo Award for Best Novella, placed first in the 1979 Locus Award for Best Novella, and was nominated for the 1979 Ditmar Award for Best International Long Fiction.
