= The Year's Best Fantasy Stories: 3 =

1977 anthology edited by Lin Carter

- Cover art from the first edition
- Author: Lin Carter (editor)
- Cover artist: Josh Kirby
- Language: English
- Series: The Year's Best Fantasy Stories
- Genre: Fantasy
- Publisher: DAW Books
- Publication date: 1977
- Publication place: United States
- Media type: Print (paperback)
- Pages: 237 pp
- ISBN: 0-87997-338-2
- Preceded by: The Year's Best Fantasy Stories: 2
- Followed by: The Year's Best Fantasy Stories: 4

The Year's Best Fantasy Stories: 3 is a 1977 anthology of fantasy stories, edited by American writer Lin Carter. It was first published in paperback by DAW Books.

== Summary ==
The book collects eleven novelettes and short stories by various fantasy authors, originally published in the years 1976 and 1977 that were deemed by the editor the best from the period represented, together with an introductory survey of the year in fantasy, an essay on the year's best fantasy books, and introductory notes to the individual stories by the editor. The piece includes a "posthumous collaboration" (the story by Smith and Carter).

A 1994 Italian edition also included the novel Legion From the Shadows by Karl Edward Wagner.

== Contents ==
- "The Year in Fantasy" (Lin Carter)
- "Eudoric's Unicorn" (L. Sprague de Camp)
- "Shadow of a Demon" (Gardner F. Fox)
- "Ring of Black Stone" (Pat McIntosh)
- "The Lonely Songs of Laren Dorr" (George R. R. Martin)
- "Two Suns Setting" (Karl Edward Wagner)
- "The Stairs in the Crypt" (Clark Ashton Smith and Lin Carter)
- "The Goblin Blade" (Raul Garcia Capella)
- "The Dark King" (C. J. Cherryh)
- "Black Moonlight" (Lin Carter)
- "The Snout in the Alcove" (Gary Myers)
- "The Pool of the Moon" (Charles R. Saunders)
- "The Year's Best Fantasy Books" (Lin Carter)

== Reception ==
The anthology was reviewed by David A. Truesdale in The Diversifier #24, January 1978
