= The 1984 Annual World's Best SF =

1984 anthology edited by Donald A. Wollheim and Arthur W. Saha

- Cover of first edition, 1984
- Author: edited by Donald A. Wollheim and Arthur W. Saha
- Cover artist: Vincent Di Fate
- Language: English
- Series: The Annual World’s Best SF
- Genre: Science fiction
- Publisher: DAW Books
- Publication date: 1984
- Publication place: United States
- Media type: Print (paperback)
- Pages: 256
- ISBN: 0-87997-934-8
- Preceded by: The 1983 Annual World's Best SF
- Followed by: The 1985 Annual World's Best SF

The 1984 Annual World's Best SF is an anthology of science fiction short stories edited by Donald A. Wollheim and Arthur W. Saha, the thirteenth volume in a series of nineteen. It was first published in paperback by DAW Books in June 1984, followed by a hardcover edition issued in August of the same year by the same publisher as a selection of the Science Fiction Book Club. For the hardcover edition the original cover art by Vincent Di Fate was replaced by a new cover painting by Richard Powers.

The book collects ten novellas, novelettes and short stories by various science fiction authors, with an introduction by Wollheim. The stories were previously published in 1983 in the magazines Analog Science Fiction/Science Fact, Isaac Asimov's Science Fiction Magazine, Amazing Science Fiction, and The Magazine of Fantasy & Science Fiction, and the anthology Chrysalis 10.

== Contents ==
- "Introduction" (Donald A. Wollheim)
- "Blood Music" (Greg Bear)
- "Potential" (Isaac Asimov)
- "Knight of Shallows" (Rand B. Lee)
- "Spending a Day at the Lottery Fair" (Frederik Pohl)
- "In the Face of My Enemy" (Joseph H. Delaney)
- "The Nanny" (Thomas Wylde)
- "The Leaves of October" (Don Sakers)
- "As Time Goes By" (Tanith Lee)
- "The Harvest of Wolves" (Mary R. Gentle)
- "Homefaring" (Robert Silverberg)

== Awards ==
The anthology placed sixth in the 1984 Locus Poll Award for Best Anthology.

"Blood Music" won the 1983 Nebula Award for Best Novelette.and the 1984 Hugo Award for Best Novelette, placed fourth in the 1984 Locus Poll Award for Best Novelette, and was nominated for the 1984 SF Chronicle Award for Best Novelette.

"Potential" placed sixteenth in the 1984 Locus Poll Award for Best Short Story.

"Spending a Day at the Lottery Fair" placed third in the 1984 Locus Poll Award for Best Short Story.

"In the Face of My Enemy" was nominated for the 1984 Hugo Award for Best Novella and placed tenth in the 1984 Locus Poll Award for Best Novella.

"The Leaves of October" was nominated for the 1983 Analog Award for Best Novella/Novelette.

"Homefaring" was nominated for the 1983 Nebula Award for Best Novella and the 1984 SF Chronicle Award for Best Novella, and placed fourth in the 1984 Locus Poll Award for Best Novella.
