= The 1990 Annual World's Best SF =

1990 anthology edited by Donald A. Wollheim and Arthur W. Saha

- Cover of first edition, 1990
- Editors: Donald A. Wollheim and Arthur W. Saha
- Cover artist: Jim Burns
- Language: English
- Series: The Annual World’s Best SF
- Genre: Science fiction
- Publisher: DAW Books
- Publication date: 1990
- Publication place: United States
- Media type: Print (paperback)
- Pages: 341
- ISBN: 0-88677-424-1
- Preceded by: The 1989 Annual World's Best SF

The 1990 Annual World's Best SF is an anthology of science fiction short stories edited by Donald A. Wollheim and Arthur W. Saha, the nineteenth volume in a series of nineteen. It was first published in paperback by DAW Books in July 1990, followed by a hardcover edition issued in August of the same year by the same publisher as a selection of the Science Fiction Book Club. For the hardcover edition the original cover art of Jim Burns was replaced by a new cover painting by Richard Powers.

The book collects twelve novelettes and short stories by various science fiction authors, with an introduction by Wollheim. The stories were previously published in 1989 in the magazines Amazing Science Fiction, Interzone, The Magazine of Fantasy & Science Fiction, and Isaac Asimov's Science Fiction Magazine, and the anthologies Zenith: The Best in New British Science Fiction and What Might Have Been? Vol II: Alternate Heroes.

== Contents ==
- "Introduction" (Donald A. Wollheim)
- "Alphas" (Gregory Benford)
- "The Magic Bullet" (Brian Stableford)
- "North of the Abyss" (Brian W. Aldiss)
- "Chiprunner" (Robert Silverberg)
- "Abe Lincoln in McDonald's" (James Morrow)
- "Death Ship" (Barrington J. Bayley)
- "In Translation" (Lisa Tuttle)
- "A Sleep and a Forgetting" (Robert Silverberg)
- "Not Without Honor" (Judith Moffett)
- "Dogwalker" (Orson Scott Card)
- "Surrender" (Lucius Shepard)
- "War Fever" (J. G. Ballard)

== Awards ==
The anthology placed fifth in the 1990 Locus Poll Award for Best Anthology.

"Alphas" placed twenty-first in the 1990 Locus Poll Award for Best Short Story.

"Abe Lincoln in McDonald's" placed eighth in the 1990 Locus Poll Award for Best Short Story.

"In Translation" won the 1989 British Science Fiction Award for Short Fiction.

"A Sleep and a Forgetting" placed nineteenth in the 1990 Locus Poll Award for Best Novelette.

"Not Without Honor" was nominated for the 1990 Asimov's Readers' Poll -- Novelette and placed twenty-third in the 1990 Locus Poll Award for Best Novelette.

"Dogwalker" was nominated for the 1990 Asimov's Readers' Poll -- Novelette and the 1990 Hugo Award for Best Novelette, and placed first in the 1990 Locus Poll Award for Best Novelette.

"Surrender" was nominated for the 1990 Asimov's Readers' Poll -- Novelette and placed eighth in the 1990 Locus Poll Award for Best Novelette.

"War Fever" placed tenth in the 1990 Locus Poll Award for Best Novelette.
