= The 1985 Annual World's Best SF =

1985 anthology edited by Donald A. Wollheim and Arthur W. Saha

- Cover of first edition, 1985
- Author: edited by Donald A. Wollheim and Arthur W. Saha
- Cover artist: Frank Kelly Freas
- Language: English
- Series: The Annual World’s Best SF
- Genre: Science fiction
- Publisher: DAW Books
- Publication date: 1985
- Publication place: United States
- Media type: Print (paperback)
- Pages: 302 pp.
- ISBN: 0-88677-047-5
- Preceded by: The 1984 Annual World's Best SF
- Followed by: The 1986 Annual World's Best SF

The 1985 Annual World's Best SF is an anthology of science fiction short stories edited by Donald A. Wollheim and Arthur W. Saha, the fourteenth volume in a series of nineteen. It was first published in paperback by DAW Books in June 1985, followed by a hardcover edition issued in September of the same year by the same publisher as a selection of the Science Fiction Book Club. For the hardcover edition the original cover art by Frank Kelly Freas was replaced by a new cover painting by Richard Powers.

The book collects ten novellas, novelettes and short stories by various science fiction authors, with an introduction by Wollheim. The stories were previously published in 1984 in the magazines The Magazine of Fantasy & Science Fiction, The Missouri Review, and Isaac Asimov's Science Fiction Magazine, and the anthologies Habitats and The Clarion Awards.

== Contents ==
- "Introduction" (Donald A. Wollheim)
- "The Picture Man" (John Dalmas)
- "Cash Crop" (Connie Willis)
- "We Remember Babylon" (Ian Watson)
- "What Makes Us Human" (Stephen R. Donaldson)
- "Salvador" (Lucius Shepard)
- "Press Enter []" (John Varley)
- "The Aliens Who Knew, I Mean, Everything" (George Alec Effinger)
- "Bloodchild" (Octavia E. Butler)
- "The Coming of the Goonga" (Gary W. Shockley)
- "Medra" (Tanith Lee)

== Awards ==
The anthology placed eighth in the 1986 Locus Poll Award for Best Anthology.

"We Remember Babylon" placed twenty-third in the 1985 Locus Poll Award for Best Novelette.

"Salvador" was nominated for the 1984 Nebula Award for Best Short Story and the 1985 Hugo Award for Best Short Story, won the 1985 SF Chronicle Award for Best Short Story, and placed first in the Locus Poll Award for Best Short Story.

"Press Enter []" won the 1984 Nebula Award for Best Novella, the 1985 SF Chronicle Award for Best Novella, and the 1985 Hugo Award for Best Novella, and placed first in the 1985 Locus Poll Award for Best Novella.

"The Aliens Who Knew, I Mean, Everything" was nominated for the 1984 Nebula Award for Best Short Story, the 1985 SF Chronicle Award for Best Short Story, and the 1985 Hugo Award for Best Short Story, and placed third in the 1985 Locus Poll Award for Best Short Story.

"Bloodchild" won the 1984 Nebula Award for Best Novelette, the 1985 SF Chronicle Award for Best Novelette, and the 1985 Hugo Award for Best Novelette, and placed first in the 1985 Locus Poll Award for Best Novelette.
