= The 1981 Annual World's Best SF =

1981 science fiction anthology

- Cover of first edition.
- Editors: Donald A. Wollheim and Arthur W. Saha
- Cover artist: Michael Mariano
- Language: English
- Series: The Annual World’s Best SF
- Genre: Science fiction
- Publisher: DAW Books
- Publication date: 1981
- Publication place: United States
- Media type: Print (paperback)
- Pages: 252
- ISBN: 0-87997-617-9
- Preceded by: The 1980 Annual World's Best SF
- Followed by: The 1982 Annual World's Best SF

The 1981 Annual World's Best SF is an anthology of science fiction short stories edited by Donald A. Wollheim and Arthur W. Saha, the tenth volume in a series of nineteen. It was first published in paperback by DAW Books in May 1981, followed by a hardcover edition issued in August of the same year by the same publisher as a selection of the Science Fiction Book Club. For the hardcover edition the original cover art of Michael Mariano was replaced by a new cover painting by John Gampert.

The book collects ten novellas, novelettes and short stories by various science fiction authors, with an introduction by Wollheim. The stories were previously published in 1980 in the magazines Isaac Asimov's Science Fiction Magazine, Omni, Analog Science Fiction/Science Fact, and The Magazine of Fantasy & Science Fiction, and the anthologies New Voices III, Stellar #5, Universe 10, and Interfaces.

== Contents ==
- "Introduction" (Donald A. Wollheim)
- "Variation on a Theme from Beethoven" (Sharon Webb)
- "Beatnik Bayou" (John Varley)
- "Elbow Room" (Marion Zimmer Bradley)
- "The Ugly Chickens" (Howard Waldrop)
- "Prime Time" (Norman Spinrad)
- "Nightflyers" (George R. R. Martin)
- "A Spaceship Built of Stone" (Lisa Tuttle)
- "Window" (Bob Leman)
- "The Summer Sweet, the Winter Wild" (Michael G. Coney)
- "Achronos" (Lee Killough)

== Awards ==
The anthology placed seventh in the 1982 Locus Poll Award for Best Anthology.

"Variation on a Theme from Beethoven" placed ninth in the 1981 Locus Poll Award for Best Novelette.

"Beatnik Bayou" was nominated for the 1980 Nebula Award for Best Novelette and the 1981 Hugo Award for Best Novelette, and placed second in the 1981 Locus Poll Award for Best Novelette.

"The Ugly Chickens" won the 1980 Nebula Award for Best Novelette and the 1981 World Fantasy Award for Best Short Fiction, was nominated for the 1981 Balrog Award for Short Fiction and the 1981 Hugo Award for Best Novelette, and placed fifth in the 1981 Locus Poll Award for Best Novelette.

"Prime Time" placed eleventh in the 1981 Locus Poll Award for Best Short Story.

"Nightflyers" won the 1980 Analog Award for Best Novella/Novelette, was nominated for the 1981 Hugo Award for Best Novella, and placed first in the 1981 Locus Poll Award for Best Novella.

"Window" was nominated for the 1980 Nebula Award for Best Short Story and placed fourth in the 1981 Locus Poll Award for Best Short Story.
