= The 1989 Annual World's Best SF =

1989 anthology edited by Donald A. Wollheim and Arthur W. Saha

- Cover of first edition, 1989
- Editors: Donald A. Wollheim and Arthur W. Saha
- Cover artist: Jim Burns
- Language: English
- Series: The Annual World’s Best SF
- Genre: Science fiction
- Publisher: DAW Books
- Publication date: 1989
- Publication place: United States
- Media type: Print (paperback)
- Pages: 315
- ISBN: 0-88677-353-9
- Preceded by: The 1988 Annual World's Best SF
- Followed by: The 1990 Annual World's Best SF

The 1989 Annual World's Best SF is an anthology of science fiction short stories edited by Donald A. Wollheim and Arthur W. Saha, the eighteenth volume in a series of nineteen. It was first published in paperback by DAW Books in June 1989, followed by a hardcover edition issued in September of the same year by the same publisher as a selection of the Science Fiction Book Club. For the hardcover edition the original cover art by Jim Burns was replaced by a new cover painting by Richard M. Powers.

The book collects eleven novellas, novelettes and short stories by various science fiction authors, with an introduction by Isaac Asimov taking the place of the usual such effort by Wollheim. The stories were previously published in 1988 in the magazines Interzone, Analog Science Fiction and Fact, Isaac Asimov's Science Fiction Magazine, Omni, Amazing Stories, and Rod Serling's The Twilight Zone Magazine, the collection Dance Band on the Titanic, and the anthology Other Edens II.

== Contents ==
- "Introduction" (Isaac Asimov)
- "The Giving Plague" (David Brin)
- "Peaches for Mad Molly" (Steven Gould)
- "Shaman" (John Shirley)
- "Schrödinger's Kitten" (George Alec Effinger)
- "The Flies of Memory" (Ian Watson)
- "Skin Deep" (Kristine Kathryn Rusch)
- "A Madonna of the Machine" (Tanith Lee)
- "Waiting for the Olympians" (Frederik Pohl)
- "Ain't Nothin' But a Hound Dog" (B. W. Clough)
- "Adrift Among the Ghosts" (Jack L. Chalker)
- "Ripples in the Dirac Sea" (Geoffrey A. Landis)

== Awards ==
The anthology placed tenth in the 1990 Locus Poll Award for Best Anthology.

"The Giving Plague" was nominated for the 1989 Hugo Award for Best Short Story and placed fourth in the 1989 Locus Poll Award for Best Short Story.

"Peaches for Mad Molly" was nominated for the 1988 Nebula Award for Best Novelette, the 1989 Analog Award for Best Novella/Novelette, and the 1989 Hugo Award for Best Novelette, and placed fourteenth in the 1989 Locus Poll Award for Best Novelette.

"Schrödinger's Kitten" won the 1988 Nebula Award for Best Novelette, the 1989 SF Chronicle Award for Best Novelette, the 1989 Hugo Award for Best Best Novelette, and the 1989 Theodore Sturgeon Memorial Award, and placed fifth in the 1989 Locus Poll Award for Best Novelette.

"The Flies of Memory" placed eighteenth in the 1989 Locus Poll Award for Best Novella.

"Waiting for the Olympians" was nominated for the 1989 Asimov's Readers' Poll Award for Best Novella and placed thirteenth in the 1989 Locus Poll Award for Best Novella.

"Ripples in the Dirac Sea" was nominated for the 1989 Nebula Award for Best Short Story, the 1989 Asimov's Readers' Poll Award for Best Short Story, the 1989 Hugo Award for Best Short Story, and the 1989 SF Chronicle Award for Best Short Story, and placed eleventh in the 1989 Locus Poll Award for Best Short Story.
