= The 1972 Annual World's Best SF =

1972 anthology edited by Donald A. Wollheim and Arthur W. Saha

- First edition cover, 1972
- Editors: Donald A. Wollheim and Arthur W. Saha
- Cover artist: John Schoenherr
- Language: English
- Series: The Annual World’s Best SF
- Genre: Science fiction
- Publisher: DAW Books
- Publication date: 1972
- Publication place: United States
- Media type: Print (paperback)
- Pages: 302
- Preceded by: World's Best Science Fiction: 1971
- Followed by: The 1973 Annual World's Best SF

The 1972 Annual World's Best SF is an anthology of science fiction short stories edited by Donald A. Wollheim and Arthur W. Saha, the initial volume in a series of nineteen. It was one of two follow-up volumes to the previous year's World's Best Science Fiction: 1971 edited by Wollheim and Terry Carr for Ace Books, the other being Carr's The Best Science Fiction of the Year. The Wollheim/Saha title was first published in paperback by DAW Books in May 1972, followed by a hardcover edition issued in July of the same year by the same publisher as a selection of the Science Fiction Book Club. For the hardcover edition, the original cover art of John Schoenherr was replaced by a new painting by Frank Frazetta. The paperback edition was reissued by DAW in December 1977 under the variant title Wollheim's World's Best SF: Series One, this time with cover art by John Berkey.

The book collects fourteen novelettes and short stories by various science fiction authors, with an introduction by Wollheim. Most of the stories were previously published in 1970-1971 in the magazines The Magazine of Fantasy & Science Fiction, Galaxy Magazine, Analog, Playboy, and If, the anthologies Quark/4, Orbit 8, Orbit 9, and New Writings in SF 19, and the collection In the Pocket: And Other SF Stories / Gather in the Hall of the Planets. One story was first published in this anthology.

== Contents ==
- "Introduction" (Donald A. Wollheim)
- "The Fourth Profession" (Larry Niven)
- "Gleepsite" (Joanna Russ)
- "The Bear with the Knot on His Tail" (Stephen Tall)
- "The Sharks of Pentreath" (Michael G. Coney)
- "A Little Knowledge" (Poul Anderson)
- "Real-Time World" (Christopher Priest)
- "All Pieces of a River Shore" (R. A. Lafferty) (Originally published in 1970)
- "With Friends Like These . . ." (Alan Dean Foster)
- "Aunt Jennie's Tonic" (Leonard Tushnet)
- "Timestorm" (Eddy C. Bertin)
- "Transit of Earth" (Arthur C. Clarke)
- "Gehenna" (K. M. O'Donnell)
- "One Life, Furnished in Early Poverty" (Harlan Ellison) (Originally published in 1970)
- "Occam's Scalpel" (Theodore Sturgeon)

== Awards ==
"The Fourth Profession" was nominated for the 1972 Hugo Award for Best Novella.

"The Bear with the Knot on His Tail" was nominated for the 1972 Hugo Award for Best Short Story, and placed seventh in the Locus Poll Award for Best Short Fiction.
