= The 1988 Annual World's Best SF =

1988 anthology edited by Donald A. Wollheim and Arthur W. Saha

- Cover of first edition, 1988
- Editors: Donald A. Wollheim and Arthur W. Saha
- Cover artist: Blair Wilkins
- Language: English
- Series: The Annual World’s Best SF
- Genre: Science fiction
- Publisher: DAW Books
- Publication date: 1988
- Publication place: United States
- Media type: Print (paperback)
- Pages: 303
- ISBN: 0-88677-281-8
- Preceded by: The 1987 Annual World's Best SF
- Followed by: The 1989 Annual World's Best SF

The 1988 Annual World's Best SF is an anthology of science fiction short stories edited by Donald A. Wollheim and Arthur W. Saha, the seventeenth volume in a series of nineteen. It was first published in paperback by DAW Books in June 1988, followed by a hardcover edition issued in August of the same year by the same publisher as a selection of the Science Fiction Book Club. For the hardcover edition the original cover art by Blair Wilkins was replaced by a new cover painting by Richard Powers.

The book collects ten novellas, novelettes and short stories by various science fiction authors, with an introduction by Wollheim. The stories were previously published in 1987 in the magazines Playboy, Isaac Asimov's Science Fiction Magazine, Omni, and Analog Science Fiction and Fact, and the anthologies Other Edens and Universe 17.

== Contents ==
- "Introduction" (Donald A. Wollheim)
- "The Pardoner's Tale" (Robert Silverberg)
- "Rachel in Love" (Pat Murphy)
- "America" (Orson Scott Card)
- "Crying in the Rain" (Tanith Lee)
- "The Sun Spider" (Lucius Shepard)
- "Angel" (Pat Cadigan)
- "Forever Yours, Anna" (Kate Wilhelm)
- "Second Going" (James Tiptree, Jr.)
- "Dinosaurs" (Walter Jon Williams)
- "All Fall Down" (Don Sakers)

== Awards ==
The anthology placed eleventh in the 1989 Locus Poll Award for Best Anthology.

"The Pardoner's Tale" placed thirteenth in the 1988 Locus Poll Award for Best Short Story.

"Rachel in Love" won the 1987 Nebula Award for Best Novelette, the 1988 Asimov's Readers' Poll Award for Best Novelette, and the 1988 Theodore Sturgeon Memorial Award, placed first in the 1988 Locus Poll Award for Best Novelette, and was nominated for the 1988 Hugo Award for Best Novelette and the 1988 SF Chronicle Award for Best Novelette.

"America" placed sixth in the 1988 Locus Poll Award for Best Novelette.

"Crying in the Rain" placed twenty-sixth in the 1988 Locus Poll Award for Best Short Story.

"The Sun Spider" placed seventeenth in the 1988 Locus Poll Award for Best Novelette.

"Angel" placed first in the 1988 Locus Poll Award for Best Short Story, and was nominated for the 1987 Nebula Award for Best Short Story, the 1988 Asimov's Readers' Poll Award for Best Short Story, the 1988 Hugo Award for Best Short Story, the 1988 World Fantasy Award for Best Short Fiction, and the 1988 SF Chronicle Award for Best Short Story.

"Forever Yours, Anna" won the 1987 Nebula Award for Best Short Story, was nominated for the 1988 Hugo Award for Best Short Story and the 1988 SF Chronicle Award for Best Short Story, and placed eighth in the 1988 Locus Poll Award for Best Short Story.

"Second Going" placed twenty-third in the 1988 Locus Poll Award for Best Novelette.

"Dinosaurs" was nominated for the 1988 Asimov's Readers' Poll Award for Best Novelette, the 1988 Hugo Award for Best Novelette and the 1988 Theodore Sturgeon Memorial Award, and placed eleventh in the 1988 Locus Poll Award for Best Novelette.
