= The Year's Best Fantasy Stories: 8 =

1982 anthology edited by Arthur W. Saha

- Cover art from the first edition
- Editor: Arthur W. Saha
- Cover artist: Oliviero Berni
- Language: English
- Series: The Year's Best Fantasy Stories
- Genre: Fantasy
- Publisher: DAW Books
- Publication date: 1982
- Publication place: United States
- Media type: Print (paperback)
- Pages: 191
- ISBN: 0-87997-770-1
- OCLC: 8803930
- LC Class: CPB Box no. 2744 vol. 19
- Preceded by: The Year's Best Fantasy Stories: 7
- Followed by: The Year's Best Fantasy Stories: 9

The Year's Best Fantasy Stories: 8 is an anthology of fantasy stories, edited by Arthur W. Saha. It was first published in paperback by DAW Books in 1982.

== Summary ==
The book collects eleven novelettes and short stories by various fantasy authors, originally published in 1981 (aside from Lee's, which first appeared in 1980) and deemed by the editor the best from the period represented, together with an introduction by the editor.

== Contents ==
- "Introduction" (Arthur W. Saha)
- "Unicorn Variation" (Roger Zelazny)
- "The Belonging Kind" (William Gibson and John Shirley)
- "Skirmish on Bastable Street" (Bob Leman)
- "The River Maid" (Jane Yolen)
- "The Only Death in the City" (C. J. Cherryh)
- "A Friend in Need" (Lisa Tuttle)
- "Midas Night" (Sam Wilson)
- "The Quickening" (Michael Bishop)
- "When the Clock Strikes" (Tanith Lee)
- "A Pattern of Silver Strings" (Charles de Lint)
- "Pooka's Bridge" (Gillian Fitzgerald)
