= Tintagel (novel) =

1981 novel by Paul H. Cook

Tintangel is a novel by Paul H. Cook published in 1981.

== Plot summary ==
Tintagel is a novel in which people who lose themselves in music will disappear and reappear in a different parallel universe.

== Reception ==
Greg Costikyan reviewed Tintagel in Ares Magazine #13 and commented that "I cannot blankly approve or disapprove Tintagel. I enjoyed reading it, but it contains a number of logical errors – and never seems quite to click."

== Reviews ==
- Review by Tom Easton (1982) in Analog Science Fiction/Science Fact, June 1982
- Review by David Truesdale (1983) in Thrust, #19, Winter/Spring 1983
