= The Year's Best Fantasy Stories: 12 =

1986 anthology edited by Arthur W. Saha

- Cover art from the first edition
- Author: Arthur W. Saha (editor)
- Cover artist: Julek Heller
- Language: English
- Series: The Year's Best Fantasy Stories
- Genre: Fantasy
- Publisher: DAW Books
- Publication date: 1986
- Publication place: United States
- Media type: Print (paperback)
- Pages: 226 pp
- ISBN: 0-88677-163-3
- Preceded by: The Year's Best Fantasy Stories: 11
- Followed by: The Year's Best Fantasy Stories: 13

The Year's Best Fantasy Stories: 12 is an anthology of fantasy stories, edited by Arthur W. Saha. It was first published in paperback by DAW Books in November, 1986.

== Summary ==
The book collects eleven novelettes and short stories by various fantasy authors, originally published in 1985 and deemed by the editor the best from the period represented, together with an introduction by the editor. It includes Ellison's Locus Poll Award winning story "Paladin of the Lost Hour."

== Contents ==
- "Introduction" (Arthur W. Saha)
- "Unferno" (George Alec Effinger)
- "Dinner in Audoghast" (Bruce Sterling)
- "Fortunes of a Fool" (Nicholas V. Yermakov)
- "Preliminary Notes on the Jang" (Lisa Goldstein)
- "The Red House" (Robert R. McCammon)
- "Flight" (Peter Dickinson)
- "The Castle at World’s End" (Chris Naylor)
- "The Persistence of Memory" (Gael Baudino)
- "The Face in the Cloth" (Jane Yolen)
- "The Last Dragon Master" (A. A. Attanasio)
- "Paladin of the Lost Hour" (Harlan Ellison)
