= The Year's Best Fantasy Stories: 11 =

1985 anthology edited by Arthur W. Saha

- Cover art from the first edition
- Author: Arthur W. Saha (editor)
- Cover artist: Vicente Segrelles
- Language: English
- Series: The Year's Best Fantasy Stories
- Genre: Fantasy
- Publisher: DAW Books
- Publication date: 1985
- Publication place: United States
- Media type: Print (paperback)
- Pages: 238 pp
- ISBN: 0-88677-097-1
- OCLC: 82982205
- Preceded by: The Year's Best Fantasy Stories: 10
- Followed by: The Year's Best Fantasy Stories: 12

The Year's Best Fantasy Stories: 11 is an anthology of fantasy stories, edited by Arthur W. Saha. It was first published in paperback by DAW Books in November, 1985.

== Summary ==
The book collects thirteen novelettes and short stories by various fantasy authors, originally published in 1984 and deemed by the editor the best from the period represented, together with an introduction by the editor. It includes one posthumously published work (the story by Smith).

== Contents ==
- "Introduction" (Arthur W. Saha)
- "Draco, Draco" (Tanith Lee)
- "Harvest Child" (Steve Rasnic Tem)
- "Love Among the Xoids" (John Sladek)
- "Stoneskin" (John Morressy)
- "Unmistakably the Finest" (Scott Bradfield)
- "The Foxwife" (Jane Yolen)
- "Golden Apples of the Sun" (originally published as "Virgin Territory") (Gardner R. Dozois, Jack M. Dann and Michael Swanwick)
- "My Rose and My Glove" (Harvey Jacobs)
- "Strange Shadows" (Clark Ashton Smith)
- "A Little Two-Chair Barber Shop on Phillips Street" (Donald R. Burleson)
- "Taking Heart" (Stephen L. Burns)
- "The Storm" (David Morrell)
- "A Cabin on the Coast" (Gene Wolfe)
