= Upon the Winds of Yesterday and Other Explorations =

- Dust-jacket from the first edition
- Author: George Barr
- Illustrator: George Barr
- Cover artist: George Barr
- Language: English
- Subject: George Barr
- Publisher: Donald M. Grant, Publisher, Inc.
- Publication date: 1976
- Publication place: United States
- Media type: Print (Hardback)
- Pages: 140 pp
- OCLC: 4882835

Upon the Winds of Yesterday and Other Explorations is a collection of paintings by George Barr. It was published in 1976 by Donald M. Grant, Publisher, Inc. in an edition of 2,500 copies. The book was released in commemoration of Barr being a Guest of Honor at the 34th World Science Fiction Convention.

== Contents ==
- Foreword, by Tim Kirk
- Introduction, by Stuart David Schiff
- Illustrations
- Afterword, by George Barr
