= The DAW Science Fiction Reader =

1976 anthology of science fiction stories

- Cover from the first paperback edition
- Editor: Donald A. Wollheim
- Language: English
- Genre: Science fiction
- Publisher: DAW Books
- Publication date: 1976
- Publication place: United States
- Media type: Print (paperback)
- Pages: 207

The DAW Science Fiction Reader is an anthology of science fiction stories, edited by Donald A. Wollheim. It was first published in paperback by DAW Books in July, 1976. It was the 200th title from DAW, and was intended to mark that milestone by showcasing the work of some of the publisher's most popular authors. The title consciously reprised that of the Avon Science Fiction Reader, a short-lived digest-sized magazine Wollheim had edited while employed by Avon Books in the 1950s.

== Summary ==
The book collects seven works by various science fiction authors, including a novel by Andre Norton and novelettes and short stories by the remaining authors, together with a general introduction by the editor and an introduction to the Norton piece by its author.

== Contents ==
- "Introduction" (Donald A. Wollheim)
- "Author’s Introduction to This Edition of Fur Magic" (Andre Norton)
- Fur Magic (Andre Norton)
- "Warrior" (Gordon R. Dickson)
- "The Truce" (Tanith Lee)
- "Wizard of Scorpio" (Alan Burt Akers)
- "The Martian El Dorado of Parker Wintley" (Lin Carter)
- "The Day of the Butterflies" (Marion Zimmer Bradley)
- "Captain Fagan Died Alone" (Brian M. Stableford)
