= The Year's Best Fantasy Stories: 13 =

1987 anthology edited by Arthur W. Saha

- Cover art from the first edition
- Author: Arthur W. Saha (editor)
- Cover artist: Dan Horne
- Language: English
- Series: The Year's Best Fantasy Stories
- Genre: Fantasy
- Publisher: DAW Books
- Publication date: 1987
- Publication place: United States
- Media type: Print (paperback)
- Pages: 238 pp
- ISBN: 0-88677-233-8
- OCLC: 17364890
- Preceded by: The Year's Best Fantasy Stories: 12
- Followed by: The Year's Best Fantasy Stories: 14

The Year's Best Fantasy Stories: 13 is an anthology of fantasy stories, edited by Arthur W. Saha. It was first published in paperback by DAW Books in November 1987.

== Summary ==
The book collects eleven novelettes and short stories by various fantasy authors, originally published in 1986 and deemed by the editor the best from the period represented, together with an introduction by the editor.

== Contents ==
- "Introduction" (Arthur W. Saha)
- "Beauty Is the Beast" (Tanith Lee)
- "Something in the Blood" (Richard L. Purtill)
- "Pièce de Résistance" (Judith Tarr)
- "Long, Long Ago" (R. Chetwynd-Hayes)
- "The Old Man and the Cherry Tree" (Kevin J. Anderson)
- "Phone Repairs" (Nancy Kress)
- "The Tale and Its Master" (Michael Rutherford)
- "Sanctuary" (Kim Antieau)
- "The Uncorking of Uncle Finn" (Jane Yolen)
- "A Place to Stay for a Little While" (Jim Aikin)
- "The Boy Who Plaited Manes" (Nancy Springer)
