= Leviathan's Deep =

1979 novel by Jayge Carr

First edition (publ. Doubleday) Cover art by Ron DiScenza

Leviathan's Deep is a novel by Jayge Carr published in 1979.

== Plot summary ==
Leviathan's Deep is a novel in which humanoid aliens from a planet with a matriarchal society resist the cultural assimilation attempted by the patriarchal Terrans.

== Reception ==
Kirkus Reviews states "Thematically erratic [...] but when it's good, it's very good."

Greg Costikyan reviewed Leviathan's Deep in Ares Magazine #6 and commented that "The result is a gripping and powerful novel, portending good things to come from a remarkable novelist."

== Reviews ==
- Review by Paul Kincaid (1980) in Vector 98.
