= The Gem in the Tower =

- Short story by L. Sprague de Camp and Lin Carter
- Country: United States
- Language: English
- Genre: Fantasy

Publication
- Published in: Conan the Swordsman
- Publication type: Collection
- Publisher: Bantam Books
- Media type: Print (Paperback)
- Publication date: 1978
- Series: Conan the Barbarian

"The Gem in the Tower" is a short story by American writers L. Sprague de Camp and Lin Carter, featuring the fictional sword and sorcery hero Conan the Barbarian created by Robert E. Howard. It is a rewritten version of "Black Moonlight", an earlier story by Carter alone featuring his own sword and sorcery character Thongor (for which see below). The Conan version was first published by Bantam Books in the paperback collection Conan the Swordsman in August 1978, and was reprinted in the anthology The Year's Best Fantasy Stories: 5 (DAW Books, 1980) and later editions of Conan the Swordsman (Ace Books, 1987 and 1991, Tor Books (first hardcover edition), 2002). The collection was later gathered together with Conan the Liberator and Conan and the Spider God into the omnibus collection Sagas of Conan (Tor Books, 2004). The story has also been translated into Italian and French.

== Plot summary ==
Conan, as second mate of Gonzago's freebooters, participates in his voyage to a nameless island off the coast of Stygia to steal a mystical jewel guarded by Siptah, an evil sorcerer. The expedition immediately goes wrong, with its own magician Mena and Gonzago himself both killed. Conan is left in command to battle Siptah's winged demon and discovers a secret while inside the sorcerer's tower.

== Adaptation ==
The story was adapted by Roy Thomas, John Buscema and Tony DeZuniga in Savage Sword of Conan #45, October 1979.

== Thongor version ==
The Thongor version, written by Lin Carter alone, originally appeared as "Black Moonlight", and was first published in the magazine Fantastic in the issue for November 1976, It was reprinted in the anthology The Year's Best Fantasy Stories: 3 (DAW Books, 1977). This version of the story has also been translated into German and Italian.

In the story, Thongor guides his pirates towards the haunted island of Zosk, in order to locate the blood pearls of a lost civilization. His scout ends up dead. Thongor finds him, after searching by himself in the lush jungle. The dying man writes a warning about black moonlight in the sand. Thongor travels on and discovers a pool containing the legendary pearls. He is attacked and captured by a tribe of beastmen, the survivors of an ancient race. Soon, Thongor is restrained over an altar as a high priest casts a spell using his mystical sceptre. The spell reverses the sky so that the stars are black and the sky is white. A tall pillar of obsidian is transformed by the magical light, becoming a titanic beast of stone. The creature is about to crush Thongor, when his comrades arrive and free him. Thongor and his crew begin a fearsome battle against the beastmen. Suddenly, the priest orders for his giant to crush the pirates. However, Thongor knocks him off his perch and steals the priest's scepter, which he throws at the giant. A jewel inside the scepter is shattered, ending the spell and the giant's life. The creature slowly crumbles into rubble and covers the priest. The pirates leave Zosk, disappointed after finding no treasure. Thongor cheers them up, taking three handfuls of pearls from his satchel where he hid them.

| Preceded by "Drums of Tombalku" | Complete Conan Saga (William Galen Gray chronology) | Succeeded by Conan and the Grim Grey God |
