= Vadim Shefner =

Russian poet and author (1915-2002

Vadim Sergeyevich Shefner (Russian: Вади́м Серге́евич Ше́фнер); (December 30, 1914 (January 12, 1915) - January 5, 2002) was a Soviet and Russian poet and writer. He started publishing poetry in 1936 and his first poetry collection was published in 1940. He turned to humorous and philosophical science fiction in the early 1960s, but continued publishing non-genre fiction and poetry.

== Works ==
- "The Friar of Chikola" and "A Provincial's Wings", tr. Helen Saltz Jacobson, in New Soviet Science Fiction, New York, Macmillan, 1979, ISBN 0-02-578220-7
- The Unman, New York, Collier Books, 1981, ISBN 0-02-610060-6, 233p. Includes:
  - The Unman (Chelovek s piatiyu ne), trs. Alice Stone Nakhimovsky and Alexander Nakhimovsky
  - Kovrigin’s chronicles (Devushka u obryva), tr. Antonina W. Bouis
- "A Modest Genius: A Fairy Tale for Grown-Ups" ("Skromny geniy"), in:
  - Russian Science Fiction 1969, ed. Robert Magidoff, New York Univ. Press, 1969, pp. 83–100.
  - View from Another Shore, ed. Franz Rottensteiner, New York, Seabury Press, 1973, ISBN 0-8164-9151-8 Second edition Liverpool, Liverpool University Press, 1999, ISBN 0-85323-932-0 and ISBN 0-85323-942-8
  - The 1974 Annual World's Best SF, ed. Donald A. Wollheim, DAW, 1974, pp. 93–107.
