= The Year's Best Fantasy Stories: 10 =

1984 anthology edited by Arthur W. Saha

- Cover art from the first edition
- Author: Arthur W. Saha (editor)
- Cover artist: Jim Burns
- Language: English
- Series: The Year's Best Fantasy Stories
- Genre: Fantasy
- Publisher: DAW Books
- Publication date: 1984
- Publication place: United States
- Media type: Print (paperback)
- Pages: 254 pp
- ISBN: 0-87997-963-1
- OCLC: 11424843
- Preceded by: The Year's Best Fantasy Stories: 9
- Followed by: The Year's Best Fantasy Stories: 11

The Year's Best Fantasy Stories: 10 is an anthology of fantasy stories, edited by Arthur W. Saha. It was first published in paperback by DAW Books in October, 1984.

== Summary ==
The book collects eleven novelettes and short stories by various fantasy authors, originally published in 1983 and deemed by the editor the best from the period represented, together with an introduction by the editor. Of the stories included Wu's "Wong's Lost & Found Emporium" was a Hugo, Nebula and World Fantasy Award nominee, and Tiptree's "Beyond the Dead Reef" won the Locus Poll Award.

== Contents ==
- "Introduction" (Arthur W. Saha)
- "Blue Vase of Ghosts" (Tanith Lee)
- "She Sells Sea Shells" (Paul Darcy Boles)
- "Green Roses" (Larry Tritten)
- "Wong’s Lost and Found Emporium" (William F. Wu)
- "Huggins’ World" (Ennis Duling)
- "The Curse of the Smalls and the Stars" (Fritz Leiber)
- "The Silent Cradle" (Leigh Kennedy)
- "Into Whose Hands" (Karl Edward Wagner)
- "Like a Black Dandelion" (John Alfred Taylor)
- "The Hills Behind Hollywood High" (Avram Davidson and Grania Davis)
- "Beyond the Dead Reef" (James Tiptree, Jr.)
