= The Year's Best Fantasy Stories: 9 =

1983 anthology edited by Arthur W. Saha

- Cover art from the first edition
- Author: Arthur W. Saha (editor)
- Cover artist: Sanjulián
- Language: English
- Series: The Year's Best Fantasy Stories
- Genre: Fantasy
- Publisher: DAW Books
- Publication date: 1983
- Publication place: United States
- Media type: Print (paperback)
- Pages: 192 pp
- ISBN: 0-87997-864-3
- OCLC: 10052825
- Preceded by: The Year's Best Fantasy Stories: 8
- Followed by: The Year's Best Fantasy Stories: 10

The Year's Best Fantasy Stories: 9 is an anthology of fantasy stories, edited by Arthur W. Saha. It was first published in paperback by DAW Books in 1983.

== Summary ==
The book collects ten novelettes and short stories by various fantasy authors, originally published in 1982 and deemed by the editor the best from the period represented, together with an introduction by the editor.

== Contents ==
- "Introduction" (Arthur W. Saha)
- "Another Orphan" (John Kessel)
- "Square and Above Board" (R. A. Lafferty)
- "The Horror on the #33" (Michael Shea)
- "Djinn, No Chaser" (Harlan Ellison)
- "Sentences" (Richard Christian Matheson)
- "Influencing the Hell Out of Time and Teresa Golowitz" (Parke Godwin)
- "'Other'" (Jor Jennings)
- "The Malaysian Mer" (Jane Yolen)
- "Lest Levitation Come Upon Us" (Suzette Haden Elgin)
- "Mirage and Magia" (Tanith Lee)
