= George Barr (artist) =

American artist (1937–2025)

- The Year's Best Fantasy Stories: 2 published by DAW Books, cover by Barr, 1976
- Born: January 30, 1937; Tucson, Arizona, U.S.
- Died: April 19, 2025 (aged 88); Livermore, California, U.S.
- Occupations: Artist, writer
- Known for: Fantasy art

George Edward Barr (January 30, 1937 – April 19, 2025) was an American science fiction and fantasy artist.

== Early life and education ==
George Barr was born in Tucson, Arizona, on January 30, 1937, and grew up in Salt Lake City. His parents related that Barr started drawing at age 2 after his older sister was complimented on drawings she had done in kindergarten. At age 13, he became a fan of science fiction when his father brought home a copy of Amazing Stories.

While in high school, Barr studied art under prominent local landscape artist Jack Vigo; after graduation, he took a commercial art class, but found little value because the class concentrated on only the commercial art skills that would be needed in the Salt Lake City market, while Barr dreamed of creating science fiction and fantasy-themed art. Feeling he would come to regret doing something less than what he wanted, Barr quit the class before it ended.

== Career ==
In 1959, at age 22, Barr sent a painting to Ziff Davis that he thought might make a good cover, but received a reply from Ciel Goldsmith at the publishing house that changes would have to be made. Barr took this as a rejection, but when Goldsmith saw another of his paintings at a local science fiction convention, she explained that that she was willing to buy both paintings if a few changes could be made. Barr made the changes, and both were used as covers for Fantastic Stories. For several years, Barr displayed and sold his artwork at regional science fiction conventions and at the annual World Science Fiction Convention.

Barr moved to Los Angeles in 1968 and did some commercial art work, but quickly lost interest in it, commenting, "A person would say, 'Here is what you draw and how you draw it.' It wasn't anything I could claim as my own or take pride in."

Barr's career started to take off when he moved to San Jose, California, in 1968. Barr eventually supplied both cover art and interior art to Ballantine Books, Ace Books, Leisure Books, Newcastle Books, Forgotten Fantasies, DAW Books, Asimov's Science Fiction, Amazing Stories, Pulphouse Publishing, Donald M. Grant, Underwood–Miller, Alyson Books, Strawberry Hill Books, Arbor House, Weird Tales and TSR. The latter included 1987's Dragonlance Adventures, the Dungeon Master's Design Kit, and several books in the Advanced Dungeons & Dragons Adventure Gamebooks line. In 1997, Marion Zimmer Bradley's Fantasy Magazine noted that Barr had contributed artwork to all but six of its first 34 issues.

Barr's illustration for "The Perils of Nicolina" published in Amazing Stories in 1994

A collection of his professional fantasy and science fiction paintings, Upon the Winds of Yesterday and Other Explorations, was published by Donald M. Grant in 1976 with a limited press run of only 2,500 copies, which quickly sold out. The book debuted at MidAmeriCon, the 34th World Science Fiction Convention, where Barr was the convention's Fan Guest of Honor, along with Robert A. Heinlein, who was the convention's professional writer Guest of Honor. Barr provided the art for the full color wrap-around dust jacket for the convention's hardcover program book.

Over the next twenty years, Barr was invited to be the guest of honor at eleven science fiction conventions. When he was honored as Professional Artist Guest of Honor at the 1994 World Science Fiction Convention in Winnipeg, Barr became the first person to be invited to Worldcon as a both Fan Guest of Honor (1976) and Professional Guest of Honor (1994). Barr also wrote a number of short stories during his life as well as a fantasy novella titled The Lost One.

== Style ==
Barr's work has been characterized as being influenced by Arthur Rackham, Hannes Bok and Virgil Finlay, and was often romantic and whimsical. Barr used an unusual layered technique, first pencilling in the drawing very lightly, then redrawing it with black ball-point pen complete with tonal variations. The colors were then painted in, "almost as if doing a coloring-book exercise", as Barr noted.

== Personal life and death ==
Barr lived with his partner and fellow artist James Bearcloud in San Jose, until Bearcloud's death in 2009. Barr died on April 19, 2025, at age 88.

== Reception ==
The Encyclopedia of Science Fiction describes him as one of the least appreciated SF/fantasy artists.

Randy Broecker, in his 2001 book Fantasy of the 20th Century, noted the invigorating covers of the series of Conan the Barbarian books published by Donald M. Grant in the 1970s, and wrote that "One of the best was Red Nails (1975), illustrated by award-winning artist George Barr". Broecker also called Barr's cover for Jack Vance's The Dying Earth (1976) another notable work, and complimented Barr for his "wonderful paintings" for DAW Books in the 1970s.

Jon Gustafson, writing in Science Fiction Review, commented, "George Barr is too humble ... [I] am convinced that he simply doesn't realize how good he is ... [For the cover of The Book of Fritz Leiber], what George has done is assemble a number of elements from the stories and place them together in a unique still-life. The basic colors are eye-catching reds, golds, and ivory, and the ground is a very dark violet (almost black) ... The overall effect is pleasing to the eye, despite the bright colors used ... The details are carefully delineated, as are the details in Leiber's stories, and the matching of artistic and literary styles is perfect."

Richard E. Geis reviewed the book of Barr's art published by Donald M. Grant Publishing in 1976, and was very impressed, writing, "Upon the Winds of Yesterday And Other Explorations: The Paintings of George Barr is absolutely exquisite! This man is superb, and Donald M. Grant has given him a perfect display ... This edition is limited to 2500 copies, and costs $20. Believe me, it is worth it. Get one while they last."

Reviewing the first few issues of the fanzine AMRA, Norm Metcalfe noted that "#7 has some artwork which stands heads and shoulders over the previous issues. George Barr is responsible for much of the gain."

William Rotsler wrote, "The truth is that George has a unique talent and a lot of it. His style is composed of careful, even painstaking craftsmanship, some excellent ideas, a sense of humor, and a dash of madness."

Of his recognition as an artist, Barr said, "If there is a popularity for what I do, it's probably because I paint pretty pictures, because that's what I'm trying to do. I don't shock or startle; I basically paint things that are pretty, that people can get pleasure from."

== Awards ==
From 1970 to 1980, Barr was a finalist or winner of several major fantasy and science fiction art awards.

=== Hugo Awards ===
- Winner, Best Fan Artist, 1967
- Finalist, Best Fan Artist, 1966, 1968, and 1969
- Finalist, Best Professional Artist, 1975 and 1976

=== Locus Awards ===
- Finalist in various categories, 1970–1976 and 1977–1982

=== World Fantasy Awards ===
- Finalist, Best Artist, 1975 and 1976

=== British Fantasy Awards ===
- Finalist, Best Artwork, 1978

== General citation for article ==
- Clute, John; Nicholls, Peter (1995). The Encyclopedia of Science Fiction. New York: St. Martin's Griffin. p. 93. ISBN 0-312-13486-X.
