= Paul Cook (author) =

American author, critic, and lecturer

Paul Cook is an American science fiction writer and classical music critic. He is a Principal Lecturer in the English Department at Arizona State University.

== Works ==
=== Novels ===
Paul Cook has written eight science fiction novels.

- Tintagel (1981). Ace Science Fiction. Finalist for the 1982 Locus Award for Best First Novel.
- The Alejandra Variations (1984). Ace Science Fiction.
- Duende Meadow (1985). Bantam Spectra.
- Halo (1986). Bantam Spectra.
- On The Rim Of The Mandala (1987). Bantam Spectra.
- Fortress On The Sun (1997). Roc SF; Reprint (2008). Phoenix Pick/Arc Manor Books
- The Engines Of Dawn (1999). Roc SF; Reprint (2008). Phoenix Pick/Arc Manor Books
- Karma Kommandos (2008). Phoenix Pick/Arc Manor Books

=== Other writing ===
Paul Cook has published short stories in Amazing Stories, Digital Science Fiction, Isaac Asimov's Science Fiction, The Hawai'i Review, The Magazine of Fantasy and Science Fiction, The Nameless Review, and New Letters. He also writes book reviews for Galaxy's Edge Magazine.

He has published poems in a wide variety of literary non mainstream magazines such as The Georgia Review and Quarterly West.

He has written classical music criticism for such venues as ClassicsToday.com and MusicWeb-International.com, and now writes classical music reviews exclusively for The American Record Guide. He has written extensively on the music of Hindemith, Prokofiev, Shostakovich, and Stravinsky.

He most recently wrote the introduction to the 2006 edition of Edgar Rice Burroughs' novel Tanar of Pellucidar (Bison Books/University of Nebraska Press) and is the Series Editor for the Phoenix Science Fiction Classic series from Phoenix Pick/Arc Manor books.
