= Arthur W. Saha =

American speculative fiction editor and anthologist

Arthur William Saha
- Born: October 31, 1923
- Died: November 19, 1999 (aged 76)
- Education: Columbia University
- Occupations: Editor, anthologist

Arthur William Saha (October 31, 1923 – November 19, 1999) was an American speculative fiction editor and anthologist, closely associated with publisher Donald A. Wollheim.

== Life ==
Saha was the son of William and Henrikka Saha, a Finnish-American couple. His cousin was Marjatta Rasi, who represented Finland as Permanent Representative to the United Nations (UN), and served as Ambassador to many countries posted at New Delhi, Dhaka, Colombo, Kathmandu, Thimphu, and Vienna. After serving in the Merchant Marine during World War II, Saha enrolled in and graduated from Columbia University. Saha worked as a research chemist and is credited with the patent for the first fire resistant ironing board cover, and for various paints and pigments used on the exteriors of the first space satellites. At one time he was a resident of Minnesota; in his later years Saha resided in Cooperstown, Otsego County, New York. While living in New York City, he was an early associate of the beatniks. Saha was a long-standing member of Mensa. He died of cancer.

== Career in speculative fiction ==
Saha became active in New York City science fiction fandom, becoming a member of the Futurians and First Fandom, and was a close associate and ally of Wollheim and Frederik Pohl in the early fan wars.

Later an editor at Wollheim's publishing house DAW Books, Saha co-edited numerous "best of the year" science fiction anthologies with Wollheim, and was Wollheim's choice as successor to Lin Carter as editor of a similar line of fantasy anthologies. Saha's compilations were routinely entered in the Locus Poll Award for Best Anthology; The 1978 Annual World's Best SF he co-edited with Wollheim came in second for the 1979 award.

He was inducted into and received a First Fandom Hall of Fame award for 1992 for his contributions to the field of science fiction. He served as President of the New York Science Fiction Society, better known as the Lunarians, and as President of First Fandom for many years until his death.

== Coinage ==
Saha is credited with coining the term "Trekkie" in 1967 to describe fans of Star Trek. He had used the term in an interview that Pete Hamill was conducting on the science fiction phenomenon for TV Guide.

== Bibliography ==
=== The Annual World's Best SF (with Donald A. Wollheim) ===
- The 1972 Annual World's Best SF (=Wollheim's World's Best SF: Series One) (1972)
- The 1973 Annual World's Best SF (=Wollheim's World's Best SF: Series Two) (1973)
- The 1974 Annual World's Best SF (=Wollheim's World's Best SF: Series Three) (1974)
- The 1975 Annual World's Best SF (=Wollheim's World's Best SF: Series Four) (1975)
- The 1976 Annual World's Best SF (=Wollheim's World's Best SF: Series Five) (1976)
- The 1977 Annual World's Best SF (=Wollheim's World's Best SF: Series Six) (1977)
- The 1978 Annual World's Best SF (=Wollheim's World's Best SF: Series Seven) (1978)
- The 1979 Annual World's Best SF (=Wollheim's World's Best SF: Series Eight) (1979)
- The 1980 Annual World's Best SF (=Wollheim's World's Best SF: Series Nine) (1980)
- The 1981 Annual World's Best SF (1981)
- The 1982 Annual World's Best SF (1982)
- The 1983 Annual World's Best SF (1983)
- The 1984 Annual World's Best SF (1984)
- The 1985 Annual World's Best SF (1985)
- The 1986 Annual World's Best SF (1986)
- The 1987 Annual World's Best SF (1987)
- The 1988 Annual World's Best SF (1988)
- The 1989 Annual World's Best SF (1989)
- The 1990 Annual World's Best SF (1990)

=== The Year's Best Fantasy Stories ===
- The Year's Best Fantasy Stories: 7 (1981)
- The Year's Best Fantasy Stories: 8 (1982)
- The Year's Best Fantasy Stories: 9 (1983)
- The Year's Best Fantasy Stories: 10 (1984)
- The Year's Best Fantasy Stories: 11 (1985)
- The Year's Best Fantasy Stories: 12 (1986)
- The Year's Best Fantasy Stories: 13 (1987)
- The Year's Best Fantasy Stories: 14 (1988)
