= Pat McIntosh =

Scottish writer

- Born: Lanarkshire, Scotland
- Occupation: Author
- Writing career
- Genres: Mystery fiction, fantasy

Pat McIntosh is a Scottish writer of historical mystery fiction and fantasy.

== Life and career ==
McIntosh was born and raised in Lanarkshire, Scotland. Having begun to write at age seven, she credits the author who inspired her to write as "probably Angus MacVicar!" She lived and worked in Glasgow for many years before moving to the west coast of Scotland. Prior to making her mark as an author, she worked as "a librarian, a receptionist for an alternative therapy centre, taught geology and palaeontology, [and] tutored for the Open University." Her first success as a writer came with a string of fantasy short stories published in the series of The Year's Best Fantasy Stories anthologies in the late 1970s, but she is best known as the author of the Gilbert and Alys Cunningham series of historical mysteries set in medieval Scotland, beginning with The Harper's Quine in 2004. The books have been published by Constable & Robinson in the United Kingdom and Carroll & Graf in the United States.

== Bibliography ==
=== Gilbert and Alys Cunningham mysteries ===
1. The Harper's Quine (2004)
2. The Nicholas Feast (2005)
3. The Merchant's Mark (2006)
4. St. Mungo's Robin (2006)
5. The Rough Collier (2008)
6. The Stolen Voice (2009)
7. A Pig of Cold Poison (2010)
8. The Counterfeit Madam (2011)
9. The Fourth Crow (2012)
10. The King's Corrodian (2013)
11. The Lanimer Bride (2016)
- The Gil Cunningham Omnibus (2014; collected edition of books 1-4)

=== Short stories ===
- "Falcon's Mate" (1974)
- "Cry Wolf" (1975)
- "Ring of Black Stone" (1976)
- "The Cloak of Dreams" (1978)
- "Child of Air" (1979)
