= Donald A. Wollheim =

American sci-fi writer, editor, publisher

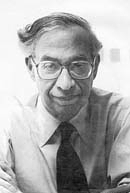
- Wollheim in 1983
- Born: Donald Allen Wollheim; October 1, 1914; New York City, New York, U.S.
- Died: November 2, 1990 (aged 76); New York City, New York, U.S.
- Occupations: Publisher; editor; writer; critic
- Spouse: Elsie Balter
- Children: Elizabeth Rosalind 'Betsy' Wollheim
- Writing career
- Pen name: David Grinnell; Arthur Cooke; Millard Verne Gordon; Martin Pearson; Braxton Wells; Graham Conway; Lawrence Woods; Darrell G. Raynor
- Period: 1934–1990
- Genres: Science fiction, fantasy

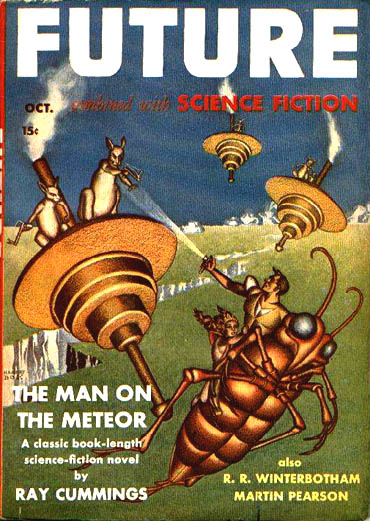
Wollheim's "Pogo Planet", the first installment of his "Alex Calkins" series, was the cover story for the October 1941 issue of Future. It appeared under Wollheim's "Martin Pearson" pseudonym and was illustrated by Hannes Bok.

Donald Allen Wollheim (October 1, 1914 – November 2, 1990) was an American science fiction editor, publisher, writer, and fan. As an author, he published under his own name as well as under pseudonyms, including David Grinnell, Martin Pearson, and Darrell G. Raynor. A founding member of the Futurians, he was a leading influence on science fiction development and fandom in the 20th-century United States. Ursula K. Le Guin called Wollheim "the tough, reliable editor of Ace Books, in the Late Pulpalignean Era, 1966 and '67", which is when he published her first two novels in Ace Double editions.

== Profile ==
=== Involvement in science fiction fandom ===
The 1979 first edition of The Encyclopedia of Science Fiction calls Wollheim "one of the first and most vociferous SF fans." He published numerous fanzines and co-edited the early Fanciful Tales of Time and Space. His importance to early fandom is chronicled in the 1974 book The Immortal Storm by Sam Moskowitz and in the 1977 book The Futurians by Damon Knight.

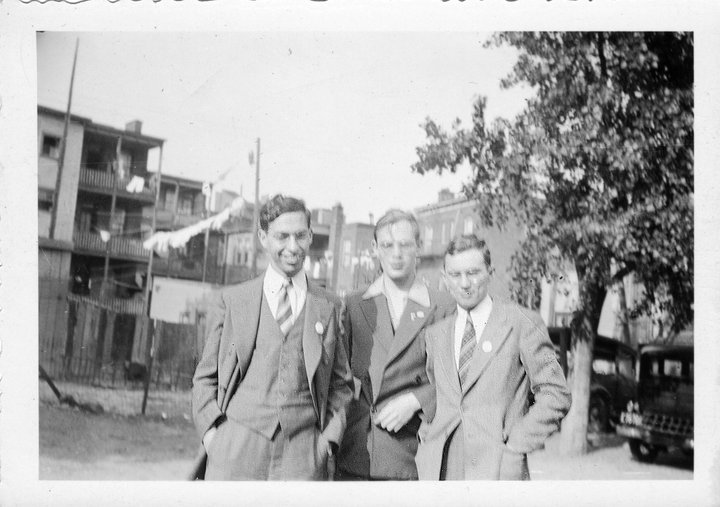
With Frederik Pohl and John Michel, 1938

Wollheim organized an event later considered the first American science fiction convention, when a group from New York met with a group from Philadelphia on October 22, 1936, in Philadelphia. The modern Philcon convention claims descent from this event. Out of this meeting, plans were formed for regional and national meetings, including the first-ever Worldcon.

Wollheim was a member of the New York Science Fiction League, one of the clubs established by Hugo Gernsback to promote science fiction. When payment was not forthcoming for the first story he sold to Gernsback, Wollheim formed a group with several other authors, and successfully sued for payment. He was expelled from the Science Fiction League as "a disruptive influence" but was later reinstated. From the September 1935 issue of Gernsback's Wonder Stories:

THREE MEMBERS EXPELLED It grieves us to announce that we have found the first disloyalty in our organization... These members we expelled on June 12th. Their names are Donald A. Wollheim, John B. Michel, and William S. Sykora—three active fans who just got themselves onto the wrong road.

In 1937 Wollheim founded the Fantasy Amateur Press Association, whose first mailing (July 1937) included this statement from him: "There are many fans desiring to put out a voice who dare not, for fear of being obliged to keep it up, and for the worry and time taken by subscriptions and advertising. It is for them and for the fan who admits it is his hobby and not his business that we formed the FAPA." In 1938, with several friends, he formed the Futurians—arguably the best-known of the science fiction clubs. At one time or another, the membership included Isaac Asimov, Frederik Pohl, Cyril Kornbluth, James Blish, John Michel, Judith Merril, Robert A. W. Lowndes, Richard Wilson, Damon Knight, Virginia Kidd, and Larry T. Shaw. In 1943 Wollheim married fellow Futurian Elsie Balter (1910–1996). It proved to be a lasting marriage and publishing partnership.

The Futurians became less fan-oriented and more professional after 1940. Its conferences and workshops focused on writing, editing, and publishing, with many of its members interested in all three.

=== Work as author ===
Wollheim's first story, "The Man from Ariel", was published in the January 1934 issue of Wonder Stories when he was nineteen.

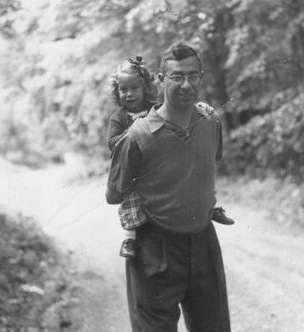
Don Wollheim and his daughter Elizabeth (1954)

He was not paid for the story, and when he learned that other authors had not been paid either, he said so in the Bulletin of the Terrestrial Fantascience Guild. Publisher Hugo Gernsback eventually settled with Wollheim and the other authors out of court for $75. However, when Wollheim submitted another story ("The Space Lens") under the pseudonym Millard Verne Gordon, he was once again cheated by Gernsback who published it in the September 1935 issue. His third known story was published in Fanciful Tales of Time and Space, Fall 1936, a fanzine that he edited himself. That year he also published and edited another short-lived fanzine, Phantagraph.

Wollheim's stories were published regularly from 1940; at the same time he was becoming an important editor. In the 1950s and 60s he wrote chiefly novels. He usually used pseudonyms for works aimed at grownups, and wrote children's novels under his own name. Notable and popular were the eight "Mike Mars" books for children, which explored different facets of the NASA space program. Also well-received were the "Secret" books for young readers: The Secret of Saturn's Rings (1954), Secret of the Martian Moons (1955), and The Secret of the Ninth Planet (1959). As Martin Pearson he published the "Ajax Calkins" series, which became the basis for his novel Destiny's Orbit (1962). A sequel, Destination: Saturn was published in 1967 in collaboration with Lin Carter. The Universe Makers (1971) is a discussion of themes and philosophy in science fiction.

One of Wollheim's short stories, "Mimic", was made into the film of the same name by director and co-writer Guillermo del Toro, released in 1997.

His daughter Betsy declared: "In true editorial fashion, he was honest about the quality of his own writing. He felt it was fair to middling at best. He always knew that his great talent was as an editor."

=== Career as editor and publisher ===
Robert Silverberg said that Wollheim was "one of the most significant figures in 20th century American science fiction publishing," adding, "A plausible case could be made that he was the most significant figure—responsible in large measure for the development of the science fiction paperback, the science fiction anthology, and the whole post-Tolkien boom in fantasy fiction."

In late 1940, Wollheim noticed a new magazine titled Stirring Detective and Western Stories on the newsstands. He wrote to the publishers, Albing Publications, to see if they were interested in adding a science fiction title to their list, and he was invited to meet them. They did not have capital, however, and only guaranteed him a salary if the magazines were successful. He approached some of his fellow Futurians for free stories (some published under pseudonyms to protect their reputations with paying editors). It resulted in Wollheim's editing two of the earliest periodicals devoted to science fiction, the Cosmic Stories and Stirring Science Stories magazines starting in February 1941. After the magazines were cancelled later in 1941, Wollheim was able to find another publisher, Manhattan Fiction Publications, and a fourth issue of Stirring appeared, dated March 1942. Wartime constraints prevented ongoing publication, and there were no more issues of either title.

Wollheim edited the first science fiction anthology to be mass-marketed, The Pocket Book of Science Fiction (1943). It was also the first book containing the words "science fiction" in the title. It included works by Robert A. Heinlein, Theodore Sturgeon, T. S. Stribling, Stephen Vincent Benét, Ambrose Bierce, and H. G. Wells. In 1945 Wollheim edited the first hardcover anthology from a major publisher and the first omnibus, The Viking Portable Novels of Science. He also edited the first anthology of original science fiction, The Girl With the Hungry Eyes (1947), although there is evidence that this last was originally intended to be the first issue of a new magazine.

Ace Double, The Brain Stealers/Atta (1954)

Avon Fantasy Reader No. 10, edited by Wollheim

Between 1947 and 1951 he was editor at the pioneering paperback publisher Avon Books, where he made available highly affordable editions of the works of A. Merritt, H. P. Lovecraft, and C. S. Lewis' Silent Planet space trilogy, bringing these previously little known authors a wide readership. During this period he also edited eighteen issues of the influential Avon Fantasy Reader as well as three of the Avon Science Fiction Reader. These periodicals contained mostly reprints and a few original stories.

In 1952 Wollheim left Avon to work for A. A. Wyn at the Ace Magazine Company and spearheaded a new paperback book list, Ace Books. In 1953 he introduced science fiction to the Ace lineup, and for 20 years as editor-in-chief was responsible for their multi-genre list and, most important to him, their renowned sf list. Wollheim invented the Ace Doubles series which consisted of pairs of books, usually by different authors, bound back-to-back with two "front" covers. Because these paired books had to fit a fixed total page length, one or both were usually abridged to fit, and Wollheim often made other editorial alterations—as witness the differences between Poul Anderson's Ace novel War of the Wing-Men and its definitive revised edition, The Man Who Counts. Among the authors who made their paperback debuts in Ace Doubles were Philip K. Dick, Samuel R. Delany, Leigh Brackett, Ursula K. Le Guin, and John Brunner. William S. Burroughs' first book, Junkie, was published as an Ace Double. Wollheim also helped develop Marion Zimmer Bradley, Robert Silverberg, Avram Davidson, Fritz Leiber, Andre Norton, Thomas Burnett Swann, Jack Vance, and Roger Zelazny, among others. While at Ace, he and co-editor Terry Carr began an annual anthology series, The World's Best Science Fiction, the first collection of what they considered the best of the prior year's short stories, from magazines, hardcovers, paperback collections and other anthologies.

In the early 1960s Ace reintroduced Edgar Rice Burroughs' work, which had long been out of print, and in 1965, Ace bought the paperback rights to Dune (Herbert's title worried Wollheim, who feared it would be mistaken for a western). Eventually, Ace introduced single paperback books and became one of the preeminent genre publishers. Ace and Ballantine dominated sf in the 1960s and built the genre by publishing original material as well as reprints.

==== Tolkien controversy ====
Prior to the 1960s, no large American paperback publisher would publish fiction in the epic fantasy genre. It was believed there was no public demand for this type of fiction. Wollheim published an unauthorized paperback edition of J. R. R. Tolkien's The Lord of the Rings in three volumes. It was the first mass-market paperback edition of Tolkien's epic. Wollheim did not consider himself a fantasy fan, but nonetheless published Tolkien.

In a 2006 interview his daughter, Betsy Wollheim, said:

When he called up Professor Tolkien in 1964 and asked if he could publish Lord of the Rings as Ace paperbacks, Tolkien said he would never allow his great works to appear in so 'degenerate a form' as the paperback book. Don was one of the fathers of the entire paperback industry, since before he spearheaded the Ace line he was the originating editor-in-chief of the Avon paperback list in 1945, so he took this personally. He was very offended. He did a little research and discovered a loophole in the copyright. Houghton Mifflin, Tolkien's American hardcover publisher, had neglected to protect the work in the United States. So, incensed by Tolkien's response, he realized that he could legally publish them and did. This brash action (which ultimately benefited his primary competitors) was really the Big Bang that founded the modern fantasy field, and only someone like my father could have done that. He did pay Tolkien, and he was responsible for making not only Tolkien but Ballantine Books extremely wealthy. He was bitter about that, and frankly that's probably why he never got the Hugo he wanted. But if he hadn't done it, who knows when—or if —those books would have been published in paperback?

This account was disputed by Tolkien, who claimed he never received any communication from Ace prior to publication of their version. In any case, Tolkien had previously authorized paperback editions of The Hobbit and Tree and Leaf. The authorized Ballantine paperback edition of The Lord of the Rings was then published in November 1965. After a campaign organized by Tolkien's American fans, Ace subsequently agreed to cease publishing the unauthorized edition and to pay Tolkien standard royalties for the sales that did occur.

A 1993 court determined the copyright loophole suggested by Ace Books was invalid and its paperback edition was found to have been a violation of copyright under U.S. law. At this time, the U.S. had yet to join the International Copyright Convention, and most laws on the books existed to protect domestic creations from foreign infringement. Houghton Mifflin was technically in violation of the law when they exceeded their import limits and failed to renew their interim copyright. In the Locus obituary for Donald Wollheim, however, more details emerge:

Houghton-Mifflin had imported sheets instead of printing their own edition, but they didn't want to sell paperback rights. Ace printed the first paperback edition and caused such a furor that Tolkien rewrote the books enough to get a new copyright, then sold them to Ballantine. The rest is history. Although Ace and Wollheim have become the villains in the Tolkien publishing gospel, it's probable that the whole Tolkien boom would not have happened if Ace hadn't published them.

=== Foundation of DAW Books ===
Wollheim left Ace in 1971. Frederik Pohl describes the circumstances:

Unfortunately, when Wyn died [in 1968] the company was sold to a consortium headed by a bank. ... Few of them had any publishing experience before they found themselves running Ace. It showed. Before long, bills weren't being paid, authors' advances and royalties were delayed, budgets were cut back, and most of Donald's time was spent trying to soothe authors and agents who were indignant, and had every right to be, at the way they were treated.

DAW Books logo used from 1972 to 1984

Upon leaving Ace, he and his wife, Elsie Balter Wollheim, founded DAW Books, which he named for his initials. DAW can claim to be the first mass market specialist science fiction and fantasy fiction publishing house. DAW issued its first four titles in April 1972. Most of the writers whom he had developed at Ace went with him to DAW: Marion Zimmer Bradley, Andre Norton, Philip K. Dick, John Brunner, A. Bertram Chandler, Kenneth Bulmer, Gordon R. Dickson, A. E. van Vogt, and Jack Vance. In later years, when his distributor, New American Library, threatened to withhold Thomas Burnett Swann's Biblical historical fantasy How Are the Mighty Fallen (1974), owing to its homosexual content, Wollheim fought vigorously against their decision, and they relented.

His later author discoveries included Tanith Lee, Jennifer Roberson, Michael Shea, Tad Williams, Celia S. Friedman, and C. J. Cherryh, whose Downbelow Station (1982) was the first DAW book to win the Hugo Award for best novel. He was also able to give a number of British writers, including E. C. Tubb, Brian Stableford, Barrington Bayley, and Michael Coney, a new American audience. He published translations of international sf as well as anthologies of translated stories, Best From the Rest of the World. With the help of Arthur W. Saha, Wollheim also edited and published the popular "Annual World's Best Science Fiction" anthology from 1971 until his death.

== Recognition ==
Algis Budrys in 1966 gave Wollheim a Galaxy Bookshelf award "for doing his job". Upon Wollheim's death in 1990, the prolific editor Robert Silverberg argued (above) that he may have been "the most significant figure" in American SF publishing.

Robert Jordan credited Wollheim for helping to launch Jordan's career. Wollheim made an offer for Jordan's first novel, Warrior of the Ataii, though he withdrew the offer when Jordan requested some minor changes to the contract. Jordan claimed that Wollheim's first, 'laudatory' letter convinced him that he could write, and so he chose to remember the first letter and forget about the second. The novel remained unpublished during Jordan's lifetime, he Jordan went on to write the immensely successful The Wheel of Time series for Tor Books.

Marion Zimmer Bradley referred to him as "a second father", Frederick Pohl called him "a founder", and Robert Silverberg says he was "seriously underrated" and "one of the great shapers of science-fiction publishing in the United States". In 1977 scholar Robert Scholes named Wollheim "one of the most important editors and publishers of science fiction."

From 1975 on, Wollheim received several special awards for his contributions to science fiction and to fantasy, including one at the 1975 World SF Convention and runner-up to Ian & Betty Ballantine at the 1975 World Fantasy Convention.

The Science Fiction and Fantasy Hall of Fame inducted him in 2002, its seventh class of two deceased and two living persons. He is the third person inducted primarily for his work as editor or publisher, after the inaugural 1996 pair Hugo Gernsback and John W. Campbell.

He was awarded a 2009 Solstice Award (since renamed the Kate Wilhelm Solstice Award) by the SFWA.

== Selected works ==
=== As editor ===
==== World's Best Science Fiction (with Terry Carr) ====
- World's Best Science Fiction: 1965 (also known as World's Best Science Fiction: First Series)
- World's Best Science Fiction: 1966 (also known as World's Best Science Fiction: Second Series)
- World's Best Science Fiction: 1967 (also known as World's Best Science Fiction: Third Series)
- World's Best Science Fiction: 1968 (also known as World's Best Science Fiction: Fourth Series)
- World's Best Science Fiction: 1969
- World's Best Science Fiction: 1970
- World's Best Science Fiction: 1971

==== The Annual World's Best SF (with Arthur W. Saha) ====
- The 1972 Annual World's Best SF (also known as Wollheim's World's Best SF: Series One)
- The 1973 Annual World's Best SF (also known as Wollheim's World's Best SF: Series Two)
- The 1974 Annual World's Best SF (also known as Wollheim's World's Best SF: Series Three)
- The 1975 Annual World's Best SF (also known as Wollheim's World's Best SF: Series Four)
- The 1976 Annual World's Best SF (also known as Wollheim's World's Best SF: Series Five)
- The 1977 Annual World's Best SF (also known as Wollheim's World's Best SF: Series Six)
- The 1978 Annual World's Best SF (also known as Wollheim's World's Best SF: Series Seven)
- The 1979 Annual World's Best SF (also known as Wollheim's World's Best SF: Series Eight)
- The 1980 Annual World's Best SF (also known as Wollheim's World's Best SF: Series Nine)
- The 1981 Annual World's Best SF
- The 1982 Annual World's Best SF
- The 1983 Annual World's Best SF
- The 1984 Annual World's Best SF
- The 1985 Annual World's Best SF
- The 1986 Annual World's Best SF
- The 1987 Annual World's Best SF
- The 1988 Annual World's Best SF
- The 1989 Annual World's Best SF
- The 1990 Annual World's Best SF

==== Others ====
- The DAW Science Fiction Reader (1976)

=== As writer ===
==== Mike Mars series ====
1. Mike Mars, Astronaut (1961)
2. Mike Mars Flies the X-15 (1961)
3. Mike Mars at Cape Canaveral (renamed Mike Mars at Cape Kennedy when published in paperback in 1966) (1961)
4. Mike Mars in Orbit (1961)
5. Mike Mars Flies the Dyna-Soar (1962)
6. Mike Mars, South Pole Spaceman (1962)
7. Mike Mars and the Mystery Satellite (1963)
8. Mike Mars Around the Moon (1964)

==== Winston Juveniles ====
- The Secret of Saturn's Rings (1954, Winston Science Fiction series)
- The Secret of the Martian Moons (1955, Winston Science Fiction series)
- The Secret of the Ninth Planet (1959, Winston Science Fiction series)

==== Ajax Calkins ====
- Destiny's Orbit (1961, as David Grinnell)
- Destination: Saturn (1967, as David Grinnell, with Lin Carter)

==== Other novels ====
- One Against the Moon (1956, The World Publishing Company, Library of Congress Catalog Card Number: 56-9261)
- Across Time (1957, as David Grinnell)
- The Edge of Time (1958, as David Grinnell)
- The Martian Missile (1959, as David Grinnell)
- To Venus! To Venus! (1970, as David Grinnell)

==== Nonfiction ====
- A Year Among the Girls (as Darrell G. Raynor) (1966) (concerning his crossdressing experiences and Casa Susanna)
- The Universe Makers: Science Fiction Today (1971): a "survey and behind-the-scenes look" at science fiction from the Golden Age onward))

== Personal life ==
Wollheim also actively practiced cross-dressing as a woman throughout his life, and he regularly attended events at Casa Susanna in the Catskills of upstate New York.

== See also ==
- Ace Double
- Winston Science Fiction

== Sources ==
Carpenter, Humphrey, ed. (2023) [1981]. The Letters of J. R. R. Tolkien: Revised and Expanded Edition. New York: HarperCollins. ISBN 978-0-35-865298-4.
