= Jayge Carr =

American NASA nuclear physicist and science fiction and fantasy author (1940-2006)

Marj Krueger
- Born: Margery Ruth Morgenstern; July 28, 1940; Houston, Texas
- Died: December 20, 2006 (aged 66); Austin, Texas
- Citizenship: United States
- Education: Wayne State University
- Occupation: Author
- Writing career
- Pen name: Jayge Carr
- Language: English
- Period: 1976–2006
- Genres: Science fiction, Fantasy

Jayge Carr is the pen name of American science fiction and fantasy author Margery Ruth Morgenstern Krueger (July 28, 1940 – December 20, 2006), also known as Margery Krueger and Marj Krueger, a former nuclear physicist for NASA. She is best known for her "Rabelais" series.

== Life ==
Carr was born on the 28th of July 1940 in Houston, Texas, where she was also raised. As an adult she lived in Texas and in other states. She studied physics at Carnegie Institute of Technology, Wayne State University, and Case Western Reserve University, which she left before achieving her doctorate to raise a family and write.

On 20 December 2006, Carr died of cancer, leaving a husband, two daughters, two granddaughters, and three sisters. Carr's remains were launched into orbit by Celestis.

== Writing career ==
Carr's first published story, "Alienation" appeared in the science fiction magazine Analog in 1976, and she continued writing through the remainder of her life. She tried to inject a sense of fun into her writing. Regarded by some as a feminist writer, she considered herself more as a "peoplist," dealing with such themes as bigotry and pollution in her fiction.

== Bibliography ==
=== Nonfiction ===
- Ages of Plutonium-Beryllium Neutrons in Tungsten-Water Media (November 1966)

=== Rabelais series ===
- Navigator's Sindrome (1983)
- The Treasure in the Heart of the Maze (1985)
- Rabelaisian Reprise (1988)

=== Other novels ===
- Leviathan's Deep (1979)

=== Short stories ===
- "Alienation" (1976)
- "The Ax" (1977)
- "Right of Passage" (1978)
- "Inky" (1978)
- "In Adam's Fall" (1979)
- "Malthus's Day" (1979)
- "The Pavilion Where All Times Meet" (1979)
- "Sanctuary" (1979)
- "Does Not a Statistic Bleed?" (1979)
- "Star Spats" (1980)
- "The King Is Dead! Long Live -" (1980)
- "Child of the Wandering Sea" (1980)
- "The Selfish Genie" (1980)
- "The False-True Heir" (1980)
- "Hillsong" (1980)
- "Mustard Seed" (1981)
- "Blind Spot" (1981)
- "The Pacifists" (1981)
- "Measurement" (1982)
- "Lungfish" (1982)
- "The Wondrous Works of His Hands" (1982)
- "Reunion" (1982)
- "Hippocampocracy" (1982)
- "The Kidnapped Key" (1983)
- "The Spoils of Victory" (1983)
- "Monolyth" (1983)
- "The Tempest Within" (1983)
- "Pieces of Eight" (1984)
- "The Piper's Pay" (1984)
- "Mudlark and Sky" (1984)
- "The Heart in the Egg" (1984)
- "Webrider" (1985)
- "Finnegan's Wake" (1985)
- "Immigrant" (1985)
- "Catacombs" (1985)
- "Webrider" (1985)
- "Drop-Out" (1986)
- "Rainbow's End" (1986)
- "The Price of Lightning" (1986)
- "Inky" (1987)
- "Hitchhiker" (1988)
- "Chimera" (1989)
- "Wart" (1989)
- "A Thief in the Night" (1989)
- "The Icarus Epidemic" (1990)
- "Plumduff Potato-Eye" (1990)
- "Computer Portrait" (1990)
- "The Kingdom of the Blind Eye" (1991)
- "Castles in the Air" (1992)
- "The War of '07" (1992) (collected in Mike Resnick's anthology Alternate Presidents)
- "Mourning Blue" (1993)
- "When Johnny Comes Marching Home Again - And Again - And Again" (1993)
- "The Lady or the Tiger" (1993)
- "Flea Powder" (1994)
- "Roots and Forbidden Fruit" (1994)
- "The Widower's Wife" (1996)
- "Circus" (1996)
- "Ram in Wolf's Clothing" (1997)
- "Puss" (1999)
- "Reflections" (2000)
- "The Queen's Jewels" (2000)
- "The Walls That Bind" (2001)
- "The Lone Granger" (2002)
- "Wimpin' Wady" (2005)
