= Jack Gaughan =

American science fiction artist (1930–1985)

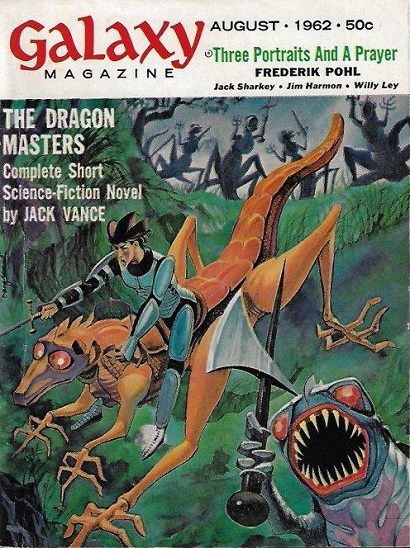
Gaughan provided the cover illustration for Jack Vance's "The Dragon Masters" in 1962

John Brian Francis "Jack" Gaughan, pronounced like 'gone' (September 24, 1930 – July 21, 1985), was an American science fiction artist and illustrator and multiple winner of the Hugo Award in the category of Best Professional Artist.

== Career ==
John Brian Francis Gaughan was born September 24, 1930, in Springfield, Ohio, to James J. and Elizabeth Gaughan.

Working primarily with Donald A. Wollheim at Ace Books, and DAW Books from 1971, his simple linear style brought to life images of such works as Andre Norton's Witch World novels and E. E. Smith's Lensmen and Skylark novels (for which he did two related sets of Pyramid Books covers). His broad visual vocabulary enabled him to render the objects, spaceships and scenes in whatever was presented to him as they were described in the books and stories he illustrated. That was especially an accomplishment as many of these authors drew on their knowledge of esoteric subjects for their imagery. This ability made him very popular among people with an engineering background.

During most of Ejler Jakobsson's tenure as editor of Galaxy Science Fiction from 1969 to 1974, Gaughan produced all of the illustration and much of the design that went on in the magazine. In addition, many of the books he did for Ace featured hand-lettered titled pages, frontispieces, or maps with Gaughan's distinctive calligraphy. One example is its 1966 edition of Alan Garner's The Weirdstone of Brisingamen. (Ace replaced the Gaughan cover illustration in its second printing, 1978.) L. Sprague de Camp's 1967 anthology, The Fantastic Swordsmen, included a Gaughan map before each of the eight collected stories. His maps also grace the Ace first editions of some Witch World novels – including the 1963 first edition of the first one – and Mark S. Geston's Lords of the Starship (title page and map).

Gaughan illustrated the covers and hand-lettered title pages for the unauthorized first paperback edition of J. R. R. Tolkien's The Lord of the Rings, which Ace released in 1965. A illustration Gaughan did of Samuel R. Delany was also used at the cover art for Delany's 1988 autobiography The Motion of Light in Water.

Beside his professional work, he was a frequent contributor to SF fan magazines. In his heyday he was often nominated for Hugo Awards for best professional artist and best fan artist. In 1967, he won both awards in the same year. Locus ran a column by him for a while.

Gaughan died on July 21, 1985, in Springfield, Ohio. In his memory, the New England Science Fiction Association presents the annual Jack Gaughan Award for best emerging science fiction illustrator. Gaughan was posthumously inducted by the Science Fiction and Fantasy Hall of Fame in 2015.
