= Bookspan =

American online book seller (company)

Bookspan LLC
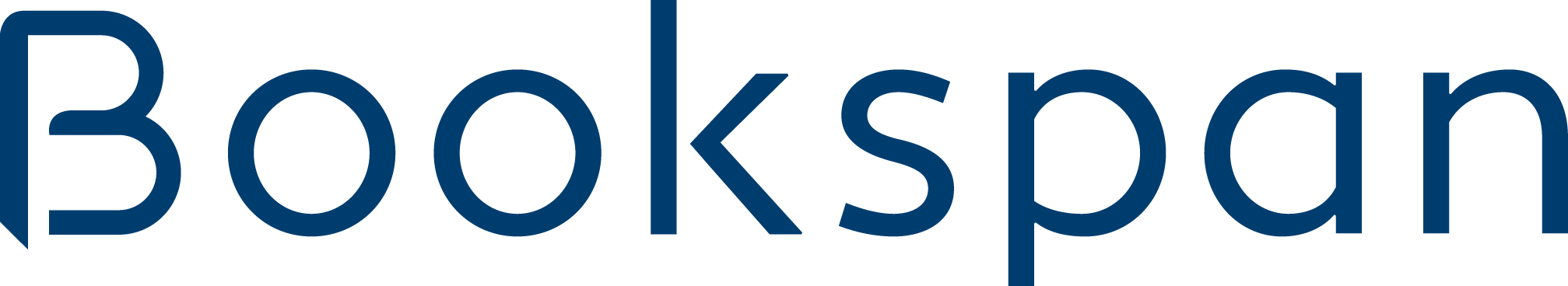
- Founded: 2000; 26 years ago in New York City, New York, United States
- Headquarters: New York City, New York, United States
- Key people: Steven Miller (CEO); Richard Johnson (COO); Delaney Manders (CTO)
- Parent: Pride Tree Holdings
- Website: bookspan.com (unsafe domain)

Bookspan LLC is a New York–based online bookseller, founded in 2000.

Bookspan began as a joint endeavor by Bertelsmann and Time Warner. Bertelsmann took over control in 2007; a year later, it sold its interest to Najafi Companies, an Arizona investment firm. Najafi held its ownership in a subsidiary named Direct Brands, which also held Najafi's ownership in the Columbia House record club. In 2013, Najafi sold its interest in Direct Brands to Pride Tree Holdings, a New York–based media and consumer technology holding company founded in 2012 and incorporated in Delaware.

Bookspan operates a number of book sales clubs. As of 2017, these include:

- Crafter's Choice
- Crossings Book Club
- Doubleday Book Club
- The Good Cook
- History Book Club
- The Literary Guild
- Mystery Guild
- Science Fiction Book Club (SFBC)
