= Gideon Emery =

British actor

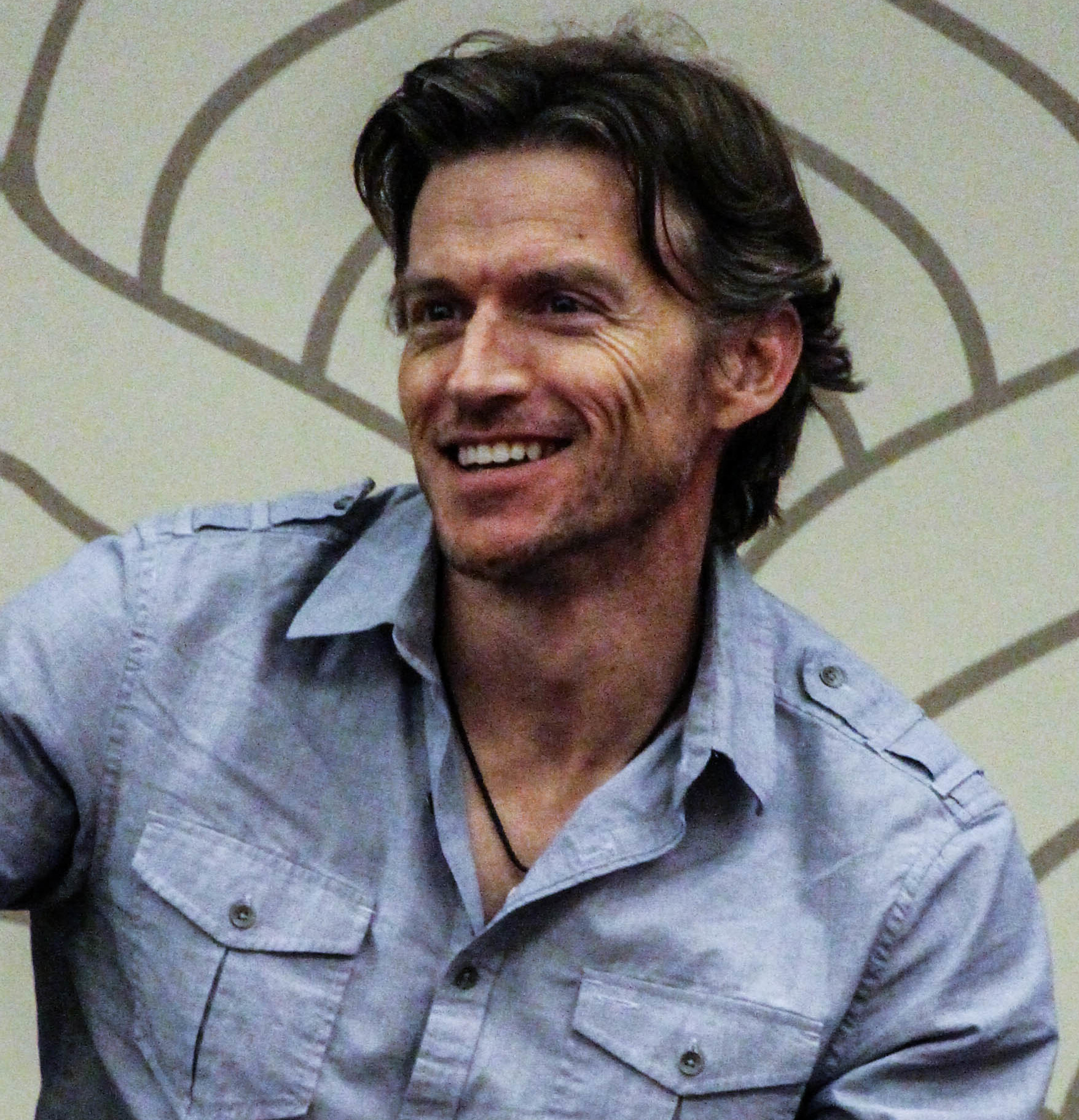
- Emery at the 2017 Howlercon
- Born: September 12, 1972 (age 54); Windsor, England
- Education: Winbury Prep School, Pridwin Preparatory School, Reading Blue Coat School, St John's College
- Occupation: Actor
- Years active: 1994–present
- Spouse: Autumn Withers (m. 2014)
- Children: 1
- Website: demoreel.com/gideon-emery/

Gideon Emery (born September 12, 1972) is an English actor. He is best known for his role as Deucalion in Teen Wolf and starring as himself in Call of Duty: Advanced Warfare. His career also includes providing voice-over work in video games, television series and films, notably as Fenris in Dragon Age II.

== Early life and education ==
Emery was born to Pauline, a competitive horse rider and Ashton, a management consultant. He has two half-brothers. At the age of 4, his father moved the family to Johannesburg, South Africa. Emery kept himself amused by imitating characters from film and television. Early impersonations included Michael Jackson and Max from Hart to Hart. He returned to England during high school, briefly attending Reading Blue Coat School. But it was back in South Africa at St John's College where he cemented his love for acting, playing Dick Deadeye in the Gilbert & Sullivan musical H.M.S. Pinafore and winning Best Actor for the role of Mr. Glum in The Glums comedy sketch, "L'Engagement". After briefly considering a career in graphic art, he went on to study acting at the University of the Witwatersrand. Student roles included Salieri in Amadeus and Gregor in Steven Berkoff's adaption of Kafka's The Metamorphosis.

== Personal life ==
On 19 October 2014, Emery married actress Autumn Withers in Santa Barbara, California. They live in Los Angeles and have a child.

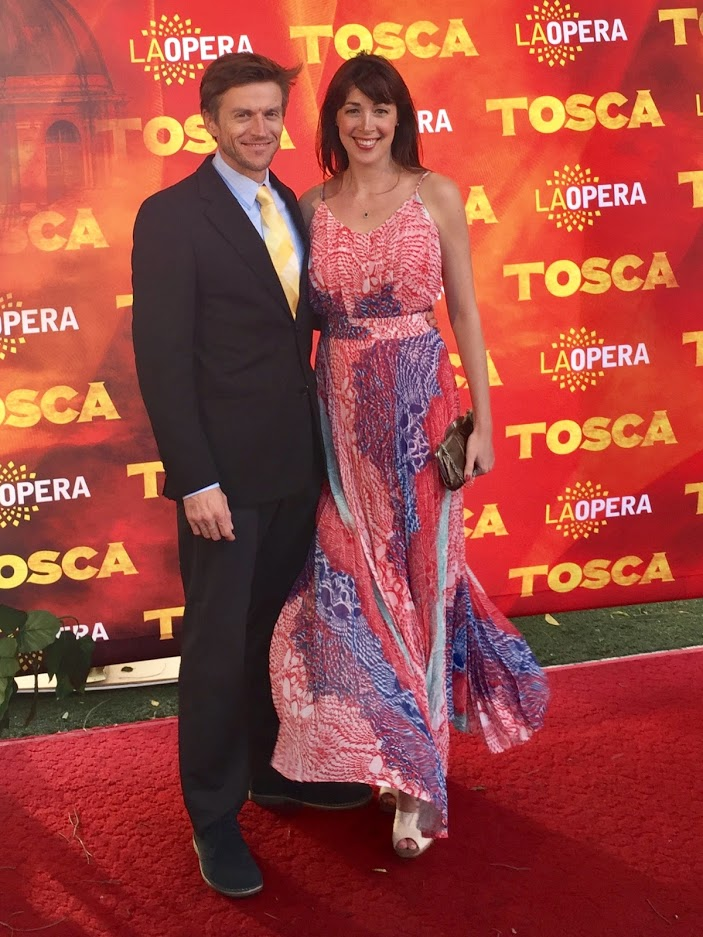
Gideon Emery and Autumn Withers attend Tosca at LA Opera at the Dorothy Chandler Pavilion in Los Angeles on 27 April 2017

== Career ==
In his third year of drama school, friend Ashley Callie was going to audition for Johannesburg's annual Christmas pantomime, directed by Janice Honeyman. Emery was persuaded to go along and ended up being cast. He played a couple of characters, but impressed with his stand-up routine during a set change. As a result, fellow cast member, veteran actor Bill Flynn introduced him to his agent and his career was started. Around this time, he also began what was to become a prolific voice career. (He would later win a Gold Craft Award at the 2003 Loerie Advertising Awards) He played in a number of stand-up venues and established himself as character actor, often performing multiple roles within a single play, such as all the male roles in Mark Ravenhill's Sleeping Around and Tom, Leslie and Phyllis in A.R. Gurney's Sylvia.

He performed standup comedy on television and was a series regular on the sketch comedy show Not Quite Friday Night. He received the National Vita Award for Comedy for the role of Maloom in the play Heel Against the Head, once again alongside Bill Flynn and actor/playwright Paul Slabolepszy. Emery has also performed his own one-man plays, Thin Man Talking and The Great Glendini. For the latter, he recorded a jazz standards album, Standard Ease. He acted alongside the late Bill Flynn for a third and final time, playing Bernard to Flynn's Willy Loman in the award-winning Baxter Theatre production of Death of a Salesman.

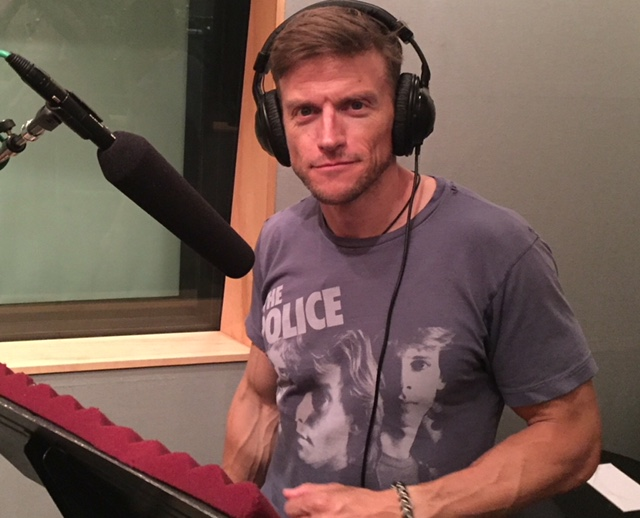
Gideon Emery in a recording studio in Los Angeles

Emery found himself playing various roles in visiting British and American film and television productions. He decided that the screen was where he wanted to focus his attention. With most major projects casting their lead roles overseas, he decided it was time to explore more diverse opportunities. In late 2003, he moved to Los Angeles, where he has played characters both on screen (Last Resort, Takers, Moonlight, Burn Notice) and for video games such as Final Fantasy XII, Vanquish, Dragon Age II and Tekken series (starting from Tekken 6 – present). He is an in-demand motion capture performer and can be seen and heard in the games Call of Duty: Advanced Warfare, Battlefield 3 and Halo Wars 2, all of which also use his likeness. He has also narrated over 50 audiobooks.

Emery had a recurring role on the hit MTV series Teen Wolf as season three's main antagonist Deucalion, a blind but powerful Alpha werewolf who leads a pack consisting entirely of Alphas. Emery reprised the role in season five: "To prove not only to others, but also to himself, that Deucalion is capable of being true and noble." He would return once again for the final season of the show. He won multiple best actor awards for his role as Richard Pine in Bill Hanson's adaptation of Stephen King's Survivor Type. Emery is the creator, director and star of E&N with Ed Neusbit, a comedic news parody show offering "all the news you never knew you needed". Other recurring roles include Daredevil, Wolf Pack, Dash & Lily, Shameless, Last Resort, Good Behavior and Scream: Resurrection.

== Filmography ==
=== Live-action roles ===
==== Film ====
Year	Title	Role	Notes	Source
1997	Great Soldiers	Bowers		
2000	Glory Glory	Sil		
2001	Diamond Cut Diamond	Paddy		
2002	The Sorcerer's Apprentice	Sly		
2004	A Case of Murder	Eric Norkem		
2004	Cape of Good Hope	Miles		
2007	Primeval	Matt Collins		
2007	Almaz Black Box	Wesley Abbot		
2007	Greetings from the Shore	Sasha Mientkciewicz		
2008	Train	Willy		
2010	Takers	Sergei		
2011	Blue Crush 2	Joel		
2012	Survivor Type	Richard Pine	Short film	
2018	Avalanche	Greg		
2019	100 Days to Live	Victor Quinn		
2020	Cabin Fever	Thieleman		
2025	G20	Warren Paxton		
2026	Lee Cronin's The Mummy	Vogel		

==== Television ====
Year	Title	Role	Notes	Source
1995	Not Quite Friday Night	Various	Recurring	
1995	Honeytown II	Taylor	Recurring	
1996	Rhodes	Allan Wilson	2 episodes	
1999	Saints, Sinners and Settlers	Sgt. Williamson	Episode: ""The Good Doctor: Trial of H.F. Verwoerd"	
2003	Red Water	Gene Bradley	Television film	
2005	Commander in Chief	Jared Lyons	Episode: "First Disaster"	
2007	24	Leon	Episode: "Day 6: 6:00pm – 7:00pm"	
2007	Passions	Max	2 episodes	
2007	Moonlight	Donovan Shepherd	Episode: "12:04 AM"	
2008	General Hospital	Jasper "Jax" Jacks	3 episodes	
2008	CSI: NY	Christopher Vackner	Episode: "Admissions"	
2008	The Middleman	Vlad the Impaler	Episode: "The Vampiric Puppet Lamentation"	
2009	Eleventh Hour	Brandon Hertle	Episode: "Miracle"	
2009	90210	Kevin	Episode: "Off the Rails"	
2009	Burn Notice	Sean Glenanne	Episode: "Long Way Back"	
2010	The Forgotten	Sean Hennessey	Episode: "Double Doe"	
2010	Castle	Lloyd Saunders	Episode: "Almost Famous"	
2011	The Mentalist	Owen Melling	Episode: "The Red Mile"	
2011	NCIS: Los Angeles	Jeff Kinto	Episode: "Rocket Man"	
2012	Last Resort	Booth	3 episodes	
2013–17	Teen Wolf	Deucalion	18 episodes	
2013	True Blood	Justin	Episode: "Fuck the Pain Away"	
2013	NCIS	Rudolph Stalin	Episode: "Gut Check"	
2013	Beverly Hills Cop	Lyle Hawes	Pilot	
2014	Shameless	Professor Moss	3 episodes	
2015	Grimm	Damien Barso	Episode: "Trial by Fire"	
2015	E&N with Ed Neusbit	Ed Neusbit	Web series Also creator	
2015	Daredevil	Anatoly Ranskahov	Episodes: "Into the Ring", "In the Blood"	
2016–17	Good Behavior	Silk	4 episodes	
2016	Chicago P.D.	Wade McGregor	Episode: " All Cylinders Firing"	
2018	S.W.A.T.	Gunnar Cade	Episode: "Seizure"	
2019	Scream: Resurrection	Officer T. Reynolds	5 episodes	
2019	Blue Bloods	Daniel Shapiro	Episode: "The Price You Pay"	
2020	The Blacklist	Edward Lussier	Episode: "Twamie Ullulaq"	
2020	Dash & Lily	Adam	Recurring	
2023	Wolf Pack	Malcolm	2 episodes	

==== Theatre ====
Play	Role	Stage	Notes	Source
Dr. Lox	Dr. Lox	Zombie Joe's Underground		
Certified Male	Alex	Montecasino Theatre, Theatre on the Bay		
The Great Glendini	Glendini	Theatre on the Square	One-man show	
Death of a Salesman	Bernard	Baxter Theatre		
Sleeping Around	All Male Roles	Theatre on the Square		
Lane and Abel	Director	Market Theatre		
Children of the Wolf	Robin	Alhambra Theatre, Theatre on the Bay		
Sylvia	Tom, Leslie, Phyllis	Alexander Theatre		
Thin Man Talking	The Man	National Arts Festival	One-man show	
Not the Midnight Mass		Dock Rd Theatre, Civic Theatre		
Heel Against the Head	Ma Loom	Civic Theatre, Baxter Theatre		
Legends Alive	Various	Supper Club	Musical	
Heaven Can't Wait	Various	Theatre on the Track	Musical	
The Fall of the House of Usher	Roderick Usher	Wits Theatre		
Sinbad's African Adventures	Various	Civic Theatre	Pantomime	
With Incidental Music Attached	Various	Harper's	A capella musical	

=== Voice over roles ===
==== Film ====
Year	Title	Role	Notes	Source
2014	How to Train Your Dragon 2	Teeny		
2015	Krampus	Krampus		
2017	Transformers: The Last Knight	Knight of Iacon	Uncredited	
2018	Suicide Squad: Hell to Pay	Sameer Park / Copperhead	Direct-to-video	
2019	How to Train Your Dragon: The Hidden World	Trapper		

==== Television ====
Year	Title	Role	Notes	Source
2009–10	Star Wars: The Clone Wars	Lott Dod, Mee Deechi, Gotal, Kerch Kusi	6 episodes	
2015	DC Super Friends	Captain Cold		
2017–18	Tangled: The Series	Weasel	7 episodes	
2018	Avengers Assemble	Moon Knight	Episode: "Beyond"	
2020	Aggretsuko	Seiya	English dub; Episode: "The Blessings of Life"	
2024	Jurassic World: Chaos Theory	Sullivan	Episode: "Batten Down the Hatches"	

==== Video games ====
Year	Title	Role	Notes	Source
2004	EverQuest II	Overseer Travagg, Lt. Darrius, Kazar, Vleko, Sentius Poisonleaf, Crispin Luvinius		
2004	GoldenEye: Rogue Agent	Number One / Ernst Stavro Blofeld		
2005	The Matrix: Path of Neo	Bane		
2006	Blazing Angels: Squadrons of WWII	British Soldiers		
2006	Star Wars: Empire at War: Forces of Corruption	Universal HUD, General Mohc, Imperial Officer #1		
2006	Final Fantasy XII	Balthier	English dub	
2007	Fantastic Four: Rise of the Silver Surfer	Victor Von Doom / Doctor Doom		
2007	Blazing Angels 2: Secret Missions of WWII	British General, British Pilot #1		
2007	Company of Heroes: Opposing Fronts	Major John "Baldy" Theobald Blackmore		
2007	Final Fantasy Tactics: The War of the Lions	Balthier, additional voices	English dub	
2007	Star Wars Battlefront: Renegade Squadron	Col. Serra, Narrator, Imperial Commander		
2007	Pirates of the Caribbean Online	Additional Voices		
2007	Mass Effect	Chellick, ERCS Guard, Turian Assassin		
2007	Call of Duty 4: Modern Warfare	Mac, SAS 4		
2007	Hannah Montana: Spotlight World Tour	Announcer		
2008	Kingdom Under Fire: Circle of Doom	Duane		
2008	Turok	Reese		
2008	Brothers in Arms: Hell's Highway	PFC Dawson		
2008	Cabela's Dangerous Hunts 2009	Henry Tally, Sergei Demochev		
2008	Resistance 2	British Commando		
2008	Tom Clancy's EndWar	German Soldier, Russian Soldier		
2009	Halo Wars	Jerome-092, Suicide Grunt		
2009	Company of Heroes: Tales of Valor	Kangaroo, Staghound (British), Churchill		
2009	The Chronicles of Riddick: Assault on Dark Athena	Guard		
2009	Terminator Salvation	John Connor		
2009	inFAMOUS	Additional Voices		
2009	Red Faction: Guerrilla	Additional Voices		
2009	Medieval Games	The Black Knight, Jester		
2009	Dragon Age: Origins	Taliesen, Alarith, Frandlin Ivo, Oskias, Mystical Human Male, Lothering Templar, Harrowmont Crier, Restless Guard, Redcliffe Militiaman, Redcliffe Quartermaster, Denerim Gang Leader, Howe Estate Guard, Drunken Elf, Tapster's Reveler		
2010	Final Fantasy XIII	Cocoon Inhabitants		
2010	Kane & Lynch 2: Dog Days	Criminal		
2010	Blade Kitten	Sol Trooper, Infestation Worker		
2010	Mass Effect 2	Kenn, Officer Tammert, Captain Gavorn, Additional Voices		
2010	God of War III	Poseidon, Captain		
2010	God of War: Ghost of Sparta	Poseidon, Crazed Soldier		
2010	Vanquish	Sam Gideon		
2010	Assassin's Creed: Brotherhood	Borgia Captain Guards, Additional Voices		
2011	Warhammer 40,000: Dawn of War II – Retribution	Sentinel, Guardsman		
2011	Dragon Age II	Fenris, Paxley, Temmerin, Liam, Tethras Garen, Samson		
2011	Rift	Trucker, Stranded Crew, Fan		
2011	The Sims Medieval	Sim		
2011	Dungeon Siege III	Florin, Mudgutter, Abi-Eshu, Gavril, Hans		
2011	F.E.A.R. 3	Additional Voices		
2011	Rise of Nightmares	Josh		
2011	Gears of War 3	Stranded Crew #1, Thrashball Fan #1		
2011	Sesame Street: Once Upon a Monster	Doo-Rays		
2011	Rocksmith	Narrator		
2011	Battlefield 3	Staff Sergeant Henry "Black" Blackburn	Also likeness and motion capture	
2011	Uncharted 3: Drake's Deception	Marlowe's Agents, Indian Ocean Pirates		
2011	The Elder Scrolls V: Skyrim	Arcturus, Gaius Maro, Imperial Archer, Imperial Mage, Imperial Soldier, Lieutenant Salvarus, Penitus Oculatus Agent, Rexus, Stormcloak Soldier, Sulla Trebatius, Wounded Soldier, Etienne Rarnis		
2011	Star Wars: The Old Republic	Darth Rivix, Captain Revar, Tobin Harlan, Abdan Sho, Alek Teral, Cavill Arin, Comms Officer Jule, Lokir-Ka, Peyton Swole, Sadoll, The Argent Serpent, W6-S4, Captain Winborn, Col Hunt, Narvurin, Spice Trader		
2012	Final Fantasy XIII-2	Additional Voices	English dub	
2012	Street Fighter X Tekken	Steve Fox		
2012	Ninja Gaiden 3	Additional Voices		
2012	Resident Evil: Operation Raccoon City	Carlos Oliveira		
2012	Starhawk	Crowd, Rifters		
2012	Diablo III	Joshua, Lliorgor the Crazed, Tristram Militia Ghost		
2012	Dragon's Dogma	Seneschal	Also motion capture	
2012	Tom Clancy's Ghost Recon: Future Soldier	Nigerian Mercenary, Additional Voices		
2012	Guild Wars 2	Valiant Estiene, Fraxx, Gareth, Celegant Nightmare		
2012	World of Warcraft: Mists of Pandaria	Lor'themar Theron	Since Patch 5.1	
2012	Assassin's Creed III	Reginald Birch, Redcoat, Aquila Crewman		
2012	Lego The Lord of the Rings	Orc, Elf		
2013	Fire Emblem Awakening	Gaius	English dub	
2013	God of War: Ascension	Poseidon		
2013	Starcraft II: Heart of the Swarm	Dominion Marine		
2013	The Last of Us	Additional Voices		
2013	The Wonderful 101	Laurence Nelson, Additional Wonderful Ones		
2013	Final Fantasy XIV: A Realm Reborn	Twin Adder Dispatch, Urianger, Pashtarot, Various	English dub	
2013	Infinity Blade III	Shaman, Additional Voices		
2013	Skylanders: Swap Force	Zoo Lou		
2013	Killzone: Shadow Fall	Jorhan Stahl	Also motion capture	
2014	Lightning Returns: Final Fantasy XIII	Various	English dub	
2014	Diablo III: Reaper of Souls	Crusader (Male), Additional Voices		
2014	The Elder Scrolls Online	Male Altmer #3, Male Dunmer #3		
2014	Wolfenstein: The New Order	Fergus Reid	Also motion capture	
2014	WildStar	Corrigan Doon, Bounty Board, Marauder, Ikthian Male, Mordesh Male		
2014	Enemy Front	Additional Voices		
2014	Destiny	Master Ives		
2014	Skylanders: Trap Team	Zoo Lou		
2014	Call of Duty: Advanced Warfare	Gideon	Also likeness and motion capture	
2014	Dragon Age: Inquisition	Samson		
2015	The Order: 1886	Additional Voices		
2015	Wolfenstein: The Old Blood	Fergus Reid	Also motion capture	
2015	Fire Emblem Fates	Keaton, Dwyer, Asugi		
2015	Mad Max			
2015	Metal Gear Solid V: The Phantom Pain	Soldiers, Extras	English dub	
2015	Skylanders: SuperChargers	Zoo Lou		
2015	Halo 5: Guardians	Governor Sloan		
2015	StarCraft II: Legacy of the Void	Tal'darim Executor		
2016	Lego Marvel's Avengers	Bad Guy, Klaue Mercenary, South American Male		
2016	King's Quest	Kyle, Royal Knights	Chapter III: Once Upon a Climb	
2016	Uncharted 4: A Thief's End	Orca		
2017	Halo Wars 2	Captain James Cutter	Also likeness and motion capture	
2017	World of Final Fantasy	Balthier	DLC; English dub	
2017	Uncharted: The Lost Legacy	Orca, Shoreline Mercenary	Also motion capture	
2017	Destiny 2	Devrim Kay VIII, Toland		
2017	Middle-earth: Shadow of War	Brûz the Chopper	Also motion capture	
2017	Wolfenstein II: The New Colossus	Fergus Reid	Also motion capture	
2018	World of Warcraft: Battle for Azeroth	Brother Pike		
2018	Firewall: Zero Hour	Announcer	Defending Team	
2018	Lego DC Super-Villains	Copperhead, Captain Boomerang, John Constantine		
2018	Fallout 76	Thomas Eckhart, Holden McMerrick, Traveling Salesman	Salesman role credited as "gym rat"	
2019	Marvel Ultimate Alliance 3: The Black Order	Moon Knight	Curse of the Vampire DLC	
2019	Call of Duty: Modern Warfare	Nikto		
2020	Final Fantasy VII Remake	Biggs	English dub	
2021	Cookie Run: Kingdom	Prophet Cookie	English dub	
2022	Tactics Ogre: Reborn	Hobyrim Vandam	English dub	
2023	Star Wars Jedi: Survivor	Lank Denvik; additional voices, BD-1 motion capture performance		
2023	Diablo IV	Iosef		
2024	Tekken 8	Steve Fox		
2024	Final Fantasy VII Rebirth	Biggs	English dub	
2026	S.T.A.L.K.E.R. 2: Heart of Chornobyl	Myklukha	English dub Cost of Hope DLC	

==== Audiobooks ====
Year	Title	Author	Notes	Source
2008	Playing the Enemy	John Carlin		
2008	Tell Me a Story 2	Amy Friedman	Narrates "Kerplunk"	
2009	Operation Kronstadt	Harry Ferguson		
2009	The Bottom Billion	Paul Collier		
2009	The Jennifer Morgue	Charles Stross		
2009	The Atrocity Archive	Charles Stross		
2009	The Resident Member	Paul Marlowe	Narrates the role of Litchfield	
2009	The Price of Love and Other Stories	Peter Robinson	Narrates "The Magic of Your Touch", "Shadows on the Water" and "The Cherub Affair"	
2009	The Genesis Secret	Tom Knox		
2009	Amazing Tales for Making Men Out of Boys	Neil Oliver		
2009	The Boat	Nam Le	Narrates "Halflead Bay"	
2009	Enough Already	Peter Walsh		
2010	The Fuller Memorandum	Charles Stross		
2010	From Hell With Love	Simon R. Green		
2010	Ordinary Thunderstorms	William Boyd		
2010	Rogue Farm	Charles Stross		
2010	Zombie Economics: How Dead Ideas Still Walk Among Us	John Quiggin		
2011	Size Matters Not	Warwick Davis		
2011	Hell Ship	Philip Palmer	Narrates the role of Sharrock	
2011	For Heaven's Eyes Only	Simon R. Green		
2011	Kiteworld	Keith Roberts		
2012	The Apocalypse Codex	Charles Stross		
2012	Live and Let Drood	Simon R. Green		
2013	Overtime	Charles Stross		
2013	Down on the Farm	Charles Stross		
2013	Casino Infernale	Simon R. Green		
2013	Biggles: The Authorised Biography	John Pearson		
2013	The Lady From Guatemala	V.S. Pritchett	Narrates "The Wedding"	
2013	Tor.com: Selected Original Fiction, 2008-2012	Various Authors	Contributing narrator	
2014	Palimpsest	Charles Stross		
2014	The Rhesus Chart	Charles Stross		
2014	Property of a Lady Faire	Simon R. Green		
2014	Chase Your Shadow: The Trials of Oscar Pistorius	John Carlin		
2014	Live and Let Drood	Simon R. Green		
2014	Wireless	Charles Stross		
2015	Zero World	Jason M. Hough		
2015	Stalky & Co.	Rudyard Kipling		
2015	The Illegal	Lawrence Hill		
2015	From a Drood To a Kill	Simon R. Green		
2016	Dr. DOA	Simon R. Green		
2016	The Nightmare Stacks	Charles Stross		
2017	Cruel Is the Night	Karo Hamalainen	Narrates the role of Robert	
2017	The Delirium Brief	Charles Stross		
2017	The Duchess	Danielle Steel		
2017	Moonbreaker	Simon R. Green		
2018	My Name Is Nathan Lucius	Mark Winkler		
2020	The Down Days	Ilze Hugo	Co-narrator with Bianca Amato	
2020	Dead Lies Dreaming	Charles Stross		
2021	The Best Thing You Can Steal	Simon R. Green		
2022	Escape From Yokai Land	Charles Stross		
2022	A Matter of Death and Life	Simon R. Green		

== Discography ==
- Standard Ease (2011)

== Awards ==
- Best Actor Award – Survivor Type – Golden Egg Film Festival (2014, Winner)
- Award of Merit: Leading Actor – Survivor Type – Best Shorts Competition (2014, Winner)
- Award of Excellence: Leading Actor – Survivor Type – Accolade Competition (2013, Winner)
- Best Actor in a Short Film – Survivor Type – Bare Bones International Film Festival (2012, Winner)
- Best Actor Award – Survivor Type – Los Angeles International Underground Film Festival (2012, Winner)
- Award of Merit – Sex Drive – Accolade Competition (2010, Winner)
- Suspense/Thriller Award – The Price of Love and Other Stories – Audie Awards (2010, Nominee)
- Supporting Performance in a Drama – Brothers in Arms: Hell's Highway – Videogame Awards (2008, Nominee)
- Loerie Gold Craft Award: Radio VO – SABC: Wed-nes-day – Loeries Advertising Awards (2003, Winner)
- Best Actor in a Comedy – Heel Against the Head – National Vita Awards (1995, Winner)
