= Gráinne (disambiguation) =

Gráinne, or Grainne, may refer to:

== People ==
- Gráinne (given name), feminine given name in the Irish language

== Fiction/Mythology ==
- Gráinne, a character in the Fenian Cycle of Irish mythology
- Finn and Gráinne, short story
- The Pursuit of Diarmuid and Gráinne, story from the Fenian Cycle of Irish mythology,
- Gráinne, a book by Keith Roberts

== Ships ==
- LÉ Grainne (CM10), mine-sweeper
