= Times Without Number =

1969 novel by John Brunner

- First expanded edition (1969)
- Author: John Brunner
- Cover artist: John Schoenherr
- Language: English
- Publisher: Ace Books
- Publication date: 1969
- Publication place: United States
- Media type: Print (book)
- Pages: 156
- OCLC: 1145589

Times Without Number is a time travel/alternate history novel by John Brunner.

== Publication history ==
Originally Brunner wrote three stories published in 1962 in consecutive issues of the British magazine Science Fiction Adventures: "Spoil of Yesterday" in No. 25, "The Word Not Written" in No. 26, and "The Fullness of Time" in No. 27.

In the same year, a considerably different version appeared as a fix-up novel under the title Times Without Number, which was published as an Ace Double together with Destiny's Orbit by Donald A. Wollheim (using the pseudonym David Grinnell).

In 1969, Ace Books published the book again, in a version considerably revised and expanded by Brunner, different from both the magazine stories and the 1962 novel.

== Historical background to the plot ==
The book's plot takes place in the years 1988–1989 in a timeline where the Spanish Armada under the command of the Duke of Parma successfully invaded England in 1588, aided by a second army embarked from the Spanish Netherlands under the command of the Earl of Barton, an illegitimate scion of the Catholic Scottish House of Stewart, who entered the service of Spain and turned out to be one of the great military talents of history; after relieving Parma as Spanish commander in the Netherlands so that the duke could assume command of the Armada, Barton launched a lightning campaign that put down their rebellion and perpetuated Spanish rule and the Catholic religion.

At some unspecified later time Spain also managed to conquer and absorb its long-time rival France through circumstances that are evidently not considered as pivotal as the conquest of England. At the time of the Armada, France was deeply embroiled in the Wars of Religion, in which Spain supported the Catholic League while Queen Elizabeth of England and the Dutch rebels supported the French Huguenots. Obviously, the elimination of both England and the Dutch would have made a big difference for the balance of forces in the French wars, but Brunner gives no details.

However, having their hands full in the north, the Spaniards neglected the defense of their own Iberian homeland, which was reconquered by Islamic forces of the Mediterranean Khalifate – a titanic event of which no details are given, either. Spanish refugees moved to Britain, which became the new base of their empire and whose inhabitants were gradually assimilated. Spanish displaced English, which barely survived as "a debased peasant tongue". The Spanish-speaking people of the capital Londres called themselves "Imperials" rather than "Spaniards", and except for a few diehard English nationalists regarded the Armada's victory as a blessing.

Having already conquered South and Central America, the Empire did not have a great need of North America. Rather than conquer and colonize it themselves, the Imperials armed the Mohawks and encouraged them to embark on a great campaign of conquest until the Pacific. The Mohawk leaders, ruling from New Madrid (on the site of New York City) were taken into the Empire's highest nobility. However, other Native American tribes felt resentful of Mohawk dominance and the European backing for it – a resentment which would turn out to have a crucial importance in the book's later part.

In Europe, the Empire was opposed by a "heterogeneous political alliance" of Lithuania, Poland, Prussia, and the Orthodox Russ, known as the "fretful, unstable" Confederacy of the East, regarded by the Empire as its "coeval super-power." Scotland and Sweden-Norway remained independent, the latter as essentially the last bastion of Protestantism, which the Catholic Imperials regarded as a mildly curious local tradition. In the Far East, the dominant power was the Middle Kingdom of Cathay, with a much more modest role played by its cultural dependency, the islands of Çipangu (whose rulers admired the Empire and "sought to turn their geographically analogous location into a politically analogous independence from the mainland culture of Cathay which had dominated virtually their entire recorded history").

In 1892, an Italian named Carlo Borromeo discovered the secret of time-travel, though otherwise the overall level of technology remained not much higher than it was in the 16th Century, with people travelling primarily on horseback and cities lit by open fires. In principle, time travel could have been used as a means of instantaneous travel, but that would have involved the traveller being in two places at the same time, at least for a split second; fearing a time paradox, such use of the device was strictly forbidden.

Moreover, it was quickly realised that time-travel can become in effect a weapon of mass destruction, of which careless or ruthless use might undo the whole of present reality – and in particular, that it might provide the two great powers, locked in a long-lasting cold war, with a means of utterly and mutually destroying each other (similar to nuclear weapons in our world). To avert this danger, use of time travel was strictly regulated by the carefully worded "Treaty of Prague" and limited to two elite bodies – the Western Empire's Society of Time and the Confederacy's Temporal College – both of which are overseen by the Catholic Church in accordance to a special Papal Bull De tenebris temporalibus (of which Brunner provides part of the Latin text). Both great powers want to preserve their monopoly of time-travel and are concerned about Cathayan attempts to develop time apparatus outside the framework of the Vatican-supervised Treaty of Prague (much as, at the time of writing, Americans and Soviets tried to avert Chinese achievement of nuclear arms). A new Pope, upon entering on his job, was given the special privilege of traveling back in time and meeting Jesus Christ. Otherwise, travel to Palestine in Jesus' time was strictly forbidden.

Though slavery still exists, and democracy never appeared, the dominant Catholic Church is less intolerant and harsh than it was at the time of the Armada. Protestantism, surviving only in Scandinavia, is regarded more with curiosity than hostility, and though the Inquisition still exists it has long since abandoned the use of torture in favour of hypnotism. Moreover, there is mention of a movement for women's equality, at least among upper-class women. (Swedish women are mentioned as more assertive than those of other countries – as they were famous for being, in our own world at the time of writing.)

In all, the alternate 20th Century depicted by Brunner is significantly more humane than that in Keith Roberts' Pavane, written a few years later and also based on a victory of the Spanish Armada.

== Plot summary ==
In 1988, Don Miguel Navarro is a "Licentiate in Ordinary" of the Society of Time. As a Licentiate, Don Miguel's primary duty is to ensure the preservation of history, lest an alteration undo the empire. While at a party held by the Marquesa di Jorque, his hostess shows off a gold Aztec mask she had recently received as a gift. Recognizing it instantly as contraband, Don Miguel launches an investigation that eventually leads to the unmasking and arrest of Don Arcimboldo Ruiz, a prominent nobleman (and a cunning and skilful villain) engaged in the illegal acquisition of goods from the past. Don Miguel is then entrusted with returning it to the exact spot in the past from which it was taken, in time for it to be used in the Aztec bloody rites of mass human sacrifice – with which he is duty bound not to interfere but which leave him shaken. Because of his success, Don Miguel is honoured and marked as a coming man.

Some time later, while attending a New Year's Eve ball hosted by the Prince of New Castile – our North America – a prince of the blood and the Commander of the Society of Time, Don Miguel meets Lady Kristina, the daughter of the Swedish ambassador. At her prompting, the two leave the party to explore the city of Londres for themselves. While walking down one of the city's streets, however, they encounter an unusually dressed woman who is assaulted by men who intend to rape her, but turns out be more than able to take care of herself, proceeding to immobilise a number of her assailants before Don Miguel is able to knock her unconscious (the reader can easily recognise that she is adept at some kind of martial art, but in Don Miguel's world these are unknown in the West).

Taking the woman to the Society's headquarters, he attempts to return to the prince's palace in search of Father Ramón, the society's Jesuit master-theoretician, but is stopped by a panicked mob clogging the streets. There he learns of the burning of the palace and the deaths of all of the assembled dignitaries – including the entire Royal Family – at the hands of dozens of female warriors (transported, it turns out, from an alternate timeline in which an Indian king on the Mongol throne rules all of Asia and Europe and which senior members of the Society of Time secretly contacted). After encountering Father Ramón, the two return to Society Headquarters, where they use a special cross-temporal Mass to contact an earlier version of Father Ramón and prevent the massacre from taking place. However, though seeming to end well, the episode leaves Don Miguel with a mounting feeling of anxiety, having found out that his superiors engage in dangerous experiments and thus realizing that his entire reality hangs by an extremely thin thread.

Needing a vacation, Don Miguel travels to remote California, a backwater rarely visited by Europeans. In this history, there had been no California Gold Rush; the gold mines in California are owned by the Imperial government and employ local Native American laborers. While relaxing at a hacienda near a local mine, his host, a Native American engineer named Two Dogs, shows him a steel bit from a rock drill discovered in a recently started mine.

Fearing a violation of the treaty between the Empire and the Confederacy of the East regulating time travel, Don Miguel alerts the Society, which launches a full-scale investigation. When Father Ramón arrives on the scene, however, he insists that no violation has taken place, even though a scouting expedition confirms that there is indeed a group from the 20th Century mining the land in the past. Traveling to the site, Don Miguel and Father Ramón converse with the leader of the group and convince him to end the operation; Father Ramón is clearly determined to defuse the tension and avoid at virtually any price an escalation in the two great powers' relations.

The reason for that becomes clear upon their return: Don Miguel finds out that the "discovery" had in fact been planted by Two Dogs, who is spearheading a conspiracy of anti-Mohawk Native Americans seeking to bring down the Empire, and who manipulate the Eastern Confederacy and make use of it but have their own far-reaching agenda. In the ensuing melee, Two Dogs escapes and Father Ramón is killed. It is assumed that, having failed in his carefully crafted plot, Two Dogs would seek to travel into the past and deal the Empire's past a grievous blow.

Determined to preserve their history, the Society sends Don Miguel and dozens of other Licentiates into the past to prevent Two Dogs from disrupting the pivotal event of the Armada, but while undercover in 1588 Cádiz Don Miguel discovers to his horror that Two Dogs has already succeeded; Parma's second-in-command, the military genius Earl of Barton, no longer exists – having evidently been assassinated by Two Dogs while still an obscure young adventurer – and Parma himself is no longer the commander of the fleet. Urgently rushing back to the present, Don Miguel hopes to sound a last minute warning, but is overtaken by the forwardly proceeding wave of changing reality (a highly painful experience) and arrives not in New Madrid but its analogue, New York City, emerging in Central Park to the amazement of passers-by.

From this, Don Miguel realises that people of the changed timeline have no knowledge of time-travel, which would have given them a clear explanation for a man appearing out of thin air, and that he is the only person in this timeline who knows the secret of time travel. Reflecting upon this he concludes that timelines where time travel exists eventually collapse on themselves, when somebody changes the reality leading to the invention of time-travel itself. He decides to accept developments as God's will and to begin a new life as "the most lonely of all exiles" in the world where he now finds himself, keeping time travel a secret and never disclosing his knowledge of how to build a working time machine. And meanwhile, Two Dogs' ruthless act against the Empire turns out to have boomeranged against Two Dogs' own people, creating a timeline where Native Americans fared much worse than in the one he destroyed.

== The Nature of Time ==
As seen at the shattering conclusion, in the concept of time travel and its consequences taken up in this book, there can be one and only one timeline. Unlike other time travel books where a change in the past creates a new branching timeline which exists side by side with the old one, here changing the past annihilates all of the succeeding later times, and a new timeline has taken the place of the former one. As in Poul Anderson's "Delenda Est", there is a zero-sum game relation – for one timeline to exist, the other one must be destroyed.

Nevertheless, in the earlier part where the King's Palace is burned by female warriors from another timeline, it seems that alternate timelines do exist side by side, and that humans can cross from one to the other. The discrepancy is never completely explained. Father Ramon refers to the world where the Amazons came from as "a potential world", which implies that only one timeline is "truly real" while others have only a "potential reality". All of this, however, is the closely guarded secret of the Society's senior members, who ponder its theological implications as well as the scientific ones. Don Navarro, as a lowly Licentiate, was not supposed to know any of this, and got a bare glimpse only due to the dire emergency. And before he could rise in the Society's hierarchy sufficiently to get a real explanation, his entire timeline is irrevocably destroyed.

== Similarity with "Worlds of the Imperium" and "Lord Darcy" ==
"Times Without Number" was originally published in the same year as Keith Laumer's Worlds of the Imperium. While otherwise very different, the alternate timelines depicted in both books have an Italian inventor near the end of the 19th century make a crucial discovery (time-travel in the one case, travel to alternate timelines in the other) which is taken up by the world's Great Powers and fundamentally shapes later history.

Though having a completely different historical origin, the 20th century of "Times Without Number" has many similarities with that of Randall Garrett's Lord Darcy series. In both there is a Catholic Empire based in London and ruling the British Islands, France and the entire Western Hemisphere (with Christianized Native Americans accepted into its aristocracy). And in both works the Empire depicted is monarchial and conservative, without any trace of democracy, but still relatively benevolent; locked in a decades-long cold war with an Eastern European rival; technologically backward compared to our world, but still possessing a key field of knowledge (time travel, magic) unknown to our 20th century.

== See also ==
- Pavane
- Ruled Britannia
