= Ruled Britannia =

2002 alternate history novel by Harry Turtledove

- Author: Harry Turtledove
- Language: English
- Genre: Alternate history novel
- Publisher: New American Library
- Publication date: 2002
- Publication place: United States
- Media type: Print (Hardcover & Paperback)
- Pages: 464 (hardcover)
- ISBN: 0-451-20717-3 (hardcover edition) & ISBN 0-451-45915-6 (paperback edition)
- OCLC: 49320560

Ruled Britannia is an alternate history novel by Harry Turtledove, first published in hardcover by New American Library in 2002.

The book is set in the years 1597–1598, in an alternate universe where the Spanish Armada is successful in 1588. The Kingdom of England has been conquered and returned to the fold of the Roman Catholic Church under the rule of Queen Isabella, daughter of King Philip II of Spain. Queen Elizabeth is deposed and is imprisoned within the Tower of London as her fellow Protestants are burned as heretics by the English Inquisition.

The story is seen from the point of view of two famous playwrights: English poet William Shakespeare, and Spanish poet Lope de Vega; supporting characters include contemporaries Christopher Marlowe, Richard Burbage, and Will Kemp.

== Plot summary ==
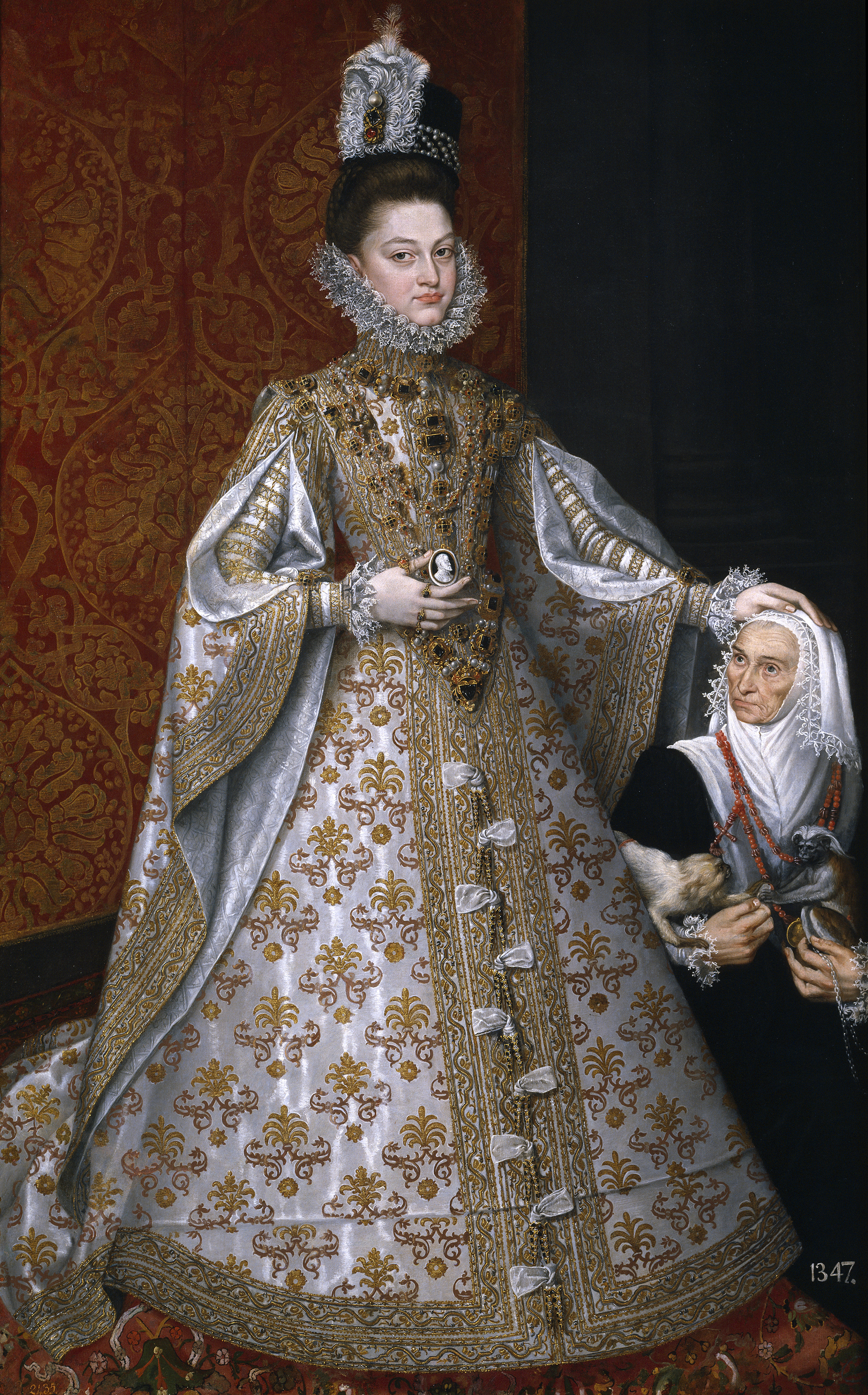
Isabella Clara Eugenia, in this history the Spanish-imposed Queen of England

Shakespeare, actor and renowned playwright, is contacted by Nicholas Skeres on behalf of members of an underground resistance movement who are plotting to overthrow the Spanish dominion of England and restore Elizabeth I to the throne. To do this, they employ Shakespeare himself, tasking him to write a play depicting the saga of Boudica, an ancient Iceni queen who rebelled against the Roman occupation of Great Britain in the 1st century A.D. The conspirators hope that the play will inspire its audience, Britons once again under the heel of a foreign enemy, to overthrow the Spanish.

The plan is complicated by the Spaniards who, also recognizing Shakespeare's talents, commission him to write a play depicting the life of King Philip II of Spain and the Spanish conquest of England. Now Shakespeare must write two plays—one glorifying the valor of England, the other glorifying its conquest and return to the Catholic Church—at the same time. There is also a subplot of the exploits of the skirt-chasing Spanish playwright and soldier Lope de Vega, who is tasked by his superiors in the Spanish military hierarchy to keep an eye on Shakespeare and while he does so flirts from woman to woman. De Vega even acts in Shakespeare's King Philip.

Despite danger at every turn from both the Spanish Inquisition and a home-grown English Inquisition, the secret play comes to fruition, and despite qualms from Shakespeare and his fellow players it is performed. As the conspirators had hoped, the audience is roused into an anti-Spanish fury and rampages through London, killing any Spanish official they see and freeing Elizabeth from the Tower of London. Despite this victory and England's reclaimed freedom, there is considerable loss of life on both sides.

Shakespeare is rewarded by the reinstated Queen Elizabeth with a knighthood and an annulment of his unhappy marriage to Anne Hathaway, which frees him to marry his longtime mistress. The queen also grants his daring request that his King Philip play, which he considers to contain some of his best work, be staged. At the end of the story, Shakespeare uses his new status to facilitate the release of his friend Lope de Vega from English captivity, provided that he immediately return to the Continent.

== Allusions ==
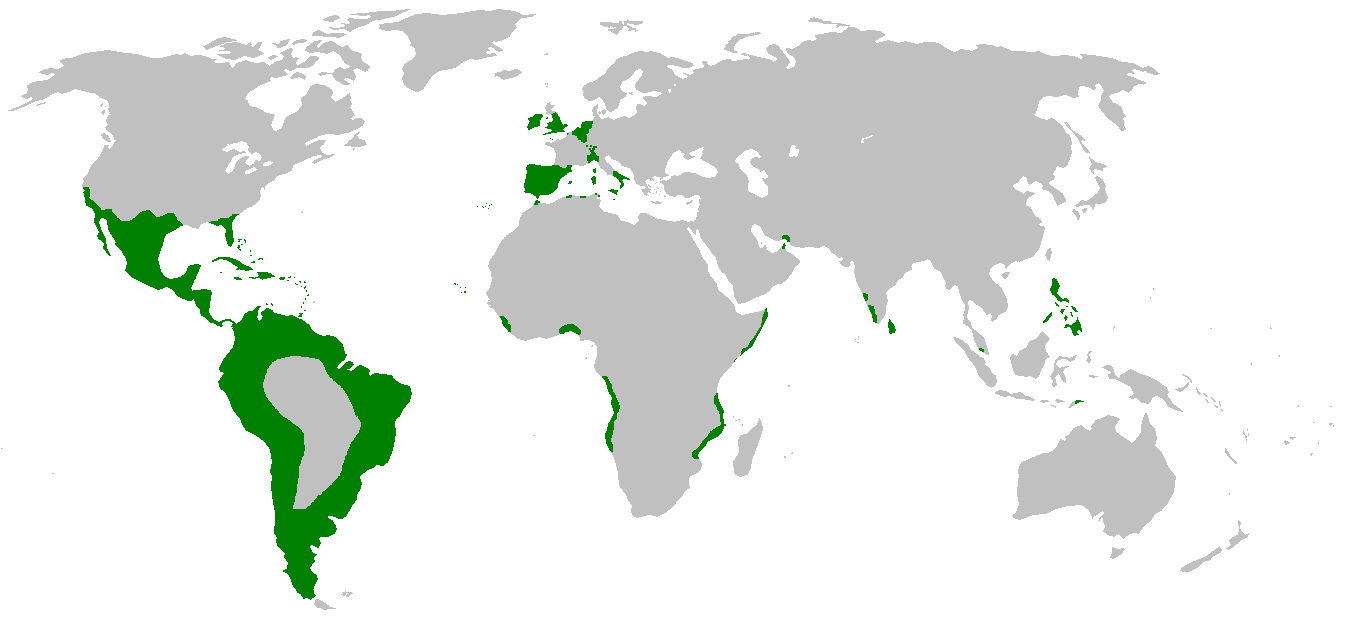
The Spanish Habsburg empire and its dominions in the alternate 1597 of the book.

The book makes several references to various plays by Shakespeare, both real and fictional. Some existing plays, such as Hamlet and As You Like It, are given new names (The Prince of Denmark and If You Like It), and presumably different content. Another play mentioned, Love's Labour's Won, is the title of an actual lost play by Shakespeare, presumed to be a sequel to the existing Love's Labour's Lost. However, the play described in the novel is simply the plot of the extant play.

Christopher Marlowe, who historically died in 1593, lives until October or November 1598 in the novel. As well as his known plays, the novel creates a number of imaginary Marlowe plays, including Caligula and Cambyses, King of Persia, presumably written after 1593. The circumstances of Marlowe's historical death in Deptford are also alluded to.

As the author mentions at the end of the book, he created the play "Boudicca" from elements of Shakespeare's other works and from Bonduca, an actual play on the same subject by Shakespeare's contemporary, sometime collaborator and successor, John Fletcher. Passages from King Philip are combinations and adaptations of lines from numerous actual Shakespeare plays. The dialogue and narrative also contains many references and phrases taken from Shakespeare's plays. One such example is the supporting character Walter Strawberry, a bumbling, malaprop-spewing policeman who appears to be modeled after Constable Dogberry from Much Ado About Nothing.

== Awards ==
The novel won the 2002 Sidewise Award for Alternate History for Long Form, sharing the award with Martin J. Gidron's The Severed Wing.

== Similar works ==
A short Turtledove story of time travel, "We Haven't Got There Yet" (based on Tom Stoppard's Rosencrantz and Guildenstern Are Dead), also features Shakespeare as the third-person narrator. It was published in 2009 and is freely available to read on Tor's website.

Previous to Turtledove, other writers already took up the theme of a victorious Armada, such as John Brunner's Times Without Number and Keith Roberts' Pavane. However, these earlier works depicted the Spanish victory and conquest of England as final and irrevocable, eventually producing a completely different 20th Century (a Spanish-speaking London in Brunner's book, a Catholic England with the Inquisition torturing and burning heretics in Roberts'). Conversely, In Turtledove's version the Spanish occupation of England proves but an ephemeral interlude, being overthrown after ten years, with Elizabeth restored to the throne and the Elizabethan Age resuming – different in detail but not in essence from actual history.
