= Autumn Withers =

American actress, singer and former dancer

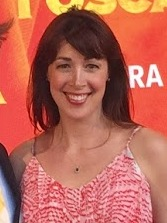
- Withers in 2017
- Occupations: Actress, singer, producer, writer, former dancer
- Years active: 1989–present

Autumn Withers is an American actress, singer and former dancer with the Radio City Rockettes.

== Career ==
Withers's first professional acting credit came during her childhood. While in the Carolinas, she landed a small role in the dance movie, Shag, starring Bridget Fonda and Phoebe Cates. After university, Autumn moved to New York to pursue her dance career. She worked on several off-Broadway productions, before landing a role in Broadway show Yo Alice, from creator Maurice Hines. After a few years, she decided to head to Los Angeles to pursue an acting career. While there, the famed Radio City Rockettes were holding auditions for their company. On a whim, she auditioned, and ended up being cast. Given the choice between staying in New York or touring with the show, she opted for the latter, as it would offer a chance to fulfill not only her love for dance, but another passion: travel. For four years, Withers danced with the Rockettes across the US, as well as Canada but then fate intervened. She was injured during a show, requiring arthroscopic hip surgery, effectively ending her professional dance career.

Returning to Los Angeles to recover, Withers would focus on her acting, specifically in comedy. She studied improv comedy at both iO West and at The Groundlings. One of her first film roles would be as a dancer in The Curious Case of Benjamin Button. Other notable on-camera roles include Mrs Ebbert in Modern Family, Jean in the Sundance film festival favorite Catherine alongside Jenny Slate, and multiple roles in sketch comedy news parody series E&N with Ed Neusbit. More recently, Withers starred in, and co-produced, the dark comedy feature, Avalanche, alongside Gideon Emery.

Withers is also a writer. Together with her writing partner, Ryann Ferguson, they have penned a number of television pilots, from comedy to drama, which center around strong female characters. They are currently actively pitching their shows to studios in Hollywood.

== Other works ==
Withers is also a country/folk singer-songwriter. In 2011, together with fellow composer and guitarist, Jeff Marshall, she released the album No Romeo under the name Autumn Lee. She followed that up with her second album, Angel Made of Steel, as well as the single, Invisible.

Aside from performing, Withers has a passion for helping empower other women. In 2015 she founded the Hollywood Women's Collective, a "women's community dedicated to supporting women creatives and engendering a spirit of support, collaboration, and giving back."

During the 2017 US presidential election, Withers lent her voice in support of her former fellow Radio City Rockettes dancers. At the time, Trump's derogatory comments about women in the leaked Access Hollywood tape were a hot topic and the Rockettes were said to be being pressured to perform at the inauguration event under threat of financial penalty or firing, despite several being upset at what would be a tantamount endorsement of Trump's treatment of women. Despite Trump's more recent questioning of the tape's veracity, Billy Bush, then host of Access Hollywood, declared that it was indeed genuine.

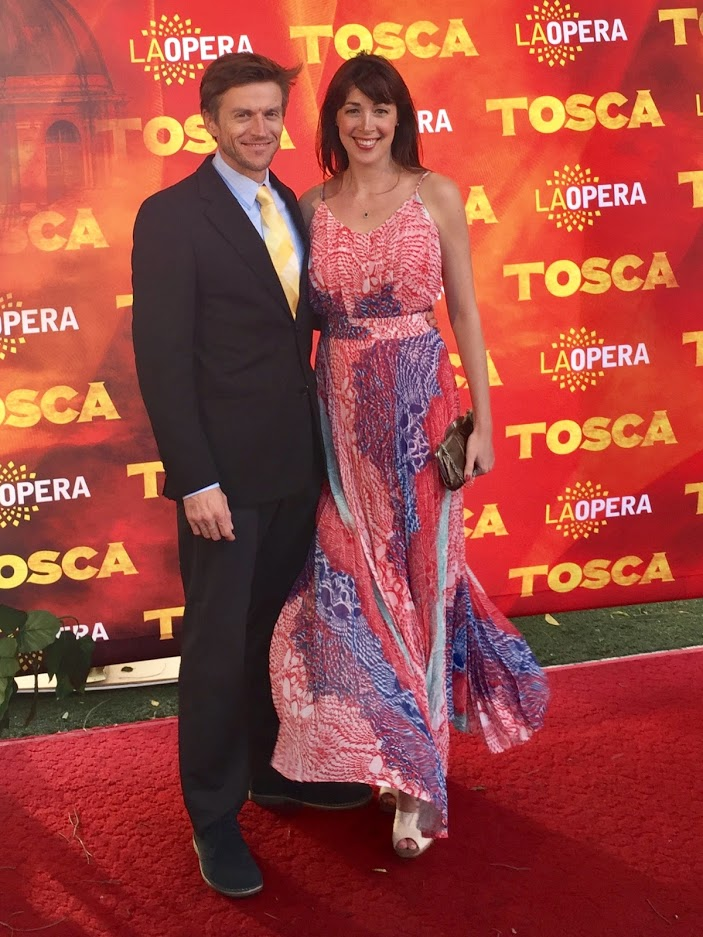
Gideon Emery and Autumn Withers attend Tosca at LA Opera at the Dorothy Chandler Pavilion in Los Angeles on 27 April 2017.

== Filmography ==
=== Film ===
Year	Title	Role	Notes
1989	Shag	Girl	uncredited
2006	Pocahauntus	Indian Princess #2	
2006	Private Dancer	Excited Woman	Short film
2007	Almaz Black Box	Emily Abbot	
2008	The Curious Case of Benjamin Button	Dancer	uncredited
2010	Going Maverick: The Sarah Palin Story	Katie Couric / Various	Short film; voice role
2010	Brooke Beckman: Haunted MD	Rebecca Charlotte Thomas	Short film
2011	Clown Wanted	Policewoman	Short film; voice role
2011	Autumn and George	Autumn	Short film; also producer and writer
2012	She, Who Excels in Solitude	Nurse Janet	Short film
2012	Hysteria	Reporter	Short film
2012	Monarch	Simone	Short film
2013	Marital Bliss	Deb	Short film
2013	Catherine	Jean	Short film
2015	Any Day	Diane	
2016	Worst-Case Scenario, Inc.	Stella	Short film
2018	Avalanche	Nina	also producer
2020	Cabin Fever	Teacher Chelsea	
2022	The Fury		

=== Television ===
Year	Title	Role	Notes
2008	The Bold and the Beautiful	Nurse	Episode: #1.5302; uncredited
2009	The Battery's Down	LA Courtney	Episode: "Losing My Mind"
2011	How to Pick Up Girls	Sue	Episode: "In the Lounge"
2012	Army Wives	Nurse Sheila Conlin	Episode: "General Complications"
2013	Modern Family	Mrs. Ebbert	Episode: "Career Day"
2013	Catherine	Jean	Recurring role; 10 episodes
2014	Growing Up Fisher	Cynthia	Episode: "Secret Lives of Fishers"
2014	Grey's Anatomy	Marilyn	Episode: "Fear (of the Unknown)"
2014	Masters of Sex	Sandra	Episode: "Asterion"
2016	E&N with Ed Neusbit: The Awards Special	Connie Cloud / Dawn Hudson	Television film
2021	FBI: Most Wanted	Linda Smith	Episode: "Toxic"
2021	Grow	Ilse	Recurring role; 4 episodes
2022	The Marvelous Mrs. Maisel	Ethel Kennedy	Episode: "Ethan... Esther... Chaim"
2022	Panhandle	Mrs. Ellis	Episode: "To Bell or Not To Bell?"

=== Web ===
Year	Title	Role	Notes
2015, 2020	E&N with Ed Neusbit	Kimberly Faith / Connie Cloud / Jared Kushner / Kayleigh McEnany / Dr. Deborah Birx	Recurring role, 10 episodes; also producer

=== Stage ===
Year	Title	Role	Notes
2007	Radio City Christmas Spectacular	2007 Radio City Rockette	

== Discography ==
- No Romeo (2011)
- Angel Made of Steel (2012)
- Invisible (2012)
