= Molly Zero =

1980 science fiction novel by Keith Roberts

First edition (publ. Gollancz)

Molly Zero is a work of science fiction written in the second person by Keith Roberts. Originally published as a novella in the 1977 collection Triax edited by Robert Silverberg, Molly Zero was later expanded into a full length novel and republished in 1980.

== Plot summary ==
Molly Zero is a novel in which Molly Zero flees a training school that operates for the ruling class of Britain set 200 years in the future.

== Reception ==
Dave Langford reviewed Molly Zero for White Dwarf #74, and stated that "Roberts' simple and human story leaves you to decide whether the price of compromise (which includes all Molly's innocence) is too great."

== Reviews ==
- Review by Paul Kincaid (1980) in Vector 99
- Review by Michael E. Stamm (1984) in Fantasy Review, August 1984
