= Pavane (novel) =

1968 science fiction novel by Keith Roberts

- First edition
- Author: Keith Roberts
- Cover artist: K. Roberts
- Language: English
- Genre: Science fiction, alternative history
- Publisher: Rupert Hart-Davis
- Publication date: 1968
- Publication place: United Kingdom
- Media type: book
- Pages: 285
- OCLC: 6754025

Pavane is an alternative history science fiction fix-up novel by British writer Keith Roberts, first published by Rupert Hart-Davis Ltd in 1968. Most of the original stories were published in Impulse. An additional story, "The White Boat", was added in later editions.

Comprising a cycle of linked stories set in Dorset, England, it depicts a 20th century in which the Catholic Church still has supremacy; in its timeline, Protestantism was destroyed during wars that resulted from the aftermath of the assassination of Queen Elizabeth in 1588.

== Overview ==
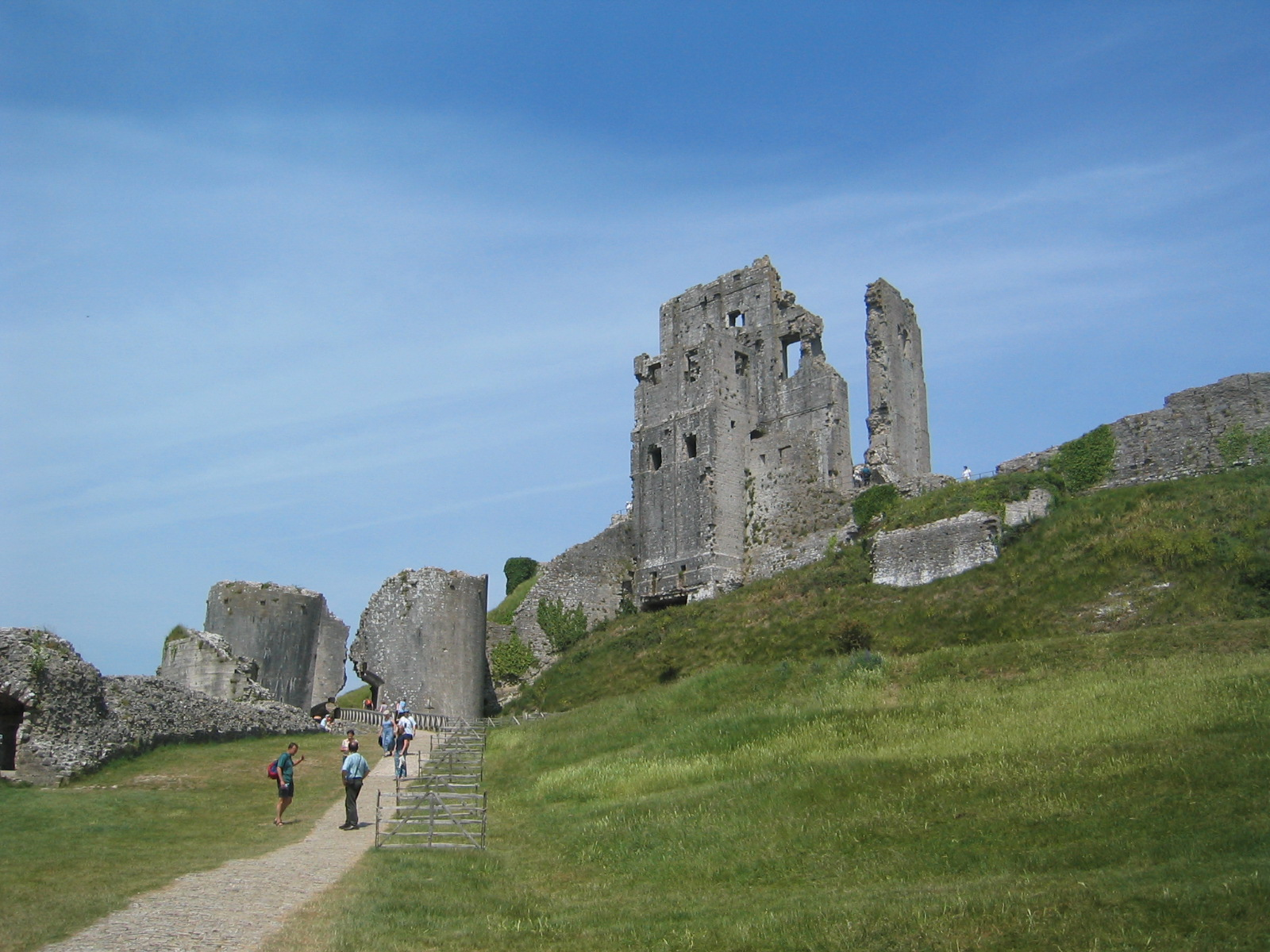
Ruins of Corfe Castle, "slighted" (dismantled) as in the story

The novel posits a history in which Queen Elizabeth I was assassinated just as the Spanish Armada was on its way. Protestant mobs attacked English Catholics who fought back in self-defense. With England engulfed in civil war, the Armada landed unopposed, the Spanish occupied England, suppressed Protestantism and imposed Roman Catholicism as the one and only religion. Without Protestant England, Spain prevented the Protestant Dutch Republic from attaining independence, while the German mercantile city states of the Holy Roman Empire that financed the Reformation were also suppressed. As a consequence, while Spanish power eventually wanes, the Catholic Church has no rivals and the pope becomes the effective secular, as well as spiritual, ruler over Europe. The Church thus also controls the restive "New World" (which approximates the United States in our timeline), as well as "Australasia", where James Cook planted the cobalt flag of the Throne of Peter, instead of the Union Flag, in the 18th century.

The social effects include a continuing feudal system and bans on innovation, particularly electricity, leading to a roughly mid-19th century technology with steam traction engines and mechanical semaphore telegraphy. Outlying areas are dangerous, with wild animals and occasional manifestations of the "Old Ones" or "People of the Hills" (supposed fairies) who leave crab-symbol graffiti. The stories take place at a period when the possibility of revolution is rumoured.

The location and flavour, nostalgic yet tragic in outlook, resemble a science-fictional equivalent of the fictionalized Wessex of Thomas Hardy (as in the Hardy stories, there are place-name differences; for instance, in Pavane Dorchester retains its Roman name, Durnovaria). Real geographical locations play a major role: Golden Cap is the site of a semaphore station, and the castle at Corfe is a key presence in the book.

Over all, the long arm of the popes reached out to punish and reward; the Church Militant remained supreme. But by the middle of the twentieth century widespread mutterings were making themselves heard. Rebellion was once more in the air ...

The title alludes to the stately and melancholy dance, the pavane, the book being divided thematically into measures and a coda.

After a brief prologue explaining the back-story, the stories are:

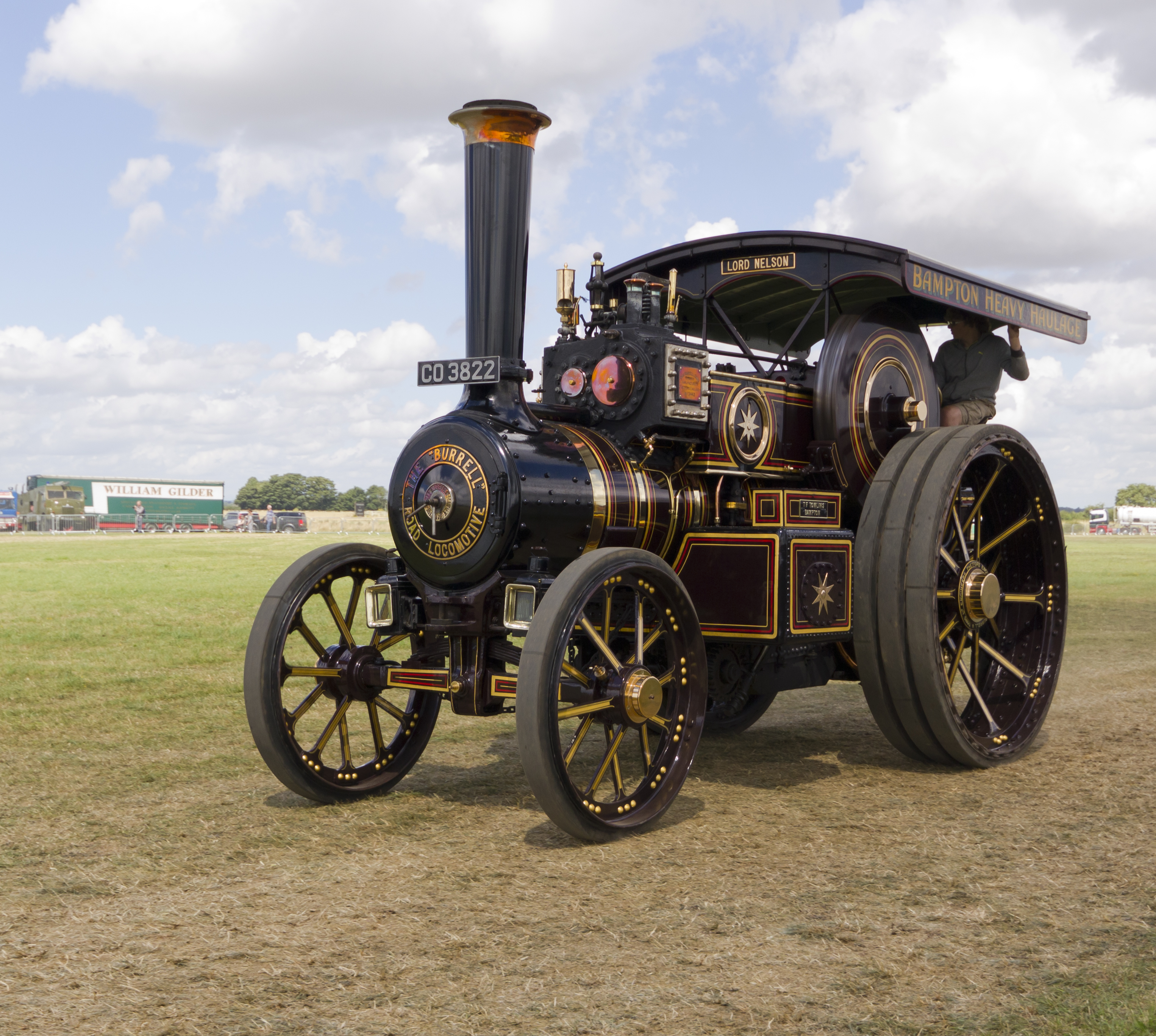
Burrell road locomotive, similar to Lady Margaret

- "The Lady Margaret": a lonely steam haulier meets a friend from his past.
- "The Signaller": an apprentice semaphore operator is assigned to a remote station.
- "The White Boat" (not in all editions): a discontented fisher girl is obsessed with a mysterious yacht.
- "Brother John": a monk becomes disaffected by the practices of the Inquisition.
- "Lords and Ladies": a woman's bitter memories are evoked at the deathbed of the haulier from the first story, who is her uncle.
- "Corfe Gate": an aristocrat, the daughter of the central female character in "Lords and Ladies", is involved in a regional rebellion.
- The "Coda" is set some years after the events of the final stories, and centres on the son of the seneschal to the female aristocrat from "Corfe Gate".

== Reception ==
Pavane soon found an important place in the alternative history subgenre of science fiction and the work's high reputation continues; The Cambridge Companion to Science Fiction assesses it as "now credited as the finest of all 'alternative histories'". Algis Budrys found the novel to be "a tapestry of a book; a marvel of storytelling", and concluded that, despite an unnecessary "Coda", it was "a truly wonderful work". In Science Fiction: The 100 Best Novels, however, the "Coda" is judged "very revealing": acting as the novel's epilogue, it explains that throughout history the Church was acting with foreknowledge of dangerous scientific developments in the twentieth century, and was trying to delay them.

== See also ==
- The Alteration
- Ruled Britannia
- Times Without Number
