= The Furies (Roberts novel) =

1966 novel by Keith Roberts

The Furies is a novel written by Keith Roberts and published in 1966. The story was adapted into a six-part thriller on BBC Radio 4 in May 1970.

== Plot summary ==
The Furies is a novel in which giant killer wasps strike the English countryside.

== Reception ==
Colin Greenland reviewed The Furies for Imagine magazine, and stated that "Roberts was already (in 1966) showing his talent for vivid description and detailed landscape, the scarred countryside of Wiltshire where our hero gets firmly dug in."

== Reviews ==
- Review by Judith Merril (1966) in The Magazine of Fantasy and Science Fiction, November 1966
- Review by Chris Priest (1967) in Vector 42
