= Kaeti & Company =

1986 collection

Kaeti & Company is a collection by Keith Roberts published in 1986.

== Plot summary ==
Kaeti & Company is a collection of 10 stories.

== Reception ==
Dave Langford reviewed Kaeti & Company for White Dwarf #79, and stated that "As a whole one might call it self-indulgent .... but in a 1000-copy limited edition, why not? Self-indulgence from such as Aldiss or Roberts towers above the best efforts of many others."

== Reviews ==
- Review by David V. Barrett (1986) in Vector 132
- Review by Helen McNabb (1986) in Vector 132
- Review by Dan Chow (1986) in Locus, #306 July 1986
- Review by Charles de Lint (1987) in Fantasy Review, March 1987
