= The Lordly Ones =

The Lordly Ones is a collection by Keith Roberts published in 1986.

== Plot summary ==
The Lordly Ones is a collection of seven stories, four of which are science fiction, two are fantasy, and one is a ghost story.

== Reception ==
Dave Langford reviewed The Lordly Ones for White Dwarf #84, and stated that "Only Roberts could write a moving and horrowing post-holocaust tale set in a public lavatory... and then write another. Recommended."

== Reviews ==
- Review by Chris Morgan (1986) in Fantasy Review, November 1986
- Review by Mike Moir (1986) in Vector 135
- Review by David V. Barrett (1987) in Vector 138
