= Kiteworld =

Keith Roberts novel (published 1985)

Kiteworld is a novel by Keith Roberts published in 1985.

== Plot summary ==
Men fly in kites at the borders of their land to defend against demons of legend.

== Reception ==
Dave Langford reviewed Kiteworld for White Dwarf #69, calling it "Superlative stuff, even if the deux-ex-machina happy ending is a bit jarring."

== Reviews ==
- Review by Chris Morgan (1985) in Fantasy Review, July 1985
- Review by Faren Miller (1985) in Locus, #295 August 1985
- Review by Chris Bailey (1985) in Vector 128
- Review by Mary Gentle (1985) in Interzone, #14 Winter 1985/86
- Review by M. John Harrison (1985) in Foundation, #35 Winter 1985/1986, (1986)
- Review by Don D'Ammassa (1986) in Science Fiction Chronicle, #85 October 1986
