= Gráinne (novel) =

1987 novel by Keith Roberts

Gráinne is a novel by British writee Keith Roberts, published in 1987.

== Plot summary ==
Gráinne is a novel in which Alastair Bevan sees his one-time lover Gráinne achieve fame on television, establish a cult, and then die to achieve immortality as a myth.

== Reception ==
Dave Langford reviewed Gráinne for White Dwarf #90, and stated that "The final, haunting images effectively combined fairy mounds and World War III, but didn't overcome my frustration: Gráinne's barely-glimpsed story fails to conquer the dead weight of Bevan's autobiographical longueurs."

== Reviews ==
- Review by Helen McNabb (1987) in Vector 139
- Review by Lee Montgomerie (1987) in Interzone, #21 Autumn 1987
- Review by Don D'Ammassa (1988) in Science Fiction Chronicle, #101 February 1988
