= Wits Theatre Complex =

Building in South Africa

Coordinates: 26°11′27″S 28°1′49″E

The Wits Theatre Complex is a performing arts complex in Braamfontein, a suburb of Johannesburg, South Africa. It is part of the University of the Witwatersrand, although it also caters for professional companies, dance studios and schools. It is run by the university's Performing Arts Administration (PAA).

The Wits Theatre Complex opened in July 1983. Plans for the construction of the theatre complex were first announced ten years before that; in the interim, money for construction had been raised from public and private sources. Before the construction of the theatre complex, the Schools of Dramatic Art and Music had been staging productions in a building on campus called the Nunnery, a former convent. The Nunnery has been retained as a teaching venue.

The Wits Theatre Complex has three venues:

- the 367-seat Wits Theatre
- the 120-seat Amphitheatre
- the 120-seat Downstairs Theatre

In addition, the 1035-seat Great Hall is also used by the PAA, although it is not part of the Wits Theatre Complex.

== See also ==
- List of concert halls
- University of the Witwatersrand
