= Keith Roberts =

English science fiction author (1935–2000)

- Born: 20 September 1935; Kettering, Northamptonshire
- Died: 5 October 2000 (aged 65); Salisbury, Wiltshire, England
- Occupations: Writer, artist, graphic designer
- Writing career
- Pen name: Alistair Bevan, John Kingston, David Stringer
- Genres: Science fiction, fantasy, historical fiction, thriller
- Notable work: Pavane

Keith John Kingston Roberts (20 September 1935 – 5 October 2000) was an English science fiction author. He began publishing with two stories in the September 1964 issue of Science Fantasy magazine, "Anita" (the first of a series of stories featuring a teenage modern witch and her eccentric granny) and "Escapism".

Several of his early stories were written using the pseudonyms Alistair Bevan and David Stringer. His second novel Pavane, first published in 1968, which is a collection of linked stories, may be his most famous work: an alternative history novel in which the Catholic Church takes control of England following the assassination of Queen Elizabeth I.

Roberts wrote numerous novels and short stories and worked as an illustrator. His artistic contributions include covers and interior artwork for New Worlds and Science Fantasy, later renamed Impulse. He also edited the last few issues of Impulse although the nominal editor was Harry Harrison.

Roberts' first novel, The Furies, makes an appearance in the American TV series Bones in the third season's third episode "Death in the Saddle" (9 October 2007).

Roberts described himself as a political conservative and an anti-communist.

In later life, Roberts lived in Salisbury. He was diagnosed with multiple sclerosis in 1990, and died of its complications in October 2000. Obituaries recalled him as a talented but personally "difficult" author, with a history of disputes with publishers, editors and colleagues.

== Partial bibliography ==
=== Novels ===
- The Furies (1966) – a traditional UK disaster tale. Adapted into a six-part thriller on BBC Radio 4 in May 1970.
- Pavane (1968) – a collection of linked short stories
- Anita (1970) – a collection of linked short stories
- The Inner Wheel (1970) – a collection of linked short stories
- The Boat of Fate (1971) – a historical novel set in Britain at the end of the Roman Empire's power
- The Chalk Giants (1974) – a collection of linked short stories
- Molly Zero (1980) – a novel set in a dystopian future
- Kiteworld (1985) – originally published as linked short stories
- Kaeti & Company (1986) – linked short fiction
- Gráinne (1987) – slipstream fiction
- The Road to Paradise (1989) – a thriller, without fantastic elements
- Kaeti on Tour (1992) – linked short fiction
- Drek Yarman (2000) - a novel set in Kiteworld, serialized in Spectrum SF

=== Collections ===
- Machines and Men (1973)
  - "Escapism" (1964)
  - "Therapy 2000" (1969)
  - "Manscarer" (1966)
  - "Boulter's Canaries" (1965)
  - "Sub-Lim" (1965)
  - "Synth" (1966)
  - "The Deeps" (1966)
  - "Breakdown" (1966)
  - "The Pace That Kills" (1966)
  - "Manipulation" (1965)
- The Grain Kings (1976)
  - "Weihnachtsabend" (1972)
  - "The White Boat" (1966)
  - "The Passing of the Dragons" (1972)
  - "The Trustie Tree" (1973)
  - "The Lake of Tuonela" (1973)
  - "The Grain Kings" (1972)
  - "I Lose Medea" (1972)
- The Passing of the Dragons (1977) - selected stories from Machines and Men and The Grain Kings
- Ladies from Hell (1979)
  - "Our Lady of Desperation" (1979)
  - "The Shack at Great Cross Halt" (1977)
  - "The Ministry of Children" (1975)
  - "The Big Fans" (1977)
  - "Missa Privata" (1976)
- The Lordly Ones (1986)
  - "The Lordly Ones" (1980)
  - "Ariadne Potts" (1978)
  - "Sphairistike" (1984)
  - "The Checkout" (1981)
  - "The Comfort Station" (1980)
  - "The Castle on the Hoop" (1986)
  - "Diva" (1986)
- A Heron Caught in Weeds (1987) – poetry collection, edited by Jim Goddard
- Winterwood and Other Hauntings (1989) – ghost story collection, with an introduction by Robert Holdstock
  - "Susan" (1965)
  - "The Scarlet Lady" (1966)
  - "The Eastern Windows" (1967)
  - "Winterwood" (1974)
  - "Mrs. Cibber" (1989)
  - "The Snake Princess" (1973)
  - "Everything in the Garden" (1973)

=== Other ===
- The Natural History of the P.H. (1988) – short essay about the "Primitive Heroine"
- Irish Encounters: A Short Travel (1989) – essays about a trip to Ireland in 1978
- Lemady: Episodes of a Writer's Life (1997) – autobiography, with fictional elements

== Awards and nominations ==
=== Awards ===
- British Science Fiction Association Award 1982 – Short fiction: "Kitemaster" (Interzone, Spring 1982)
- British Science Fiction Association Award 1986 – Short fiction: "Kaeti and the Hangman" (Kaeti & Company)
- British Science Fiction Association Award 1986 – Artist: Keith Roberts
- British Science Fiction Association Award 1987 – Novel: Gráinne

=== Nominations ===
- Nebula Award 1971 – Best Novella: "The God House" (New Worlds Quarterly No. 1, 1971)
- British Science Fiction Association Award 1980 – Novel: Molly Zero
- Hugo Award 1981 – Best Novelette: "The Lordly Ones" (Fantasy & Science Fiction, March 1980)
- British Science Fiction Association Award 1985 – Novel: Kiteworld
- John W. Campbell Memorial Award 1986 (Joint 3rd place): Kiteworld
- Nebula Award 1987 – Best Novella: "The Tiger Sweater" (Fantasy & Science Fiction, October 1987)
- Arthur C. Clarke Award 1988: Gráinne
