= Kenneth Bulmer bibliography =

Bibliography of speculative fiction author and editor Kenneth Bulmer:

== Bibliography ==
=== Science fiction novels ===
==== Dray Prescot series (written as Alan Burt Akers and Dray Prescot) ====
Consists of eleven cycles (the last is unfinished), four stand-alone novels, and three stand-alone short stories as noted below. The first thirty-seven volumes were published by DAW Books from December 1972 – April 1988; print editions of the later volumes were initially published solely in German translation by Wilhelm Heyne Verlag from 1991–1998. English language ebooks of volumes 38–41 were later issued by the now-defunct electronic publisher Savanti from September 1995 – December 1998; ebooks of volumes 1–52 have since been issued by another electronic publisher, Mushroom eBooks. Publication was interrupted for close to six years between volumes 45 and 46 due to family illness and difficulty in locating the manuscripts. As of 5 February 2014 it was reported that all the missing manuscripts had been found except that for Demons of Antares (Book 46), which was being translated back into English from the German version, a process then "almost finished." Publication of the volume followed in June 2014, with the remaining volumes appearing at intervals during the remainder of the year. Volume 52 was published in November 2014. Bladud Books, a sister imprint of Mushroom eBooks, has published collected omnibus editions of all volumes in hardcover, paperback and ebook formats.

===== Delian cycle =====
- 1. Transit to Scorpio (Dec. 1972) ISBN 978-1-84319-333-3 (PDF)
- 2. The Suns of Scorpio (Apr. 1973)
- 3. Warrior of Scorpio (Aug. 1973)
- 4. Swordships of Scorpio (Dec. 1973)
- 5. Prince of Scorpio (Apr. 1974)

Collected in The Saga of Dray Prescot: The Delian Cycle (Apr. 2007) ISBN 978-1-84319-557-3 (hbk)

===== Havilfar cycle =====
- 6. Manhounds of Antares (Aug. 1974)
- 7. Arena of Antares (Dec. 1974)
- 8. Fliers of Antares (Apr. 1975)
- 9. Bladesman of Antares (Aug. 1975)
- 10. Avenger of Antares (Dec. 1975)
- 11. Armada of Antares (Apr. 1976)
- "Wizard of Scorpio" (Jul. 1976, in The DAW Science Fiction Reader) (stand-alone short story)

Collected in The Saga of Dray Prescot: The Havilfar Cycle I (Feb. 2009) and The Saga of Dray Prescot: The Havilfar Cycle II (Feb. 2009)

===== Krozair cycle =====
- 12. The Tides of Kregen (Aug. 1976)
- 13. Renegade of Kregen (Dec. 1976)
- 14. Krozair of Kregen (Apr. 1977)

Collected in The Saga of Dray Prescot: The Krozair Cycle (Feb. 2009)

===== Vallian cycle =====
- 15. Secret Scorpio (Dec. 1977)
- 16. Savage Scorpio (Apr. 1978)
- 17. Captive Scorpio (Aug. 1978)
- 18. Golden Scorpio (Dec. 1978)

Collected in The Saga of Dray Prescot: The Vallian Cycle (Apr. 2009)

===== Jikaida cycle =====
- 19. A Life for Kregen (Apr. 1979)
- 20. A Sword for Kregen (Aug. 1979)
- 21. A Fortune for Kregen (Dec. 1979)
- 22. A Victory for Kregen (Apr. 1980)

Collected in The Saga of Dray Prescot: The Jikaida Cycle (Aug. 2009)

===== Spikatur cycle =====
- 23. Beasts of Antares (Aug. 1980)
- 24. Rebel of Antares (Dec. 1980)
- 25. Legions of Antares (Aug. 1981)
- 26. Allies of Antares (Dec. 1981)

Collected in The Saga of Dray Prescot: The Spikatur Cycle (Mar. 2010)

===== Pandahem cycle =====
- 27. Mazes of Scorpio (Jun. 1982)
- "Green Shadows" (Aug. 1982) (stand-alone short story)
- "Lallia the Slave Girl" (Sep. 1982) (stand-alone short story)
- 28. Delia of Vallia (Dec. 1982) (stand-alone novel)
- 29. Fires of Scorpio (Apr. 1983)
- 30. Talons of Scorpio (Dec. 1983)
- 31. Masks of Scorpio (Apr. 1984)
- 32. Seg the Bowman (Oct. 1984) (stand-alone novel)

Collected in The Saga of Dray Prescot: The Pandahem Cycle I (May 2011) and The Saga of Dray Prescot: The Pandahem Cycle II (Jun. 2011)

===== Witch War cycle =====
- 33. Werewolves of Kregen (Jan. 1985)
- 34. Witches of Kregen (Apr. 1985)
- 35. Storm over Vallia (Aug. 1985) (stand-alone novel)
- 36. Omens of Kregen (Dec. 1985)
- 37. Warlord of Antares (Apr. 1988)

Collected in The Saga of Dray Prescot: The Witch War Cycle (Sep. 2011)

===== Lohvian cycle (originally published in German only) =====
- 38. Scorpio Reborn (Wiedergeborenes Scorpio, 1991; English ebook edition Sep. 1995)
- 39. Scorpio Assassin (Meuchelmörder von Scorpio, 1992; English ebook edition Feb. 1996)
- 40. Scorpio Invasion (Invasion von Scorpio, 1992; English ebook edition Aug. 1996)
- 41. Scorpio Ablaze (Scorpio in Flammen, 1992; English ebook edition Dec. 1998)
- 42. Scorpio Drums (Die Trommeln von Scorpio, 1992; English ebook edition Apr. 2008)
- 43. Scorpio Triumph (Der Triumph von Scorpio, 1993; English ebook edition Jun. 2008)

Collected in The Saga of Dray Prescot: The Lohvian Cycle I (Dec. 2011) and The Saga of Dray Prescot: The Lohvian Cycle II (Sep. 2012)

===== Balintol cycle (originally published in German only) =====
- 44. Intrigue of Antares (Die Intrige von Antares, 1993; English ebook edition Jul. 2008)
- 45. Gangs of Antares (Die Banditen von Antares, 1994; English ebook edition Jul. 2008)
- 46. Demons of Antares (Die Dämonen von Antares, 1994; English ebook edition Jun. 2014)
- 47. Scourge of Antares (Die Geißel von Antares, 1994; English ebook edition Jul. 2014)
- 48. Challenge of Antares (Die Fehde von Antares, 1995; English ebook edition Jul. 2014)
- 49. Wrath of Antares (Der Zorn von Antares, 1996; English ebook edition Aug. 2014)

Collected in The Saga of Dray Prescot: The Balintol Cycle I (Aug. 2015) and The Saga of Dray Prescot: The Balintol Cycle II (Aug. 2015)

===== Spectre cycle (originally published in German only) =====
- 50. Shadows over Kregen (Schatten über Kregen, 1996; English ebook edition Sep. 2014) (stand-alone novel)
- 51. Murder on Kregen (Mord auf Kregen, 1997; English ebook edition Oct. 2014)
- 52. Turmoil on Kregen (Aufruhr auf Kregen, 1997; English ebook edition Nov. 2014)

Collected in The Saga of Dray Prescot: The Spectre Cycle (Sep. 2015)

- 53. Betrayal on Kregen (Verrat auf Kregen, unpublished eleven page fragment)

==== Ryder Hook series (written as Tully Zetford) ====
The last six books in the series were published only in German, under Bulmer's real name. The first four books have also been published under his real name, collected in a single volume.

- Whirlpool of Stars (1974)
- The Boosted Man (1974)
- Star City (1974)
- The Virility Gene (1975)
  The Nova Man (Der Nova-Mann, 1987, Collection of the first four books)
- The Gervase Factor (Mission Galaxis, 1988)
- The Lost Fleet (Der Weltraum-Friedhof, 1988)
- Star Strike (Rebell der Sterne, 1988)
- Lure of the Novamen (Weltraum-Piraten, 1988)
- Citadel of Doom (Gefangen im All, 1988)
- Secret of the Novamen (Vermächtnis der Zukunft, 1988)

==== Keys to the Dimensions series ====
- The Key to Irunium (1967)
- The Key to Venudine (1968)
- The Wizards of Senchuria (1969)
- The Ships of Durostorum (1970)
- The Hunters of Jundagai (1971)
- The Chariots of Ra (1972)
- The Diamond Contessa (1983)

==== Odan the Half-God series (written as Manning Norvil) ====
- Dream Chariots (1977)
- Whetted Bronze (1978)
- Crown of the Sword God (1980)

==== Other science fiction novels ====
- Space Treason (1952) with A. V. Clarke
- Cybernetic Controller (1952) with A. V. Clarke
- Encounter in Space (1952)
- Zhorani (Master of the Universe) (1953) (as Karl Maras)
- Empire of Chaos (1953)
- Galactic Intrigue (1953)
- Space Salvage (1953)
- The Stars are Ours (1953)
- Mission to the Stars (1953) (as Philip Kent)
- Vassals of Venus (1953) (as Philip Kent)
- Challenge (1954)
- World Aflame (1954)
- Home Is the Martian (1954) (as Philip Kent)
- Slaves of the Spectrum (1954) (as Philip Kent)
- Peril from Space (1954) (as Karl Maras)
- City Under the Sea (1957)
- The Secret of ZI (1958) (a.k.a. The Patient Dark (1969))
- The Changeling Worlds (1959)
- The Earth Gods are Coming (1960) (a.k.a. Of Earth Foretold (1961))
- Defiance (1960)
- Beyond the Silver Sky (1961)
- Land Beyond the Map (1961)
- No Man's World (1961) (a.k.a. Earth's Long Shadow (exp 1962))
- The Fatal Fire (1962)
- The Wind of Liberty (1962)
- The Wizard of Starship Poseidon (1963)
- Demons' World (Ace Books, 1964) (later published as The Demons (Compact Books, 1965))
- The Million Year Hunt (1964)
- Behold the Stars (1965)
- Worlds for the Taking (1966)
- The Adjusted (1966)
- To Outrun Doomsday (1967)
- Cycle of Nemesis (1967)
- The Doomsday Men (1968)
- The Ulcer Culture (1969) (a.k.a. Stained-Glass World (1976))
- Kandar (1969)
- The Star Venturers (1969)
- Quench the Burning Stars (1970) (a.k.a. Blazon (expanded 1970))
- Star Trove (1970)
- Swords of the Barbarians (1970)
- The Electric Sword-Swallowers (1971)
- The Insane City (1971)
- On the Symb-Socket Circuit (1972)
- Roller Coaster World (1972)

=== Historical novels ===
==== The Vikings series (as Neil Langholm) ====
- 1. Blood Sacrifice (1975)
- 2. The Dark Return (1975)
- 3. Blood on the Sun / The Sun in the Night (1975)
- 4. Trail of Blood (1976)

==== Wolf's Head series (as Arthur Frazier) ====
- 1. Oath of Blood (1973)
- 2. The King's Death (1973)
- 3. A Light in the West (1973)
- 4. Viking Slaughter (1974)
- 5. A Flame in the Fens (1974)
- 6. An Axe in Miklagard (1975)

==== The Eagles – Gladiator series (as Andrew Quiller) ====
- 1. The Hill of the Dead (1976)
- 2. The Land of Mist (1976)
- 3. City of Fire (1976)
- 4. Blood on the Sand (1976)
- 5. Sea of Swords (1976)

==== Captain Shark series (as Richard Silver) ====
- 1. By Pirate's Blood (1975)
- 2. Jaws of Death (1975)

==== Fox series (as Adam Hardy) ====
- The Press Gang (1973)
- Prize Money (1973)
- The Siege (1973) (a.k.a. Savage Siege)
- Treasure (1973) (a.k.a. Treasure Map (1974))
- Powder Monkey (1973) (a.k.a. Sailor's Blood (1974))
- Blood for Breakfast (1974) (a.k.a. Sea of Gold)
- Court Martial (1974)
- Battle Smoke (1974)
- Cut and Thrust (1974)
- Boarders Away (1975)
- Fireship (1975)
- Blood Beach (1975)
- Sea Flame (1976)
- Close Quarters (1977)

==== Sea Wolf series (as Bruno Krauss) ====
- 1. Steel Shark (1978)
- 2. Shark North (1978)
- 3. Shark Pack (1978)
- 4. Shark Hunt (1980)
- 5. Shark Africa (1980)
- 6. Shark Raid (1982)
- 7. Shark America (1982)
- 8. Shark Trap (1982)

=== Western novels ===
==== Jubal Cade series (as Charles R. Pike) ====
- 11. Brand of Revenge (1978) (a.k.a. Brand of Vengeance (1980))

=== Adventure novels ===
- White-Out (1960) (as Ernest Corley)

==== Casca series (as Barry Sadler [house name]) ====
- 4. Panzer Soldier (1980)
- 22. The Mongol (1990)

==== Strike Force: Falklands series (as Adam Hardy) ====
- 1. Operation Exocet (1984)
- 2. Raider's Dawn (1984)
- 3. Red Alert (1984)
- 4. Recce Patrol (1985)
- 5. Covert Op (1985)
- 6. 'Ware Mines (1985)

=== Television tie-ins ===
==== The Professionals series (as Ken Blake) ====
- 1. Where the Jungle Ends (1978)*
- 2. Long Shot (1978)*
- 3. Stake Out (1978)*
- 4. Hunter Hunted (1978)*
- 5. Blind Run (1979)*
- 6. Fall Girl (1979)*
- 7. Hiding to Nothing (1980)
- 8. Dead Reckoning (1980)
- 9. No Stone (1980)
- 11. Spy Probe (1981)
- 12. Foxhole (1981)
- 13. The Untouchables (1982)
- 14. Operation Susie (1982)
- 15. You'll Be All Right (1982)*

Asterisked titles also published in hardback under Bulmer's own name

=== Children's books ===
- Pretenders (1972)

=== Collections ===
- The Wind of Liberty (1962) [novel plus 1 short story]

=== Anthologies (as editor) ===
- New Writings in SF 22 (1973)
- New Writings in SF 23 (1973)
- New Writings in SF 24 (1974)
- New Writings in SF 25 (1975)
- New Writings in SF 26 (1975)
- New Writings in SF 27 (1975)
- New Writings in SF 28 (1976)
- New Writings in SF 29 (1976)
- New Writings in SF 30 (1977)

== Non-fiction ==
- The True Book about Space Travel (1960) (with John Newman, as Kenneth Johns)
