= Avenger of Antares =

1975 novel by Kenneth Bulmer

- First edition cover
- Author: Kenneth Bulmer
- Cover artist: Jack Gaughan
- Language: English
- Series: Dray Prescot series
- Genre: Sword and planet
- Published: 1975
- Publisher: DAW Books
- Publication place: United States
- Media type: Print (Paperback)
- ISBN: 0879972084
- Preceded by: Bladesman of Antares
- Followed by: Armada of Antares

Avenger of Antares is a science fiction novel written by Kenneth Bulmer under the pseudonym of Alan Burt Akers. It is the tenth volume in his extensive Dray Prescot series of sword and planet novels, set on the fictional world of Kregen, a planet of the Antares star system in the constellation of Scorpio. It was first published by DAW Books in 1975.

The Dray Prescot series is made of several cycles of novels, each cycle essentially forming a series within the series. In addition to being the tenth volume in the series as a whole, Avenger of Antares is also the fifth of six volumes in the Havilfar Cycle. It is set on the fictional continent of Havilfar.

The 52 completed novels of the Dray Prescot series were written by Bulmer between 1972 and 1997, when a stroke stopped his writing, also the later Dray Prescot books, after 1988, were originally only published in German. The series is in the spirit of Edgar Rice Burroughs John Carter of Mars series.

== Plot summary ==
The book continues on directly from Bladesman of Antares with Prescot sailing towards Vallia on a Vallian galleon. The ship is attacked by a raider of the Shanks, a mysterious fish-like race. The galleon wins the fight but is then attacked and sunk by an air ship from Hamal. Shipwrecked, Prescot and his surviving companions decide to attack the Hamalian air base to steal an air ship. The Vallians return home while Prescot sets of for Hamal again to continue his spying.

Back in Ruathytu, Prescot contacts his old friends Rees and Chido again. He decides to drop his disguise as a simpleton and average swordsman and defeats a local noble, Vad Garnath, and a master sword fighter from Zenicce in a duel and wins heavily on the betting. To protect him against Garnath's revenge another friend introduces Prescot into the Temple of Lem, an evil religion he despises. He agrees to follow along in order to learn more about it. On his return to Rees and Chido he learns that the former's oldest son has been murdered and his daughter Saffi kidnapped by the orders of Garnath and with the help of the Strom Rosil, a Kataki, a race predominantly engaged in the slave trade.

With the help of the Wizard Que-si-Rening Prescot discovers the destination of Saffi and sets out to rescue her. His mission takes him back to the island of Faol where he is captured and once more ends up in the slave caves, a place first described in Manhounds of Antares. Prescot escapes together with another slave and confronts the slave master to gain information on Saffi. He also frees the pregnant Jiklo Mellow, one of the Manhounds of Faol, who joins him after killing the slave master and permanently changes his opinion on her race.

In disguise Precot travels to Smerdislad, the fortress of the Kov of Faol, where he hopes to find Saffi. He makes the acquaintance of Phu-si-Yantong, a powerful Wizard of Loh and future enemy of Prescot. He finds Saffi in the slave quarters and frees her and, on their way out, he overhears by chance a conversation between the Phu-si-Yantong, Garnath and Rosil. He learns of their plans to take power in Hamal and to conquer the islands of Pandahem and Vallia, but also hears of the nine Hamalian nobles who are in charge of the secret of the flying boats propulsion.

Prescot is wounded and poisoned by a dagger but fights, together with Saffi, for their freedom. Eventfully they are rescued by the men of Trylon Rees, who followed Prescot, and clean out the slave caves and destroy the Manhounds of Faol. Barely recovered, Prescot returns home to Valka with the Jiklo Mellow and her newly born twins by his side.

== Publishing ==
The book was first published in English in December 1975. It was first published in German in 1978 as Der Rächer von Antares. In 2006 the book was published as an E-book by Mushroom Books.

== Book covers ==
The cover of the original US edition was illustrated by Jack Gaughan, the first German edition by Michael Whelan. The second German edition was illustrated by Ken Kelly.
