= Armada of Antares =

1976 novel by Kenneth Bulmer

- First edition cover
- Author: Kenneth Bulmer
- Cover artist: Michael Whelan
- Language: English
- Series: Dray Prescot series
- Genre: Sword and planet
- Published: 1976
- Publisher: DAW Books
- Publication place: United States
- Media type: Print (Paperback)
- ISBN: 0879972270
- Preceded by: Avenger of Antares
- Followed by: The Tides of Kregen

Armada of Antares is a science fiction novel by British writer Kenneth Bulmer under the pseudonym of Alan Burt Akers. It is the eleventh volume in his extensive Dray Prescot series of sword and planet novels, set on the fictional world of Kregen, a planet of the Antares star system in the constellation of Scorpio. It was first published by DAW Books in 1976.

The Dray Prescot series is made of several cycles of novels, each cycle essentially forming a series within the series. In addition to being the eleventh volume in the series as a whole, Armada of Antares is also the last of six volumes in the Havilfar Cycle. It is set on the fictional continent of Havilfar as well as the islands of Pandahem and Valka.

The 52 completed novels of the Dray Prescot series were written by Bulmer between 1972 and 1997, when a stroke stopped his writing, also the later Dray Prescot books, after 1988, were originally only published in German. The series is in the spirit of Edgar Rice Burroughs John Carter of Mars series.

== Plot summary ==
The book continues on from Avenger of Antares with Prescot being at home in his fortress in Valka with his wife and children. Attacked by four assassins in his own garden he defeats them and captures one but the latter is himself assassinated before he can talk.

Employing the help of Evold Scavander, a wise man of Valka Prescot persuades the research into the contents of the two boxes in the flying boats which cause them to fly and makes some progress. When a merchant ship from Pandahem is captured Prescot learns that Vitridia, the female pirate he once served with in Swordships of Scorpio is still alive and active but that the fight against Hamal is becoming ever more desperate. Prescot and the Emperor raise an army of 15,000 as an assistance force to help the nations of Pandahem. He parts from Delia, now pregnant with their second set of twins and heads for Tomboram to assist Kov Pando.

At the Battle of Tomor Peak Prescot's army defeats a 20,000-strong Hamalian force. He encounters Pando and his mother Tilda after the battle but is not recognised by them. During the night he accidentally walks into Rees who was captured during the battle and is now escaping. In his identity of Hamun Prescot joins Rees and they reach the Hamalian lines. From there Prescot, Rees and Chido return to Ruathytu.

In a tavern in the capital the three watch a fight between Apims, humans, and Diffs, the non-human races of Kregen and see a stranger arrive and turn the battle for the humans. Prescot recognises him as an agent of the Savanti and learns that they are called Savapim. He befriends the Savapim, another Earth man, making him believe that Prescot is one of theirs. Prescot learns a number of things without disclosing his own origins, story and name.

Prescot volunteers to deliver a letter for a cousin of Chido's to the Volgendrin, hoping to find further information there on the flying boats and unawares of what the Volgendrin really are. He learns that they are flying islands when he accidentally jumps over the edge and is barely rescued. He learns more about the purpose of the Volgendrin but than, ready to depart, is recognised by Ornol ham Feoste, Kov of Apulad, as Chaadur who the former blames for the murder of his wife. Prescot attempts to deny his former identity but is forced to fight and flee. He temporarily escapes but is than captured and eventually taken for trial to Ruathytu.

Condemned to death and torture Prescot is spared when he is recognised by the former Kov of Falinur, Naghan Furtway. Instead he is taken to the Queen who decides to drag him through the streets during her coronation parade as Empress, tied to a Calsany, a donkey-like animal. Back in the dungeons Prescot is freed by the Kataki Strom Rosil, under orders of Phu-si-Yantong. Prescot soon overpowers the Katakis but spares Rosil who escapes and the former heads off towards Vallia. Prescot assembles his new air armada of flying ships and heads for Jholaix in north Western Pandahem, the last area not yet conquered by Hamal and still held by Prescot's expeditionary force. In the following Battle of Jholaix Prescot's forces are successful in defeating Hamal and freeing Pandahem. A peace treaty is hinted at and Prescot returns home to Valka and Delia.

== Publishing ==
The book was first published in English in April 1976. It was first published in German in 1978 as Die fliegenden Städte von Antares. In 2006 the book was published as an E-book by Mushroom Books.

== Book covers ==
The cover of the original US edition was illustrated by Michael Whelan, the first German edition by Vincent Segrelles. The second German edition was illustrated by Thomas Thiemeyer.
