= Krozair of Kregen =

1977 novel by Kenneth Bulmer

- First edition cover
- Author: Kenneth Bulmer
- Cover artist: Josh Kirby
- Language: English
- Series: Dray Prescot series
- Genre: Sword and planet
- Published: 1977
- Publisher: DAW Books
- Publication place: United States
- Media type: Print (Paperback)
- ISBN: 0879972882
- Preceded by: Renegade of Kregen
- Followed by: Secret Scorpio

Krozair of Kregen is a science fiction novel written by Kenneth Bulmer under the pseudonym of Alan Burt Akers. It is the fourteenth book in his extensive Dray Prescot series of sword and planet novels, set on the fictional world of Kregen, a planet of the Antares star system in the constellation of Scorpio. It was first published by DAW Books in 1977.

The Dray Prescot series is made of several cycles of novels, each cycle essentially forming a series within the series. In addition to being the fourteenth volume in the series as a whole, Krozair of Kregen is also the last of three volumes in the Krozair Cycle. It is set in the fictional Eye of the World on the continent of Turismond .

The 52 completed novels of the Dray Prescot series were written by Bulmer between 1972 and 1997, when a stroke stopped his writing, also the later Dray Prescot books, after 1988, were originally only published in German. The series is in the spirit of Edgar Rice Burroughs John Carter of Mars series.

== Plot summary ==
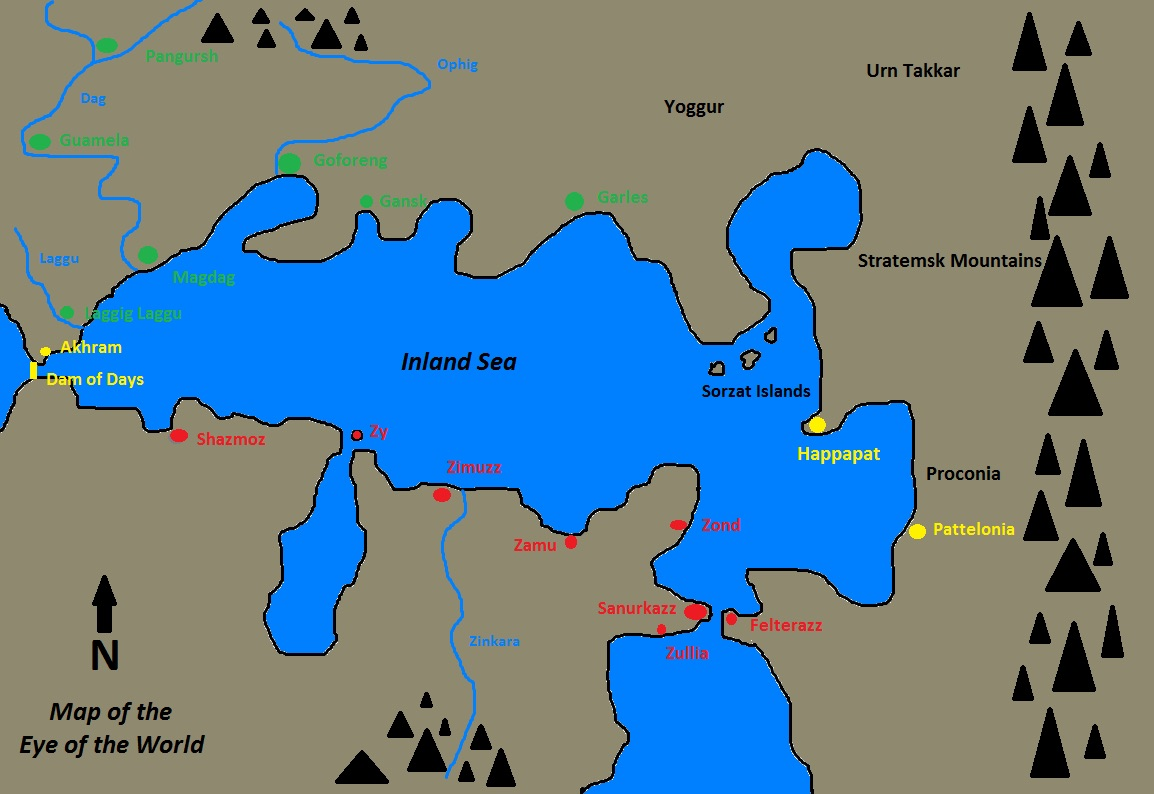
Map of the Eye of the World

The book directly follows Renegade of Kregen with Prescot being made an oar slave on a Magdagian galley and still trying to come to terms with the death of his daughter Velia. After some time Prescot, still using the name of Dak, is reunited with Duhrra, who had been captured when his ship was taken, and a young man, Vax. Prescot learns that Zena Iztar had helped Duhrra to a new hand, a prosthetic quite beyond the skills of local doctors.

Prescot and his companions break their chains and free all the slaves on their ship, liberating two more vessels in the process. Prescot takes command of one of the three ships. When Vax gets drunk celebrating their new freedom he reveals that he is Jaidur of Valka, youngest son of Pur Dray, who he hates for abandoning his mother and ruining his chances becoming a Krozair. Prescot is surprised that he has another son and daughter, Jaidur and Dayra, they having been born after he was exiled to Earth. Eventually, to prevent Vax from going to Magdag, Prescot breaks the news to him that his sister Velia has been killed, without disclosing the fact that he is his father and knows of his true identity. Prescot is spied on by the Gdoinye once more and discovers that Vax, like Drak before, can see the bird, though nobody else can.

Traveling east Prescot and his men learn that Zandikar is under siege, that the City's King has been slain and a usurper holds the throne. They realize that, should the city fall the road to Holy Sanurkazz, chief city of Zair, will be open to the enemy. They therefore decide to head for Zandikar. Prescot confronts the usurper's men when they come to take the food his ship carries. He visits the great-granddaughter of the former King, Miam, and learns that she and his son Zeg are in love. Miam is unaware of Prescot's true identity. He overthrows the usurper and in his place installs Miam as Queen.

Through treachery a gate to the city is almost opened but a Savapim, a servant of the Savanti, saves the situation. Prescot realizes that the Savanti have taken the side of the Zairians. He prepares traps for the attackers and successfully holds the city. Eventually a messenger arrives with news that Zimuzz is about to fall but that Prince Drak is arriving soon with an army from Vallia, equipped with flying boats. Prescot realizes the siege has come to a decisive stage when King Genod arrives with an armada of flying boats and saddle birds, against which Zandikar is defenseless. Prescot sets out to address this problem with a crew of men. They encounter a galley from Magdag and are saved by another galley, led by Pur Zeg, his middle son. Like Vax, Zeg hates his father but also does not recognize him. Instead the two almost come to blows before parting to carry on their task. Prescot is greatly impressed by his son and saddened about the years lost.

After reaching the coast near the enemy positions Prescot leaves his men and enters the Grodnim camp, again assuming the alias of Gadak. He meets Grogor and through him gains access to Gafard and King Genod and manages to enter their flying boat for a reconnaissance mission. Gafard is surprised to see Gadak again, and finally, when Prescot adds the pieces together for him, recognizes the latter is Pur Dray and the father of his late beloved wife. Gafard tackles the King and throws them both overboard, dying the same way Velia had. During this Prescot briefly glimpses an attack by the Gdoinye on the Savanti dove.

As the Grodnim air fleet prepares to attack the Vallian fliers arrive just in time, with Drak as their leader. He lands and Prescot for the first time in 21 years sees his oldest son. Drak recognizes the similarities between Dak and his father and is confused by it. The final assault of the Grodnim against Zandikar with flying boats pushes the defenders close to defeat with a gate falling when an air armada from Valka led by Delia takes the day and destroys the besieging army. Prescot is finally reunited with Delia and his sons learn his true identity. He has to break to Delia the news of Velia's death, while she informs him of the birth of a new daughter.

From Zandikar Prescot, his family and friends head to Zy where he argues his case for lifting the Apushniad against him. He succeeds, and also has Jaidur admitted to Krozair status.

== Publishing ==
The book was first published in English in December 1976. It was first published in German in 1980 as Krozair von Kregen. In 2007 the book was published as an E-book by Mushroom Books.

== Book covers ==
The cover of the original US edition was illustrated by Josh Kirby, the first German edition by Mehmet Tunali, the second US edition by Michael Whelan and the second German edition by Chris Achilleos.
