= Fliers of Antares =

1975 novel by Kenneth Bulmer

- First edition cover
- Author: Kenneth Bulmer
- Cover artist: Jack Gaughan
- Language: English
- Series: Dray Prescot series
- Genre: Sword and planet
- Published: 1975
- Publisher: DAW Books
- Publication place: United States
- Media type: Print (Paperback)
- ISBN: 0879971657
- Preceded by: Arena of Antares
- Followed by: Bladesman of Antares

Fliers of Antares is a science fiction novel written by Kenneth Bulmer under the pseudonym of Alan Burt Akers. It is the eighth volume in his extensive Dray Prescot series of sword and planet novels, set on the fictional world of Kregen, a planet of the Antares star system in the constellation of Scorpio. It was first published by DAW Books in 1975.

The Dray Prescot series is made of several cycles of novels, each cycle essentially forming a series within the series. In addition to being the eighth volume in the series as a whole, Fliers of Antares is also the third of six volumes in the Havilfar Cycle. It is set on the fictional continent of Havilfar.

The 52 completed novels of the Dray Prescot series were written by Bulmer between 1972 and 1997, when a stroke stopped his writing, also the later Dray Prescot books, after 1988, were originally only published in German. The series is in the spirit of Edgar Rice Burroughs John Carter of Mars series.

== Plot summary ==
The book continues directly on from Arena of Antares with Prescot, Delia and their friends escaping Hyrklana in a flying boat. On their journey over the sea Prescot is accidentally thrown off the boat during a storm and manages to swim to safety. He reaches a little village of the semi-human Lamnias where he is welcomed. He is however tricked and enslaved alongside an annual set number of youth from the village. The slave masters, another half-human race, Katakis, attempt to shoot down the flying boat of Prescot's friends who are in search of him but he is able to warn them. The flying boat departs and Prescot remains a slave.

Sold to the Heavenly Mines in the Empire of Hamal, where the raw ore is mined for the flying boat propulsion, Prescot falls into the monotony of the hard labor, almost forgetting escape. Eventually he recovers and starts planning an escape when he is once more teleported away by the Star Lords. He finds himself in the unusual situation of arriving somewhere without having to fight but is soon moved again, further back in time, the Star Lords apparently having blundered his teleportation.

This time, still at the same location, he has to rescue a palace official, Ortyg Fellin Coper, from an attack. Grateful of his help, he becomes the formers guest in the capital of Djanduin, a land populated by the four armed Djang, a warrior race, and the two armed Obdjang, an administrator race. He learns that Djanduin is under almost constant attack by neighbouring Gorgrendrin. He also learns, by observation of the position of the two Suns to each other that he has been sent ten years into the past. Prescot decides to sit out this time and not to get involved into local politics and wars.

Prescot watches Djanduin fall deeper into chaos, with ever-changing Kings. Eventually he decides, initially out of boredom, to become king himself. He becomes a field commander of an army and eventually marches on the capital, defeats the current king, and is crowned king of Djanduin. Seven years have passed by then and Prescot spends another three rebuilding the country. Satisfied with his work he installs his friend Ortyg Fellin Coper as regent and departs in a flyer to reunite with Delia now that the timelines have converged again.

Prescots flier breaks down on the way and he is visited by the Gdoinye the messenger bird of the Everoinye, the Star Lords. He reveals to Prescot that there is another task for him and that they demand another year of him after which he will be free, for a time. Prescot neither agrees nor disagrees, wondering if he could resist the Star Lords, and is soon teleported away. Prescot arrives on the hill side of an erupting volcano and decides that his task must be to save the town below or its inhabitants. He forces the local leader into commanding a rescue effort which succeeds. He learns that he is in a remote part of the Empire of Hamal but finds himself taken captive alongside two new friends he has made for threatening the local leader.

The three escape quickly and reach to Sumbakir, where one of them, Avec, worked in the flying boat factories. Prescot also finds employment there in the hope of learning the secret of how the flying boat propulsion operates. He aroused the interest of Kovneva Esme, wife of the Kov in charge of the factories. Prescot is taken to her chambers but finds himself disgusted with the way she treats her female slaves. He frees the slaves, kills Esmes guard but is unable to stop one of the slaves from killing the Kovneva. He helps the three slave girls to escape, then unsuccessfully investigates the secret parts of the factory. He makes a narrow escape and then, with the time lines finally converged, reunites with his friends, after an eleven-year absence for Prescot, while only hours have passed for Delia.

== Publishing ==
The book was first published in English in April 1975. It was first published in German in 1977 as Die Flieger von Antares. In 2006 the book was published as an E-book by Mushroom Books.

== Book covers ==
The cover of the original US edition was illustrated by Jack Gaughan, the first German edition by Guntram Holdgrün. The second German and US editions were illustrated by Richard Hescox.
