= Transit to Scorpio =

1972 novel by Kenneth Bulmer

- Cover of first edition
- Author: Kenneth Bulmer
- Cover artist: Tim Kirk
- Language: English
- Series: Dray Prescot series
- Genre: Sword and planet
- Publisher: DAW Books
- Publication date: 1972
- Publication place: United States
- Media type: Print (Paperback)
- ISBN: 0860078027
- Preceded by: none
- Followed by: The Suns of Scorpio

Transit to Scorpio is a science fiction novel by British writer Kenneth Bulmer, written under the pseudonym of Alan Burt Akers. It is the first book in his Dray Prescot series of sword and planet novels, set on the fictional world of Kregen, a planet of the Antares star system in the constellation of Scorpio. It was first published by DAW Books in 1972.

Bulmer's choice of the setting for the book, and for the series as a whole, is a subtle tribute to the Martian series of Edgar Rice Burroughs, the prototypical Sword and Planet romance. The star Antares, similar in brightness and hue to the planet Mars in the night sky, was given its name (meaning "like Mars") by early astronomers to compare it to and help distinguish it from the planet. Bulmer is signalling that his series is similar to that of his model. The Dray Prescot series is made of several cycles of novels, each cycle essentially forming a series within the series. In addition to being the first volume in the series as a whole, Transit to Scorpio is the initial volume in the Delian Cycle, which introduces the reader to a number of different Kregen locales as Prescot struggles to find his place in this strange new world and to win the hand of Delia, the love of his life.

== Plot summary ==
The novel features the story of Dray Prescot, an English sailor of Lord Nelson's navy, and his miraculous teleportation to the planet Kregen. There he is trained as an agent for the mysterious Savanti, an apparently benevolent secret society devoted to improving the lot of humanity among the many intelligent species of Kregen. Among the benefits conferred on him is immersion in an apparently miraculous pool, Kregen's equivalent of the Fountain of Youth, which heals all wounds and confers a greatly extended lifespan on the bather. During Prescot's sojourn among the Savanti an offhand reference is made to the continent of Gah in Kregen's opposite hemisphere, whose distasteful customs are an obvious dig at another sword and planet series, the Gor series of John Norman.

Prescot falls from grace among his hosts for supplying forbidden aid to Delia, princess of the island empire of Vallia, who has been brought to the Savanti as an injured supplicant. Defying their decision not to help her, he takes her to the healing pool and cures her. In consequence, he is banished back to Earth. While Prescott spends five years on Earth only a day has passed for Delia, as he later learns.

Later, he is returned to Kregen through the agency of the Star Lords, an even more mysterious group of apparently god-like beings, whose motivations are unknown, but apparently in opposition to the human Savanti. Prescot becomes a pawn in the Star Lords' schemes, sent willy-nilly to various locations on the planet to serve their ends and capriciously returned to Earth when his task is done or he manages to offend them. Despite this handicap he usually rises to a position of power in whatever society he is thrust into. Thrown back into contact with Delia, he is even able to renew and further his relationship with her. He eventually becomes the leader of the clansmen of Felschraung and Lord of Strombor in the city of Zenicce and learns that Delia of Delphond is in reality the daughter of the Emperor of Vallia, a powerful island nation. At the moment of triumph however he is returned to Lisbon on Earth.

Important locales introduced in this novel include the hidden city of the Savanti, the northern plains of the continent of Segesthes, and the city state of Zenicce on the same continent. It also introduces the dove, used by the Savanti to monitor Dray Prescot, and the Gdoinye, a colourful bird of prey send by the Star Lords for the same task.

== Reception ==
Lester del Rey described the story as "pretty standard," saying the novel "isn't bad -- but I didn't find it particularly good either."
