= Bladesman of Antares =

1975 novel by Kenneth Bulmer

- First edition cover
- Author: Kenneth Bulmer
- Cover artist: Jack Gaughan
- Language: English
- Series: Dray Prescot series
- Genre: Sword and planet
- Published: 1975
- Publisher: DAW Books
- Publication place: United States
- Media type: Print (Paperback)
- ISBN: 1351001590
- Preceded by: Fliers of Antares
- Followed by: Avenger of Antares

Bladesman of Antares is a science fiction novel by British writer Kenneth Bulmer, written under the pseudonym of Alan Burt Akers. It is the ninth book in his Dray Prescot series of sword and planet novels, set on the fictional world of Kregen, a planet of the Antares star system in the constellation of Scorpio. It was first published by DAW Books in 1975.

The Dray Prescot series is made of several cycles of novels, each cycle essentially forming a series within the series. In addition to being the ninth volume in the series as a whole, Bladesman of Antares is also the fourth of six volumes in the Havilfar Cycle. It is set on the fictional continent of Havilfar.

The 52 completed novels of the Dray Prescot series were written by Bulmer between 1972 and 1997, when a stroke stopped his writing, also the later Dray Prescot books, after 1988, were originally only published in German. The series is in the spirit of Edgar Rice Burroughs John Carter of Mars series.

== Plot summary ==
The book follows on almost directly from Fliers of Antares with Prescot journeying back to Havilfar and the Empire of Hamal after an undisclosed time back in Valka. He narrowly escapes a storm and then comes to the rescue of a village attacked by flutsmen, mercenaries mounted on large birds on a slaving raid. He enjoys the hospitality of the remote Paline Valley and its master, Naghan ham Farthytu, while he recovers. He leaves the valley but returns soon after to find it once more under attack. Prescot beats of the attackers but finds almost all of the valleys inhabitants killed and Naghan dying. To fulfil the dying man's wish he accepts to take on his dead sons identity and become Hamun ham Farthytu.

Prescot continues his journey to the capital of Hamal, Ruathytu, exploring the country in the process, in company of Nulty, servant of Naghan and sole survivor of the valley, disguised as Amak of the Paline Valley. He finally reaches the capital but quickly makes enemies with another noble and is challenged to a duel. While preparing for it Prescot is once more teleported away by the Star Lords, back to Earth. He spends an undisclosed time there, mainly in the United States before being returned to Kregen. He is sent to rescue a group of Djang under attack by slavers and beats them off. From there he returns to the capital of Djanduin, his Kingdom. He receives news that the Empire of Hamal has become even more expansionist and now refuses to sell flying boats abroad, instead purchasing boats from Hyrklana as well.

Prescot travels to Migladrin to see how events there have progressed, meets Mog the Mighty, the high priestess of the country again and then returns to Valka to reunite with Delia. Once more he travels to Hamal and, when his flying boat breaks down he makes the acquaintance of the aristocrats Rees ham Harshur, Trylon of the Golden Wind, a Numim, a race of lion-like men. He perceives Prescot to be "no fighting man", a disguise the later is trying to cultivate in Hamal in order to further his spying efforts. He learns that the Trylon is a supporter of Queen Thylli who had overthrown her uncle, the Emperor and was awaiting her own coronation as Empress.

Prescot joins the circle of friends of Trylon Rees and continues to pretend to be unskilled in sword fighting while attempting to learn the secrets of the flying boats by night by breaking into the heavily guarded factories. He works in the factories for a while but is unable to discover more. Instead he encounters his former servant Nulty, now a slave, and frees him. His adventures in the capital continue and he even rescues a Kovneva, Serea of Piraju, during an excursion to the countryside, unawares that she in reality is the Queen. Prescot too introduces himself by a false name, as Bagor ti Hemtland.

He continues his efforts to learn the flying boats secret, now through bribery and has some success but then is caught and sentenced as a thief rather than a spy. Enslaved he is eventually called before the Queen who recognised his false name of Bagor on a prisoner list. After a time as prisoner Prescot is abducted by the men of King Doghamrei who wishes to marry the Queen and is jealous of Prescot. Prescot is to be dumped from an air ship over the ocean during an attack on two Vallian galleons but manages to escape, save one of the ships, destroy the attacking air ships of Hamal and escape on board of the galleon.

== Publishing ==
The book was first published in English in August 1975. It was first published in German in 1977 as Die Waffenbrüder von Antares. In 2006 the book was published as an E-book by Mushroom Books.

== Book covers ==
The cover of the original US edition was illustrated by Jack Gaughan, the first German edition by Eddie Jones. The second German edition was illustrated by Ken Kelly.
