= The Tides of Kregen =

1976 novel by Kenneth Bulmer

- First edition cover
- Author: Kenneth Bulmer
- Cover artist: Michael Whelan
- Language: English
- Series: Dray Prescot series
- Genre: Sword and planet
- Published: 1976
- Publisher: DAW Books
- Publication place: United States
- Media type: Print (Paperback)
- ISBN: 0886770343
- Preceded by: Armada of Antares
- Followed by: Renegade of Kregen

The Tides of Kregen is a science fiction novel written by Kenneth Bulmer under the pseudonym of Alan Burt Akers. It is the twelfth volume in his extensive Dray Prescot series of sword and planet novels, set on the fictional world of Kregen, a planet of the Antares star system in the constellation of Scorpio. It was first published by DAW Books in 1976.

The Dray Prescot series is made of several cycles of novels, each cycle essentially forming a series within the series. In addition to being the twelfth volume in the series as a whole, The Tides of Kregen is also the first of three volumes in the Krozair Cycle. It is set on the fictional continent of Turismond as well as the island of Valka and Earth.

The 52 completed novels of the Dray Prescot series were written by Bulmer between 1972 and 1997, when a stroke stopped his writing, also the later Dray Prescot books, after 1988, were originally only published in German. The series is in the spirit of Edgar Rice Burroughs John Carter of Mars series.

== Plot summary ==
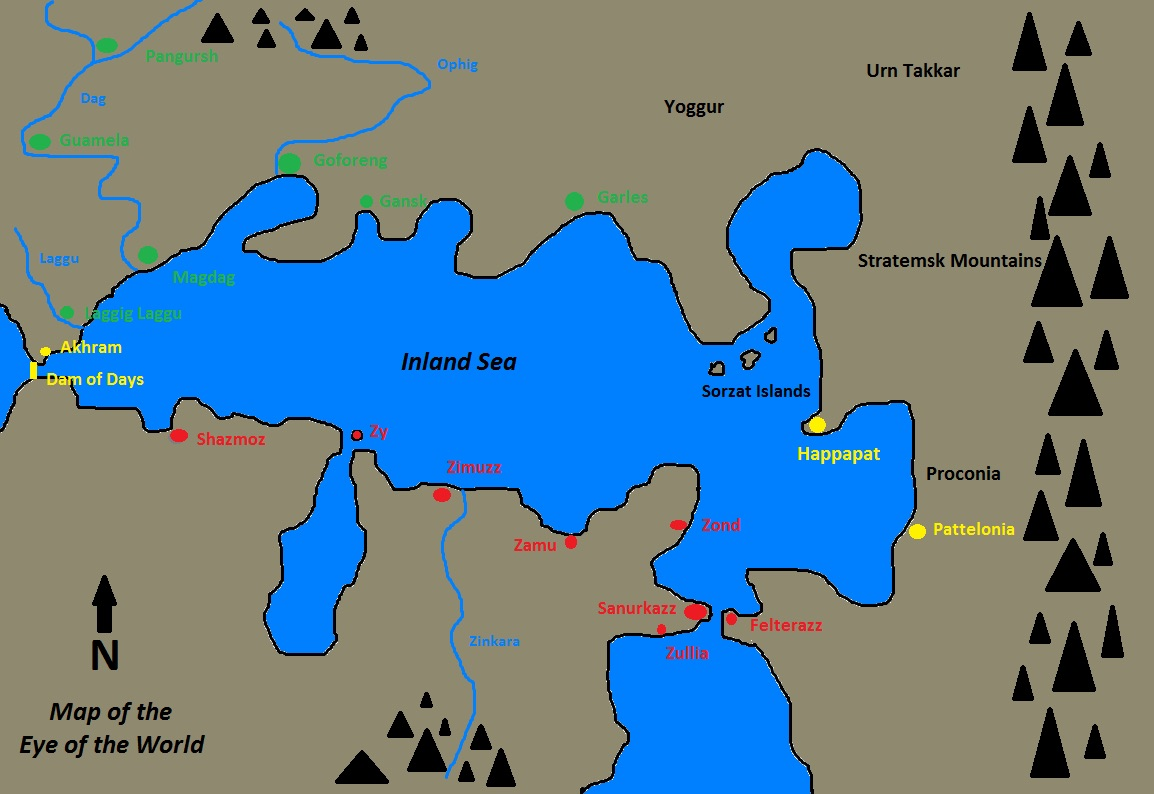
Map of the Eye of the World

The book takes place a number of years after the events of Armada of Antares and the short story Wizard of Scorpio. It begins with an argument between Khe-Hi-Bjanching, a young Wizard of Loh and Evold Scavander about a visitation by Phu-si-Yantong. Prescot is than visited by the Gdoinye, the messenger bird of the Star Lords, to tell him his service will be required soon. He is astonished to hear that his son Drak was able to see the bird, too, when he thought it invisible to all himself. He shortly after informs Delia that he might be leaving soon.

When a messenger informs Prescot that the Shanks, a mysterious race of raiders have attacked an island of Valka and he rushes out with a small force to beat them back. The small force, including Delia and Drak, are trapped in an island village and under attack when Prescot is teleported away by the Star Lords. He resists and refuses to take up battle in his new location, instead returning to Delia. The Gdoinye warns him of his foolishness to resist and once more he is teleported, arriving for the first time fully armed and clothed. Again he defies the Star Lords and for this he is banished to Earth, seemingly for good.

Prescot spends the next decades on Earth, getting involved in wars out of boredom and growing every more morose and desperate to return to Kregen. He studies science and is eventually introduced to a Madam Ivanovna who reveals herself to be connected to Kregen but to be neither a Savanti nor a Star Lord. She tells Prescot her real name, Zena Iztar and he learns that 18 years have passed on Kregen since his departure. He learns that Drak and Delia survived the attack and that his older twins are now 32 years old and the second set 21, the age Delia was when she met Prescot. He also learns that the Savanti are only interested in the humans of Kregen while the Star Lords goals are broader and that their interests have clashed. She also tells him that she had influenced his directions at the Eye of the World when the Star Lords and the Savanti pulled him in opposite directions. Three more years pass before Prescot is finally returned to Kregen in 1871.

Prescot finds himself fighting slavers on a remote island. After fulfilling this task he sets of in a small boat, not knowing where he is. He is eventually rescued by a merchant ship and taken to Xuntal from where he heads home to Valka. He finds all his family dispersed and Delia to have left for the Eye of the World almost a year ago and follows her. Once more Prescot crosses the hostile lands and the Stratemsk mountains of eastern Turismond to reach the inner sea, after a 50-year absence. He heads for Felteraz and Mayfwy, widow of his friend Zorg to gain information. He learns that Delia had indeed been there and that the eternal war between the two sides is going badly for the Zairians, with the South holding up at sea but consistently losing the land battles to the Grodnims.

Prescot returns to the fortress of the Krozairs of Zy but instead of a welcome he is declared Apushniad, an outcast, for not heading the call to arms to all Krozairs when it was issued. Prescot is deeply affected by this sentence as being a Krozair was of the titles he held the one he valued most. He is sentenced to become an oar slave once more but is allowed an hour with Delia just before being send to the ship, their first encounter in 21 years. Prescot passes the time from then on in a form of trance, unable to comprehend what was happening until he is freed by his to former oar comrades Nath and Zolta. They inform him that Delia has returned to Valka, being pregnant, and that she expects Dray to regain his status as Krozair, which the latter accepts as his duty.

Prescot secretly leaves his friends to head west and meet Pur Zenkiren who leads an army there. He survives a raid by the Grodnim on an army supply camp and gains a new friend in Duhrra the wrestler when he saves the latter, acquiring the alias of Dak in the process. He heads for the city of Shazmoz, under siege by the Grodnim. In Shazmoz he meets Zenkiren and at first the too declares Prescot an Apushniad but the latter forces him to listen to some of his story. Zenkiren eventually sides with Prescot and explains the current situation in the Eye of the World. Genod Gannius, new leader of the Grodnim, a man Prescot suspects to be related to Gahan Gannius and Valima whom he saved so long ago in The Suns of Scorpio has employed tactics against the Zairians Prescot himself so long ago used against the Overlords of Magdag in an unsuccessful slave revolt.

Departing from Zenkiren Prescot and Duhrra ride west, to the Grand Canal and the Dam of Days, where the Eye of the World ends, a territory now held by the Grodnim, with Prescot resolved to leave this part of Kregen for good and to concentrate on his life back in Vallia. He returns to the Akhram of the Todalpheme, the monks calculating the tides of Kregen and learns that a convoy loaded with flying boats for the Grodnim is scheduled to pass the Dam of Days just before a storm will hit and the dam will be closed. Unwilling to let the Grodnim have the advantage of flying boats, usually unseen at the Eye of the World, Prescot resolves to destroy this convoy but not after arguing with himself as to whether he should get involved or not.

Prescot finally reaches the Dam of Days, build by the ancient Sunset People who the Savanti were the last remnants of. He forces the dam open to let the flood through and destroy the ships from Menaham carrying the flying boats as well as all ships as far as Shazmoz. The Star Lords attempt to teleport him away but he successfully fights them, feeling that he is also helped by another force. With the task completed the two companions head for Magdag, encountering Zena Iztar on their way who confirms to Prescot that it was she who assisted him against the Star Lords. She informs him that he will not be allowed to leave the Eye of the World as yet but he continues on to Magdag nevertheless.

== Publishing ==
The book was first published in English in August 1976. It was first published in German in 1980 as Die Gezeiten von Kregen. In 2006 the book was published as an E-book by Mushroom Books.

== Book covers ==
The cover of the original US edition was illustrated by Michael Whelan, the first German edition by Ron Kirby. The second German edition was illustrated by Ken Kelly.
