= A Fortune for Kregen =

1979 novel by Kenneth Bulmer

- First edition cover
- Author: Kenneth Bulmer
- Cover artist: Richard Hescox
- Language: English
- Series: Dray Prescot series
- Genre: Sword and planet
- Published: 1979
- Publisher: DAW Books
- Publication place: United States
- Media type: Print (Paperback)
- Pages: 222
- ISBN: 0-87997-505-9
- Preceded by: A Sword for Kregen
- Followed by: A Victory for Kregen

A Fortune for Kregen is a novel by Kenneth Bulmer published in 1979.

== Plot summary ==
A Fortune for Kregen is a novel in which Dray Prescot is recovering from a wound suffered during a game of jikaida.

== Publication history ==
After Bulmer bruised his arm badly in a fall, A Fortune for Kregen was published in December 1979, after which came A Victory for Kregen.

== Reception ==
John T. Sapienza, Jr. reviewed A Fortune for Kregen for Different Worlds magazine and stated that "our hero escapes slavery and emerges from the moder to face his real enemy at the end of the book. The author seems to have had great fun, since the last chapter contains a suggestion that Prescot will return to Moderdrin again."
