= Prince of Scorpio =

1974 novel by Kenneth Bulmer

- Cover of first edition
- Author: Kenneth Bulmer
- Cover artist: Jack Gaughan
- Language: English
- Series: Dray Prescot series
- Genre: Sword and planet
- Publisher: DAW Books
- Publication date: 1974
- Publication place: United States
- Media type: Print (Paperback)
- ISBN: 0879971045
- Preceded by: Swordships of Scorpio
- Followed by: Manhounds of Antares

Prince of Scorpio is a science fiction novel by British author Kenneth Bulmer, written under the pseudonym of Alan Burt Akers. It is the fifth book in his extensive Dray Prescot series of sword and planet novels, set on the fictional world of Kregen, a planet of the Antares star system in the constellation of Scorpio. It was first published by DAW Books in 1974.

The Dray Prescot series is made of several cycles of novels, each cycle essentially forming a series within the series. In addition to being the fifth volume in the series as a whole, Prince of Scorpio is also the fifth and final volume in the Delian Cycle. It is set on the fictional island of Vallia.

The 52 completed novels of the Dray Prescot series were written by Bulmer between 1972 and 1997, when a stroke stopped his writing, also the later Dray Prescot books, after 1988, were originally only published in German. The series is in the spirit of Edgar Rice Burroughs John Carter of Mars series.

== Plot summary ==
Unlike the previous books, Prince of Scorpio does not follow on directly from the previous novel, Swordships of Scorpio. Instead, Dray Prescot finds himself on an unknown beach on Kregen, after having spent some time on Earth without mentioning how long and where.

Prescot has once more been returned to Kregen by either the Savanti or the Star Lords, this time to save a group of prisoners from a stranded ship who are being killed by their guards. Prescot receives help from another agent of the Savanti, Alex Hunter, the first time he encounters another Earthman on Kregen. Hunter is mortally wounded and dies in Prescot's arms. Prescot, after saving some of the prisoners and killing all the guards, finds out that the prisoners are from Vallia and of the people-based Panval party, arrested for their opposition to the aristocrat-based Ractor party. Prescot, who the prisoners believe to be called Drak, the first time this name is used for him, finds out that he is on the island of Valka, off the coast of Vallia.

Prescot sets off to find help for the stranded former prisoners. He finds the island devastated through slaving raids and roaming mercenaries. The young population has either been enslaved or escaped into the central mountain range. Prescot is made welcome in a simple village full of old people but falls ill from drinking the poisonous canal water of Vallia. While slowly recovering, he has a first-hand experience of the mercenaries taking food from the village, with Prescot unable to interfere because of his illness. Once recovered however, when the mercenaries return he fights and kills them.

Dray Prescot then attempts to take a boat across to Vallia but is forced back by a sudden storm, similar to events on the Eye of the World when the Star Lords prevented him from travelling back to Magdag or Sanurkazz. The Gdoinye appears and, for the first time, speaks to Prescot, calling him a fool. The bird tells him that the Star Lords were not the ones to bring him to Valka but that he now had a task to complete. He replies that he wishes to return to Delia but the Gdoinye tells him she is not missing him and reminds him of the years he spend with the clansmen when only a day passed for Delia. He begins to understand that he is in a time loop and accepts his role in the liberation of Valka.

Prescot spends the next six years fighting the oppressors of the people of Valka, eventually succeeding. In the fortress of Esser Rarioch in the capital of Valka, Valkanium, he is offered and accepts the title of strom, equivalent of a count, of Valka. He prepares to leave for Vallia by ship, planning to first head to Zenicce. However, with his task completed, he is taken away from Kregen once more and transported to Paris during the 1830 revolution July Revolution.

After an undisclosed time period, Prescot is returned to Kregen, now to the mountainous northern part of Vallia to rescue two aristocrats whose flying boat has crashed in the mountains. The two are Naghan Furtway, Kov of Falinur, and his nephew, Jenbar, to which Prescot takes a liking while he finds the kov to be arrogant. He travels south by canal boat and eventually reaches the capital of Vallia, Vondium, to find that Delia and the Emperor have both gone west to the Blue Mountains. On his journey there, Prescot joins a caravan which incidentally carries the dowry for Delia's wedding to a local lord, arranged by her father. The caravan is ambushed by bandits loyal to Delia and robbed of the treasure, a plan devised by Delia to stop her wedding. Prescot is recognised by the leader of the bandits, Korf Aighos, having been told by Delia to look out for his arrival.

Prescot and some of the bandits, including Aighos, are captured by the emperors men and brutally dragged back to the capital. There, before the emperor, Prescot is sentenced to death. Delia recognises him and tries to prevent him from being taken away but fails. On the way to the executioner, Prescot is rescued by Seg, whom he believed to be dead and who is now a member of the Imperial Guard of bowmen of Loh. Seg takes Dray Prescot out of the palace and explains to him that he and Thelda are now married and have a son called Dray. Dray Prescot makes a full recovery and returns to the imperial palace, now as the Strom of Valka, positively impressing the emperor. Delia initially disbelieves him that he is the strom as she is unaware of the time loop that allowed Prescot to liberate Valka while being somewhere else on Kregen at the same time.

Prescot is approached by a representative of the Ractor party who wishes to gain his support for their candidate to wed Delia, Vomanus. Prescot is taken by surprise by this turn and wonders why Vomanus would be interested in Delia after knowing how much Prescot loved her. Prescot starts to plan to run away with Delia, either to Zenicce or the Eye of the World. Instead however, Prescot is summoned to follow the emperor and Delia to Vindelka. On the way he is delayed by storms and upon arrival finds out that the Emperor's party had been attacked. He accidentally runs into Inch, who has been captured and enslaved by a Vallians ship, and Prescot frees him. Warned by Vomanus, the emperor and Delia have escaped to a place called the Dragon's Bones, and Prescot follows them while sending Inch to the Blue Mountains to organise help.

Upon arriving at the Dragon's Bones, Prescot initially lands in the camp of the rebels, who believe him to have come in their support. When the leader of the uprising, Kov Naghan Furtway, arrives, Prescot's true identity is discovered and he escapes to the emperor's party. There he learns that Delia is not present. The emperor and his guard of bowmen are hard pressed and eventually, when the situation becomes desperate, Prescot decides to try to break out to save the emperor's life. The breakout fails, and just when the small group is making their last stand, Delia arrives with airboats from Zenicce, where she went to organise help from. The combined force of Clansmen, the allied houses of Zenicce, and men from the Blue Mountains, defeat the uprising. The leaders however escape.

The emperor learns of Prescot's true identity, but, having during the battle promised Delia's hand to him if he can save him, is forced to let the two wed and makes Prescot the Prince Majister of Vallia, the equivalent of crown prince. Prescot also learns that the Vomanus is Delia's half brother, a son of her mother from a previous marriage, but is told that this is to be kept secret.

The appendix section of the book contains a hand-drawn map of Kregen for the first time, attributed to Dray Prescot as well as a glossary.

== Publishing ==
The book was first published in English in April 1974. It was first published in German in 1976 as Der Prinz von Scorpio. In 2005 the book was published as an E-book by Mushroom Books.

== Book covers ==
The cover of the original US edition was illustrated by Jack Gaughan and the second one by Josh Kirby. The second German edition was illustrated by Boris Vallejo.
