= Arena of Antares =

1974 novel by Kenneth Bulmer

- First edition cover
- Author: Kenneth Bulmer
- Cover artist: Jack Gaughan
- Language: English
- Series: Dray Prescot series
- Genre: Sword and planet
- Published: 1974
- Publisher: DAW Books
- Publication place: United States
- Media type: Print (Paperback)
- ISBN: 0879971452
- Preceded by: Manhounds of Antares
- Followed by: Fliers of Antares

Arena of Antares is a science fiction novel by British writer Kenneth Bulmer, written under the pseudonym of Alan Burt Akers; it is the seventh volume in his Dray Prescot series of sword and planet novels, set on the fictional world of Kregen, a planet of the Antares star system in the constellation of Scorpio. It was first published by DAW Books in 1974.

The Dray Prescot series is made of several cycles of novels, each cycle essentially forming a series within the series. In addition to being the seventh volume in the series as a whole, Arena of Antares is also the second of six volumes in the Havilfar Cycle. It is set on the fictional continent of Havilfar.

The 52 completed novels of the Dray Prescot series were written by Bulmer between 1972 and 1997, when a stroke stopped his writing, also the later Dray Prescot books, after 1988, were originally only published in German. The series is in the spirit of Edgar Rice Burroughs John Carter of Mars series.

== Plot summary ==
The book follows on directly from the events of Manhounds of Antares. Prescot returns to Yamman, commanded to do so by the Star Lords, narrowly escaping a number of Canop galleys on the river. The companions are saved by an attack of Volrok, a race of flying men, on the galleys. With the help of Turko, Prescot frees the twin-brother of Mog and starts to train the Miglas as soldiers. Overconfident, the Miglas attack against Prescots wishes and force a battle the Canops ultimately win.

Upon returning to the rebel Migla camp he instructs them to continue training and, with Turko by his side, takes their flying boat to Valka and raises an army to come to the support of the Miglas. Delia secretly accompanies him and the combined army defeats the Canops in battle. Just at this moment, when Prescot attempts to tell Delia of his background, a scorpion of the Star Lords appears, tells him that they are satisfied with his work and that he will now be taken to Hyrklana.

Prescot fights the teleportation but loses and finds himself having to rescue a group of people who he later learns were plotting the overthrow of Fahia, the evil Queen of Hyrklana and twin-sister of Lilah who he had encountered at Faol. He is captured after his successful rescue, opts to fight in the arena and works his way up in the rank of the gladiators. The arena is subdivided into four fighting houses, of which Prescot is allocated to the Red Drang.

Prescot plots his escape but, as on previous occasions, the Star Lords interfere, raising a powerful storm to prevent his departure from the capital of Hyrklana. The flying boat crashes alongside another, carrying cages of wild animals. Prescot is forced to rescue a young slave girl by killing a powerful predator. He is captured after this and chained.

Flung before Queen Fahia he is told that the animal he killed was destined for her, with her keeping a number of them as pets. She intends to send Prescot to a slow death but a young noble recognises him as the man that saved them when they were conspiring against the Queen. He instead suggests that Prescot fights in the arena, to give him a chance, and the Queen dictates that he is to fight a Leem. To further tip the odds against his favour he is to fight with an outlandish sword of a large size. To his surprise the weapon is a Krozair long sword. Prescot sees the influence of the Star Lords or the Savanti in this fortunate turn of events.

Prescot, with great show, defeats the Leem and challenges the Queen who pardons him, her curiosity aroused. He surrenders his sword, conscious that he was prevented from escaping Hyrklana for a reason and manages to pacify the Queen. He meets the conspirators on his departure and establishes contact with the dissidents wanting to overthrow the Queen. Prescot eventually returns to the arena where he is welcomed back by the Red Drang. Prescot spends his time in the arena while conspiring the overthrow of the Queen as well as becoming more acquainted with her. The conspirators wish him to kill the Queen in one of his private meetings with her but he refuses to commit the crime of a cold blooded murder of a woman.

While with the Queen Prescot one night encounters Delia as a slave. He embraces her and they both attempt to escape the guards. He learns that, for Delia, their last separation was only four days ago, another instance of Prescot being in a time loop, and that she followed him to Hyrclana after hearing him say he did not want to go there during his forced departure. Delia's flying boat crashed on the way, she was taken captive and sold as a slave to the Queen. Dray and Delia fight their way through the palace, eventually escaping on a flying bird. In the city itself they steal a flying boat but once more a sudden, artificial storm throws them back. The flying boat crashes and Prescot is knocked unconscious, with both of them been taken captive.

Dray Prescot is taken to the Queen and, from there, to the arena where Delia is bound to a stake. He is given a short sword and then finds himself facing a Boloth, a sixteen-legged creature of huge size. Prescots friends of the Red Drang assist him in the fight by taking the Krozair long sword to him which he uses to defeat the Boloth. Delia and Prescot are then rescued by a very large flying boat manned by his friends and members of the army that went to assist the Miglas and escape, along with four of his friends from the arena. This time he is not prevented by the Star Lords from leaving Hyrclana, indicating that he fulfilled his mission.

== Publishing ==
The book was first published in English in December 1974. It was first published in German in 1977 as In der Arena von Antares. In 2006 the book was published as an E-book by Mushroom Books.

== Book covers ==
The cover of the original US edition was illustrated by Jack Gaughan. The second German edition was illustrated by Boris Vallejo.
