= Renegade of Kregen =

1976 novel by Kenneth Bulmer

- First edition cover
- Author: Kenneth Bulmer
- Cover artist: Michael Whelan
- Language: English
- Series: Dray Prescot series
- Genre: Sword and planet
- Published: 1976
- Publisher: DAW Books
- Publication place: United States
- Media type: Print (Paperback)
- ISBN: 0886770351
- Preceded by: The Tides of Kregen
- Followed by: Krozair of Kregen

Renegade of Kregen is a science fiction novel by British writer Kenneth Bulmer, written under the pseudonym of Alan Burt Akers; it is the thirteenth volume in his Dray Prescot series of sword and planet novels, set on the fictional world of Kregen, a planet of the Antares star system in the constellation of Scorpio. It was first published by DAW Books in 1976.

The Dray Prescot series is made of several cycles of novels, each cycle essentially forming a series within the series. In addition to being the thirteenth volume in the series as a whole, Renegade of Kregen is also the second of three volumes in the Krozair Cycle. It is set in the fictional Eye of the World on the continent of Turismond .

The 52 completed novels of the Dray Prescot series were written by Bulmer between 1972 and 1997, when a stroke stopped his writing, also the later Dray Prescot books, after 1988, were originally only published in German. The series is in the spirit of Edgar Rice Burroughs John Carter of Mars series.

== Plot summary ==
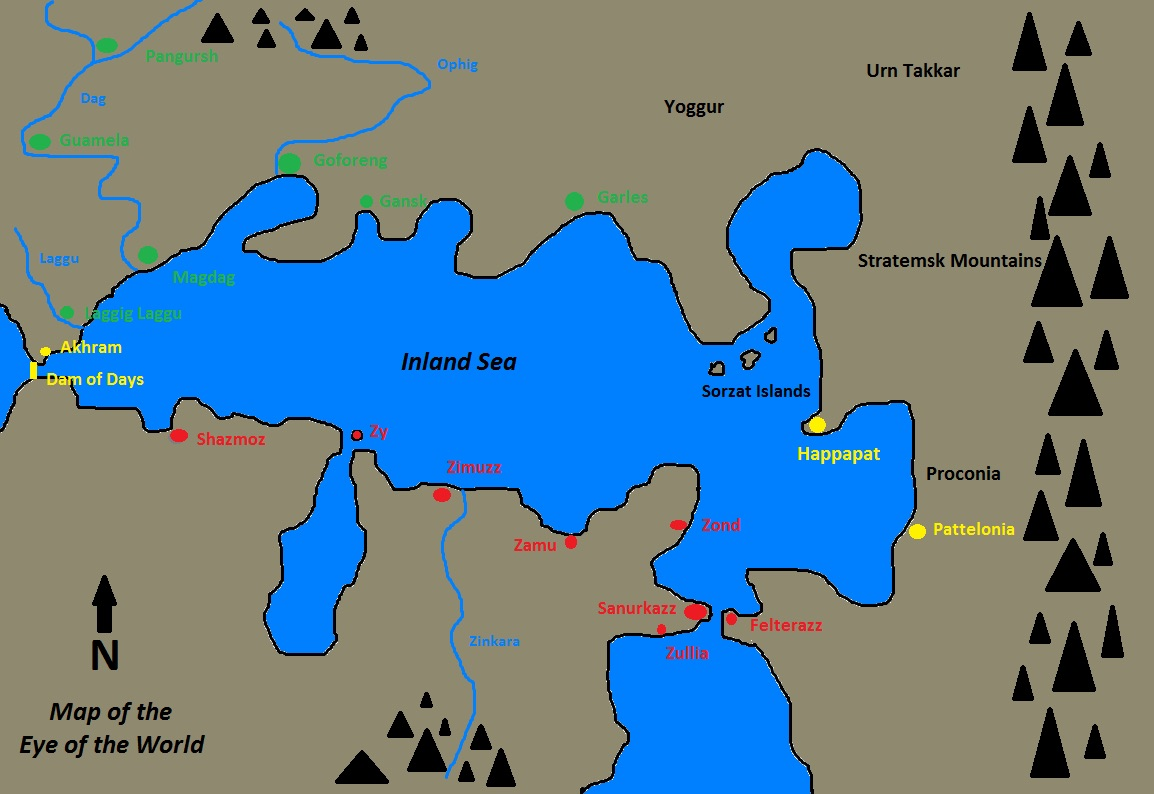
Map of the Eye of the World

The book continues on shortly after the events from The Tides of Kregen with Prescot and Duhrra arriving in Magdag to look for a ship to take them to Vallia and the two take passage on an argenter from Menaham. Attacked by pirates and rescued by a galley from Magdag, Prescot and the captain are taken before the ship's master, Gafard, a renegade from the south. He persuades Prescot, still traveling under the name of Dak, to join him.

Prescot joins Gafard, who is an admirer of Pur Dray but unawares that the former has been declared an Apushniad and that he is in his presence. Prescot is accepted in the ranks of the Grodnim as a renegade by King Genod, receiving the new name of Gadak. The latter also encounters Princess Susheeng in the process who does not recognise him. During the ceremony Prescot is visited by Zena Iztar again who questions his motives and once more tells him that, to be allowed to leave the Eye of the World he must become a Krozair of Zy again.

Prescot and Duhrra than ride north with Gafard and an army to fight a barbarian invasion. On the way Prescot saves Gafard's life and the life of his Lady when attacked by a predator. By saving the girl, revered to as the Lady of the Stars by Gafard, he sees her face, normally hidden, and for the first time in his life feels he has met a woman equal to Delia in beauty. Gafard keeps her a secret to protect her from King Genod's in saturable desire for women and Prescot is instructed never to mention the girls beauty.

After a successful campaign Gafard is called back urgently to Magdag with Prescot accompanying him. Prescot is now once more resolved to regain his status as Krozair. In Magdag they learn that Shazmoz has been relieved and that the Zairians are on the advance while the tidal wave created by Prescot has swept away the Grodnim supplies. Gafard, ordered south with a new army, makes Prescot the standard bearer for the Lady of the Stars who is to accompany them on their trip.

The Grodnim army lands behind the Zairian lines, east of Shazmoz and, when King Genod arrives with two air boats Prescot forms the plan to capture those and Genod as well as Gafard. He succeeds in taking the larger air boat but then unexpectedly encounters his old Hamalian friends Rees and Chido and realises that the two would recognise him, forcing him to hide. With the opportunity gone the army marches into battle the next day and Prescot decides to make a stand then and there but is prevented when news comes that the Lady of the Stars has been abducted.

Prescot, along with a handful of men loyal to Gafard head out to rescue her and succeed just in time. After the successful rescue and battle Gafard and his followers, with Prescot, return to Magdag. Attempts to abduct Gafard's Lady continue unsuccessful for the time. On a hunting trip the King's men finally succeed in taking the Lady of the Stars and Gafard's men, except Grogor, his second in command, refuse to go against the King. Prescot refuses, too until he finds out that the Lady of the Stars is in reality his daughter Velia which he had last seen when she was three years old.

Prescot and Grogor ride out to rescue Velia, arriving just in time to see the King escape with her on a saddle bird. Grogor wounds the bird with an arrow and the King drops Velia to escape. Prescot reveals to Velia that he is her father and she explains to him how she was captured by Gafard, that she loves him and that they have a daughter together. Velia dies in Prescot's arms and the latter is captured by the King's men.

== Publishing ==
The book was first published in English in December 1976. It was first published in German in 1979 as Die Abtrünnigen von Kregen. In 2007 the book was published as an E-book by Mushroom Books.

== Book covers ==
The cover of the original US and German edition was illustrated by Michael Whelan, the second German edition by Chris Achilleos.
