= To Outrun Doomsday =

1967 novel by Kenneth Bulmer

- Cover of the first edition
- Author: Kenneth Bulmer
- Cover artist: Kelly Freas
- Language: English
- Genre: Science fiction
- Publisher: Ace Books
- Publication date: 1967
- Publication place: United States
- Media type: Print (Paperback)
- Pages: 159

To Outrun Doomsday is a science fiction novel by English writer Kenneth Bulmer. It was first published in 1967.

== Plot summary ==
The novel concerns "Lucky" Jack Waley, a computer salesman and conman unfortunate enough to be aboard the starship Bucentaure when the engine blows. He crashlands on the planet Kerim, a planet where anything people ask for from the mysterious Pe'Ichen is instantly manufactured before their eyes--anything trivial. No food, no houses; and for the current generation, no children.

Jack connects up with a variety of rogues to try to save the day, only to discover that Pe'Ichen is an ancient computer with miraculous powers, designed to keep order in the lives of the Kerimites, providing them with their every need. Pe'Ichen, however, has determined that:

A) the sun will explode in 56 years, and

B) that there is no such thing as life on other planets.
