= Dray Prescot series =

Science fiction novels by Kenneth Bulmer

- First published in 1972, Transit to Scorpio is shown here with the original artwork by Tim Kirk.
- 52 volumes
- Author: Kenneth Bulmer
- Country: United States
- Language: English
- Genre: sword and planet, science fantasy
- Publisher: DAW Books
- Published: 1972 – 1997
- Media type: Print (paperback)
- No. of books: 52

The Dray Prescot series is a sequence of fifty-two science fiction novels and a number of associated short stories of the subgenre generally classified as sword and planet, written by British author Kenneth Bulmer under the pseudonym of Alan Burt Akers.

The sequence is made up of eleven cycles of novels, each cycle essentially forming a series within the series. Four novels and three short stories are stand-alone narratives falling outside the system of cycles. Each tale is narrated in the first person by the protagonist, Dray Prescot. To support the illusion that the fictional Prescot was the actual author, later volumes were bylined "by Dray Prescot as told to Alan Burt Akers."

== Publication ==
The first thirty-seven volumes were published by DAW Books from December 1972 to April 1988; to date, print editions of the later volumes have been published solely in German translation by Wilhelm Heyne Verlag from 1991 to 1998.

English language ebooks of volumes 38–41 were later issued by the now-defunct electronic publisher Savanti from September 1995 – December 1998; ebooks of volumes 1–52 have since been issued by another electronic publisher, Mushroom eBooks. Publication was held up for close to six years between volumes 45 and 46 due to family illness and difficulty in locating the manuscripts. As of 5 February 2014 it was reported that all the missing manuscripts had been found except that for Demons of Antares (Book 46), which was being translated back into English from the German version, a process then "almost finished." Publication of the volume followed in June 2014, with the remaining volumes appearing at intervals through the remainder of the year. Volume 52 was published in November 2014.

On April 3, 2007, Bladud Books, a division of Mushroom Publishing, began re-releasing the series in print, in both paperback and hardcover, with the intention of publishing omnibus volumes of each cycle of books in the series. The series of omnibuses was completed with the publication of The Spectre Cycle on September 11, 2015. All these volumes have also been made available in electronic form, and are listed on Amazon.com.

== Setting ==
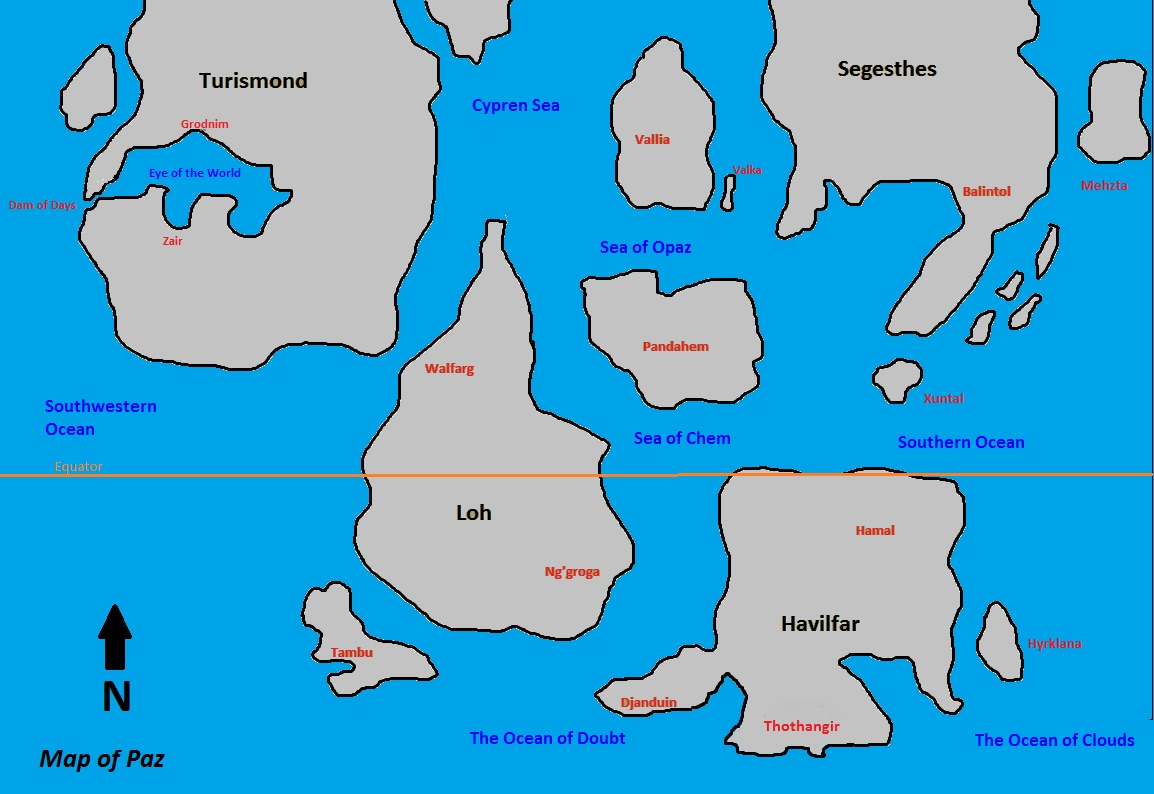
Map of Paz, the continent group in which the Dray Prescot series is set.

The series is set on the fictional world of Kregen, a planet of the Antares star system in the constellation of Scorpio. Antares is envisioned as a double star system consisting of a large red giant (Antares A) and a smaller green star (Antares B). Antares B is in reality blue, though often described as green, probably owing to a contrast effect. Presumably some similar effect, or perhaps some quality of Kregen’s atmosphere, makes it appear green from the planet’s surface. Kregen has a multiple moon system.

Bulmer's choice of the setting for the series is a subtle tribute to the Martian series of Edgar Rice Burroughs, the prototypical planetary romance. The star Antares, similar in brightness and hue to the planet Mars in the night sky, was given its name (ant(i)-Ares, meaning "opposite Mars" or "equal to Mars") by early astronomers to compare it to and help distinguish it from the planet. The premise is furthered in that while on Earth, Prescot meets an unnamed "gentleman from Virginia" who is implied to be John Carter, the protagonist of Burroughs' Martian series.

Physically, Kregen is similar to Earth, being comfortably habitable by human beings. It has seven major continents and nine continental islands similar in size to Australia, in addition to innumerable smaller islands. The scene of all the action is Paz, a grouping of four major continents and four continental islands in one hemisphere. The remaining land masses, in the opposite hemisphere, are little known.

Most of the land masses forming Paz are separated by narrow seas, indicating that in geologically recent times it was a supercontinent, since broken apart by tectonic forces. The continents of Paz are fairly compact in comparison to those of Earth, without connecting land bridges. They include Turismond to the northwest, Segesthes to the northeast, Loh in the center, and Havilfar to the southeast. Turismond and Havilfar both contain large inland seas similar to the Mediterranean. The continental islands of Paz include Vallia between Turismond and Segesthes, Pandahem between Loh, Segesthes and Havilfar, Unrdrin to the northeast of Turismond, and Mehzia to the east of Segesthes. Of the continents and continental islands of the opposite hemisphere, the only one named in the series is the continent of Gah, mentioned in Transit to Scorpio as a place of distasteful sexual customs (an obvious dig at another sword and planet series, the Gor series of John Norman).

At some time in the past Kregen was apparently seeded with intelligent life-forms from many other worlds by either the Star Lords or the Savanti (for whom see below), or both, presumably by the same mysterious means by which Prescot is brought to the planet. In Paz the dominant species is usually the human race, known locally as Apim. Other intelligent species are known collectively as Diffs. Culturally, the more advanced nations are at a level on par with Earth’s European Renaissance, though firearms are unknown and a few nations manufacture aircraft. The opposite hemisphere is apparently dominated by Shanks, savage fish-headed sea-raiders who periodically ravage the peripheral coastlands of Paz.

Notable polities of Paz include the decadent kingdom of Walfarg in northern Loh, remnant of a formerly vast empire, the island empire of Vallia, the smaller kingdoms of northern Pandahem and southern Segesthes’ Balintol subcontinent, the imperialistic empire of Hamal in the northeast Havilfar and the petty states of the Dawn Lands to its south, the more isolated kingdom of Djanduin in southwestern Havilfar, and the perpetually warring Zairim and Grodnim to the north and south of the Eye of the World, the Mediterranean-like sea bisecting Turismond. More primitive areas marginalized from the civilized belt by geography or topography include the Great Plains of Segesthes, the Hostile Territories of Eastern Turismond, the Wild Lands of north central Havilfar, and the jungles of South Pandahem and central Loh.

== Storyline ==
The series features the story of Earthman Dray Prescot, an English sailor of Nelson's navy, and his miraculous teleportation to the planet Kregen. There he is trained as an agent for the mysterious Savanti, an apparently benevolent secret society devoted to improving the lot of humanity among the many intelligent species of Kregen. The Savanti are the guardians of a miraculous pool which both heals wounds and extends life, similar to the Fountain of Youth in Earth legend. Prescot falls from grace for using this pool to heal Delia, an injured supplicant to the Savanti, and incidentally the princess of the island empire of Vallia. Thanks to their immersion in the pool Prescot and Delia gain extended natural lifespans of a thousand years, but by violating the sanctity of the pool both are banished back to their homelands—in Prescot’s case, Earth.

Returned to Kregen through the agency of the Star Lords, an even more mysterious rival group of unknown motivations, Prescot becomes a pawn in their schemes, sent willy-nilly to various locations on the planet to serve their ends and capriciously returned to Earth when his task is done or when he manages to offend them. Despite this handicap he usually rises to a position of power in whatever society he is thrust into, and is able to renew and further his relationship with Delia. Eventually they are able to wed and found a family.

Aside from carrying out his missions for the Star Lords, securing his place on Kregen, and winning (and returning to) Delia, Prescot’s ongoing goals include the suppression of slavery in Paz and building a coalition against the marauding Shanks, a Viking-like race of fish-headed Diffs who raid the coasts of Paz from a base in the opposite hemisphere of Kregen.

The text is ostensibly a transcript by “Akers” of a series of audio tapes recorded by Dray Prescot on periodic returns to Earth, which come into his hands by a variety of means over a number of years. Supposed gaps in the tapes allow the author the opportunity of occasional jumps in the narrative, leaving teasing mysteries for the reader as to just what might have happened in between.

The cycles into which the sequence is divided form substories within the overall storyline, sometimes arranged topically and sometimes by setting. These sequences include:

- The Delian Cycle, which relates Prescot’s earliest sojourns on Kregen, introduces a number of the main Kregish settings, and resolves his initial quest for the hand of Delia.
- The Havilfar Cycle, set on the continent of Havilfar, unseen in the earlier cycle, which deals mainly with Prescot’s quest to learn the secret of manufacturing vollers, or airships, a monopoly of Havilfar’s expansionist empire of Hamal.
- The Krozair Cycle, which returns Prescot to the Eye of the World, a Mediterranean-like locale first visited in the Delian Cycle, where he is now outlawed for having failed to aid his fellow members in the warrior brotherhood of the Krozairs of Zy (he was on Earth at the time).
- The Vallian Cycle, which plunges the empire of Vallia into civil war, which only the exertions of Prescot can resolve.
- The Jikaida Cycle, which finds him as a sort of gladiator condemned to fight in living games of Jikaida, ordinarily a chess-like board game played by the peoples of Kregen. The game of Jikaida was inspired by Jetan, or Martian Chess, invented by Edgar Rice Burroughs for his Martian novels.
- The Spikatur cycle.
- The Pandahem Cycle, dealing mainly with the affairs of the island continent of Pandahem.
- The Witch War Cycle, concerning Prescot's efforts to combat a magical curse placed on Vallia.
- The Lohvian Cycle, set primarily on the continent of Loh.
- The Balintol Cycle, set primarily on the subcontinent of Balintol.
- The Spectre Cycle, set primarily in Vallia, this is the final group of Dray Prescot novels.

The story never catches up to the present, although from Prescot’s mysterious appearances and disappearances in the present day it can be presumed that his role as a pawn of the Star Lords continues. Prescot learns more of the rival Star Lords and Savanti as the series progresses, though their mysteries are never fully resolved.

It was Bulmer’s expressed intent to resolve the sequence in volume 53 by having Prescot and Delia experience a sort of apotheosis, possibly raising them to the level of Star Lords themselves, to be revealed in a final visit to Earth by their son Drak, thus accounting for the unfinished nature of the narrative. This volume was never completed by Bulmer, and remains an unpublished fragment.

== Bibliography ==
Note: as later volumes were originally published only in German, for the sake of completeness both English and German titles are provided.

=== Delian cycle ===
The Delian cycle (Der Delia-Zyklus):

- 1. Transit to Scorpio (Dec. 1972; Transit nach Scorpio)
- 2. The Suns of Scorpio (Apr. 1973; Die Sonnen von Scorpio)
- 3. Warrior of Scorpio (Aug. 1973; Der Schwertkämpfer von Scorpio)
- 4. Swordships of Scorpio (Dec. 1973; Die Armada von Scorpio)
- 5. Prince of Scorpio (Apr. 1974; Der Prinz von Scorpio)
- The Saga of Dray Prescot: The Delian Cycle (Apr. 2007; omnibus including vols. 1-5)

=== Havilfar cycle ===
The Havilfar cycle (Der Havilfar-Zyklus):

- 6. Manhounds of Antares (Aug. 1974; Die Menschenjäger von Antares)
- 7. Arena of Antares (Dec. 1974; In der Arena von Antares)
- 8. Fliers of Antares (Apr. 1975; Die Flieger von Antares)
- The Saga of Dray Prescot: The Havilfar Cycle I (Apr. 2007; omnibus including vols. 6-8)
- 9. Bladesman of Antares (Aug. 1975; Die Waffenbrüder von Antares, 1977)
- 10. Avenger of Antares (Dec. 1975; Der Rächer von Antares)
- 11. Armada of Antares (Apr. 1976; Die fliegenden Städte von Antares)
- The Saga of Dray Prescot: The Havilfar Cycle II (Apr. 2007; omnibus including vols. 9-11)
- "Wizard of Scorpio" (Jul. 1976; Der Zauberer von Scorpio, 1982) (stand-alone short story)

=== Krozair cycle ===
The Krozair cycle (Der Krozair-Zyklus):

- 12. The Tides of Kregen (Aug. 1976; Die Gezeiten von Kregen)
- 13. Renegade of Kregen (Dec. 1976; Die Abtrünnigen von Kregen, 1979)
- 14. Krozair of Kregen (Apr. 1977; Krozair von Kregen, 1980)
- The Saga of Dray Prescot: The Krozair Cycle (Apr. 2007; omnibus including vols. 12-14)

=== Vallian cycle ===
The Vallian cycle (Der vallianische Zyklus):

- 15. Secret Scorpio (Dec. 1977; Geheimnisvolles Scorpio, 1980)
- 16. Savage Scorpio (Apr. 1978; Wildes Scorpio)
- 17. Captive Scorpio (Aug. 1978; Dayra von Scorpio, 1982)
- 18. Golden Scorpio (Dec. 1978; Goldenes Scorpio)
- The Saga of Dray Prescot: The Vallian Cycle (Apr. 2009; omnibus including vols. 15-18)

=== Jikaida cycle ===
The Jikaida cycle (Der Jikaida-Zyklus) :

- 19. A Life for Kregen (Apr. 1979; Ein Leben für Kregen, 1986)
- 20. A Sword for Kregen (Aug. 1979; Ein Schwert für Kregen, 1986)
- 21. A Fortune for Kregen (Dec. 1979; Ein Schicksal für Kregen, 1986)
- 22. A Victory for Kregen (Apr. 1980; Ein Sieg für Kregen, 1987)
- The Saga of Dray Prescot: The Jikaida Cycle (Aug. 2009; omnibus including vols. 19-22)

=== Spikatur cycle ===
The Spikatur cycle (Der Spikatur-Zyklus):

- 23. Beasts of Antares (Aug. 1980; Die Bestien von Antares, 1987)
- 24. Rebel of Antares (Dec. 1980; Der Rebell von Antares, 1987)
- 25. Legions of Antares (Aug. 1981; Die Legionen von Antares, 1987)
- 26. Allies of Antares (Dec. 1981; Die Verbündeten von Antares, 1987)
- The Saga of Dray Prescot: The Spikatur Cycle (Mar. 2010; omnibus including vols. 23-26)

=== Pandahem cycle ===
The Pandahem cycle (Der Pandahem-Zyklus):

- 27. Mazes of Scorpio (Jun. 1982; Die Labyrinthe von Scorpio, 1988)
- "Green Shadows " (Aug. 1982) (stand-alone short story)
- "Lallia the Slave Girl " (Sep. 1982) (stand-alone short story)
- 28. Delia of Vallia (Dec. 1982; Delia von Vallia, 1988) (stand-alone novel)
- 29. Fires of Scorpio (Apr. 1983; Die Feuer von Scorpio, 1988)
- The Saga of Dray Prescot: The Pandahem Cycle I (May 2011; omnibus including vols. 27-29)
- 30. Talons of Scorpio (Dec. 1983; Die Klauen von Scorpio, 1989)
- 31. Masks of Scorpio (Apr. 1984; Die Masken von Scorpio, 1989)
- 32. Seg the Bowman (Oct. 1984; Seg der Bogenschütze, 1989) (stand-alone novel)
- The Saga of Dray Prescot: The Pandahem Cycle II (Jun. 2011; omnibus including vols. 30-32)

=== Witch War cycle ===
The Witch War cycle (Der Hexenkrieg-Zyklus) :

- 33. Werewolves of Kregen (Jan. 1985; Die Werwölfe von Kregen, 1989)
- 34. Witches of Kregen (Apr. 1985; Die Hexen von Kregen, 1990)
- 35. Storm over Vallia (Aug. 1985; Sturm über Vallia, 1990) (stand-alone novel)
- 36. Omens of Kregen (Dec. 1985; Die Omen von Kregen, 1991)
- 37. Warlord of Antares (Apr. 1988; Die Kriegsherr von Antares, 1991)
- The Saga of Dray Prescot: The Witch War Cycle (Sep. 2011; omnibus including vols. 33-37)

=== Lohvian cycle ===
The Lohvian cycle (Der Loh-Zyklus - originally published in German only):

- 38. Scorpio Reborn (Wiedergeborenes Scorpio, 1991; English ebook edition Sep. 1995)
- 39. Scorpio Assassin (Meuchelmörder von Scorpio, 1992; English ebook edition Feb. 1996)
- 40. Scorpio Invasion (Invasion von Scorpio, 1992; English ebook edition Aug. 1996)
- The Saga of Dray Prescot: The Lohvian Cycle I (Dec. 2011; omnibus including vols. 38-40)
- 41. Scorpio Ablaze (Scorpio in Flammen, 1992; English ebook edition Dec. 1998)
- 42. Scorpio Drums (Die Trommeln von Scorpio, 1992; English ebook edition Apr. 2008)
- 43. Scorpio Triumph (Der Triumph von Scorpio, 1993; English ebook edition Jun. 2008)
- The Saga of Dray Prescot: The Lohvian Cycle II (Sep. 2012; omnibus including vols. 41-43)

=== Balintol cycle ===
The Balintol cycle (Der Balintol-Zyklus - originally published in German only):

- 44. Intrigue of Antares (Die Intrige von Antares, 1993; English ebook edition Jul. 2008)
- 45. Gangs of Antares (Die Banditen von Antares, 1994; English ebook edition Jul. 2008)
- 46. Demons of Antares (Die Dämonen von Antares, 1994; English ebook edition Jun. 2014)
- The Saga of Dray Prescot: The Balintol Cycle I (Aug. 2015; omnibus including vols. 44-46)
- 47. Scourge of Antares (Die Geißel von Antares, 1994; English ebook edition Jul. 2014)
- 48. Challenge of Antares (Die Fehde von Antares, 1995; English ebook edition Jul. 2014)
- 49. Wrath of Antares (Der Zorn von Antares, 1996; English ebook edition Aug. 2014)
- The Saga of Dray Prescot: The Balintol Cycle II (Aug. 2015; omnibus including vols. 47-49)

=== Spectre cycle ===
The Spectre cycle (Der Phantom-Zyklus - originally published in German only):

- 50. Shadows over Kregen (Schatten über Kregen, 1996; English ebook edition Sep. 2014) (stand-alone novel)
- 51. Murder on Kregen (Mord auf Kregen, 1997; English ebook edition Oct. 2014)
- 52. Turmoil on Kregen (Aufruhr auf Kregen, 1997; English ebook edition Nov. 2014)
- The Saga of Dray Prescot: The Spectre Cycle (Sep. 2015; omnibus including vols. 50-52)
- 53. Betrayal on Kregen (Verrat auf Kregen, unpublished eleven page fragment)
