= Land Beyond the Map =

1961 short science fiction novel written by Kenneth Bulme

- First edition
- Author: Kenneth Bulmer
- Cover artist: Jerome Podwil
- Language: English
- Genre: Science fiction novel
- Publisher: Ace Books
- Publication date: 1965
- Publication place: United States
- Media type: Print (Paperback)
- Pages: 136 pp

Land Beyond the Map is a short science fiction novel written by Kenneth Bulmer. It originally appeared in the magazine Science Fantasy in 1961 under the title "The Map Country". It was subsequently enlarged and published by Ace Books in 1965. It was published in an Ace Double, which also contained another short novel, Fugitive of the Stars by Edmond Hamilton, on the opposite side.

== Plot summary ==
Roland Crane, a wealthy map collector and dilettante archaeologist, is visited by Polly Gould, a cousin of an army friend who has disappeared. She is obsessed with locating a map of Ireland, torn down the middle, that her cousin discovered just before he vanished. This same map had formerly been in the possession of Roland and his family, and transported them into a strange alternate dimension. Polly believes the map holds the key to recovering her cousin, and that Roland can help her find it. Roland reluctantly agrees to help.

The two travel to Ireland and begin their search, soon learning that someone else, a mysterious and sinister man, also seeks the map. The mystery deepens when they witness the apparent abduction of another man by a strange "eye" in the sky. Finally they are offered the map at an enormous price by an old man who speaks of having used it to travel to another place, full of both treasure and terror. He fears to go back himself, as his son-in-law was trapped there.

Accepting the challenge, Roland and Polly buy and follow the map, and when they reach the place corresponding to the tear in the map, they are transported into the alternate dimension hinted at.

Though this novel bears some thematic similarities to Bulmer's later Keys to the Dimensions series, it is otherwise unrelated.
