= Cycle of Nemesis =

1967 novel by Kenneth Bulmer

- Cover of the first edition.
- Author: Kenneth Bulmer
- Language: English
- Genre: Science fiction
- Publisher: Ace Books
- Publication date: 1967
- Publication place: United States
- Media type: Print (paperback)
- Pages: 190

Cycle of Nemesis is a science fiction novel by the British writer Kenneth Bulmer. It was first published in 1967.

== Plot summary ==
The novel begins in a near future world of ray guns and robots, but ends up marching all over time. Khamushkei the Undying, a horror out of space, destroyed an ancient civilization on earth, but ended up locked away in a Time Vault. After seven millennia, the vaults seals are giving way, and five average citizens are caught up in a race to reseal the vault - even though they know it will cost one of them her life.
