= Swordships of Scorpio =

1973 novel by Kenneth Bulmer

- Cover of first edition
- Author: Kenneth Bulmer
- Cover artist: Tim Kirk
- Language: English
- Series: Dray Prescot series
- Genre: Sword and planet
- Publisher: DAW Books
- Publication date: 1973
- Publication place: United States
- Media type: Print (Paperback)
- ISBN: 0860078361
- Preceded by: Warrior of Scorpio
- Followed by: Prince of Scorpio

Swordships of Scorpio is a science fiction novel by British author Kenneth Bulmer, written under the pseudonym of Alan Burt Akers (Kenneth Bulmer). It is the fourth volume in his extensive Dray Prescot series of sword and planet novels, set on the fictional world of Kregen, a planet of the Antares star system in the constellation of Scorpio. It was first published by DAW Books in 1973.

The Dray Prescot series is made of several cycles of novels, each cycle essentially forming a series within the series. In addition to being the fourth volume in the series as a whole, Swordships of Scorpio is also the fourth volume in the Delian Cycle and, like the second and third volume, is set on the fictional continent of Turismond but also introduces the island of Pandahem for the first time.

The 52 completed novels of the Dray Prescot series were written by Bulmer between 1972 and 1997, when a stroke stopped his writing, also the later Dray Prescot books, after 1988, were originally only published in German. The series is in the spirit of Edgar Rice Burroughs John Carter of Mars series.

== Plot summary ==
The stories follows on directly from Warrior of Scorpio with Dray Prescot being abandoned through treachery in the hostile territories of Turismond. He travels on foot and manages to rescue a young local girl from the hands of a savage tribe. He successfully crosses the Owlarh Wate and eventually reaches the Klackadrin, a natural barrier between the hostile territories and the coastal lands. The Klackadrin is a barrier of poisonous gases and Prescot is taken prisoner by the Phokaym, a lizard-like race, when he tries to cross. He is prepared to be sacrificed in a pit of lizard predators. At this stage the story stops with the explanation that the tapes Dray Prescot recorded in Africa finish here.

The story resumes, now with new tapes sent from South America. Prescot has reached the east coast of Turismond and is recovering in the city of Pa Mejab, a colony of the Tomboram, a nation of the island of Pandahem, a fierce rival of Vallia. Prescot is initially quite weak from his journey through the Klackadrin but recovers and joins a trade caravan as a guard. The caravan is warned by an injured man, Inch of Ng'groga, of an impending attack. Like Seg Segutorio in Warrior of Scorpio, Inch of Ng'groga would become one of Prescots lifelong friends. Like Segutorio, Inch hailed from the continent of Loh, from the southeastern part of it in his case. Prescot and the other guards fought off the attack on the caravan successfully, reached the trading outpost of Pa Weinob and eventually returned to Pa Mejab.

During his time in Pa Mejab, Prescot first learns of the politics and divides of Pandahem and their nation states. Prescot learns that Pa Mejab is a colonial town of the Kingdom of Tomboram, located in the north east of Pandahem and in bitter feud with Menaham, another Pandahemian nation. He also makes the acquaintance of Tilda and her son Pando, who work at the inn he is staying at. When the regular convoy of trade ships arrive at the port, Prescot decides to leave on board one of these ships. He eventually learns that young Pando is the heir to the Kov of Bormark, brother of the King of Tomboram, and that Pando's late father was disinheritated when he married below his status, but that Pando's grandfather, on his death bed, reinstated his son. Prescot talks Tilda into claiming Pando's inheritance and she, in turn, talks Precot into helping them to claim it.

Prescot, Inch, Tilda, and Pando set out on a merchant ship to Pandahem. After a stop-over in the very north of Loh, the ship is caught in a storm and then attacked by pirate swordships. The merchant ship strands on a beach on an island and Prescot, his companions, and most of the crew escape after a short fight. They eventually manage to find passage on another merchant ship and reach Pomdermam, the capital of Tomboram. Prescot thereby visits the island of Pandahem for the first time.

Prescot, with the help of Inch, takes the current Kov of Bormark captive and forces him to confess to the attempted murder of Tilda and Pando he organised in front of King Nemo. Pando is accepted as the new kov by the king, but the later takes offence to the way he was treated by Prescot in the process and has him kidnapped and sent to the galleys as a galley slave. Prescot becomes a rower on one of the Kings swordships, which is eventually captured through a trick by the female pirate Viridian. The slaves are offered to join the pirates and accept. Prescot rises through the ranks, finding himself being placed in charge of the ships artillery. He challenges Viridian on occasion and almost supplants her as leader but holds back as he does not wish to lead the pirates. He is however eventually placed in command of one of the ships. When the pirates liberate the slaves of a swordship of Menaham, Prescot is reunited with Inch who was sent to the galleys for the same reasons as Dray Prescot.

When Prescot receives news from Inch that Menaham has almost overrun Tomobram and that Pando and Tilda are in hiding, he decides to mobilise the pirates against Menaham. The pirate fleet defeats an armada of Menaham and then sails to Pomdermam to save the city just in time before it falls. Prescot rescues Pando, but then, once more in the moment of triumph, is taken away by the Star Lords.

== Publishing ==
The book was first published in English in December 1973. It was first published in German in 1976 as Die Armada von Scorpio. In 2005 the book was published as an E-book by Mushroom Books.

== Book covers ==
The cover of the original US edition was illustrated by Tim Kirk and the second one by Josh Kirby, while the British and first German edition was illustrated by Chris Achilleos and the second German edition was illustrated by Boris Vallejo.
