= Manhounds of Antares =

1974 novel by Kenneth Bulmer

- Cover of first edition
- Author: Kenneth Bulmer
- Cover artist: Jack Gaughan
- Language: English
- Series: Dray Prescot series
- Genre: Sword and planet
- Publisher: DAW Books
- Publication date: 1974
- Publication place: United States
- Media type: Print (Paperback)
- ISBN: 0879976500
- Preceded by: Prince of Scorpio
- Followed by: Arena of Antares

Manhounds of Antares is a science fiction novel by British writer Kenneth Bulmer, written under the pseudonym of Alan Burt Akers. It is the sixth volume in his Dray Prescot series of sword and planet novels, set on the fictional world of Kregen, a planet of the Antares star system in the constellation of Scorpio. It was first published by DAW Books in 1974.

The Dray Prescot series is made of several cycles of novels, each cycle essentially forming a series within the series. In addition to being the sixth volume in the series as a whole, Manhounds of Antares is also the first of six volumes in the Havilfar Cycle. It is set on the fictional continent of Havilfar.

The 52 completed novels of the Dray Prescot series were written by Bulmer between 1972 and 1997, when a stroke stopped his writing, also the later Dray Prescot books, after 1988, were originally only published in German. The series is in the spirit of Edgar Rice Burroughs John Carter of Mars series.

== Plot summary ==
The book follows on directly on the events of Prince of Scorpio with Prescot, Delia and the Emperor returning to the capital of Vallia, Vondium, after the successful battle at the Dragon's Bones. Upon arrival the small group is attacked by a group of the conspirators and Prescot is able to narrowly defeat the attack, save the Emperor and kill one of the leaders of the rebels. In the following days Dray Prescot and Delia then wed in the capital and are paraded around in Vondium. He is also able to secure titles and offices for his friends Inch and Seg from the Emperor to reward them for their loyalty during the uprising. On their wedding night Delia and Prescot are attacked by assassins but survive. Spending happy days in Vallia together Delia gives birth to twins, a boy named Drak and a girl named Lela. Shortly after however, Prescot is taken away by the Star Lords again.

Dray Prescot finds himself on the island of Faol, in the north of Havilfar, as a slave in a slave pen. He realises that the Star Lords wish him to save one of the slaves but he does not know which one. He decides on a woman who declares herself to be Princess Lilah of Hyrklana and learns that the slaves are kept for the purpose of hunting by wealthy Lords of the region. Prescot encounters a Khamorro for the first time, disciples of a hand-to-hand combat order that despises weapons. He learns of the local guides who supposedly risk their lives to enter the slave pens to help the slaves escape during the hunt. Prescot and Lilah are selected for the hunt and follow a guide who disappears under mysterious circumstances during the night. Prescot also for the first time encounters the Jiklos, dog-like humans specifically breed for hunting, which pursue the group of slaves.

Prescot rescues Lilah but then is hurled back to the slave pens by the Star Lords. He continues to attempt to find the correct person to rescue and succeeds every time in rescuing them but is taken back to the pens on each occasion. He learns that the guides in reality are employed by the slave masters to give the slaves false hope of escape and to guide them to certain hunting grounds. After all slaves he originally encountered on his first arrival have either been rescued or have disappeared Prescot finals comes to the conclusion that it must be an old non-human slave women, Mog the Migla, who is his targets. He once more escapes with a slave group which also includes Turko the Khamorro, with the two initially weary of each other but soon becoming friends. Prescot also, for the first time, establishes friendly relations with a Rapa, Rapechak, a fierce bird-like race often employed as mercenaries who he previously fought on occasions.

The group escapes to Yamman, the capital of the Miglas which has been conquered by another nation, the Canops. The Canops are a militaristic human race who were displaced from their home island by an earthquake and who worship the silver Leem, a Leem being a six legged cat-like predator. Prescot learns that Mog, who he rescued, is the high priestess of the Miglas and begins to understand the aim of the Star Lords. When he refuses to bow to the silver Leem in the street Prescot comes in conflict with the Canops military but escapes while his friends are arrested.

Prescot rescues his friends, defeating two Kamorros in hand combat in the process. The small group swims to safety, losing Rapachak in the process. They escape downriver in a boat and hide for a day. Just before taking up their journey away from the land of the Miglas Prescot is visited by the Gdoinye who once more calls him a fool and tasks him with freeing the Migla country from the Canops and restoring Mog to her position. Saddened that he is not permitted to return to Delia and his young children Prescot nevertheless follows the command to return to Yamman.

== Publishing ==
The book was first published in English in August 1974. It was first published in German in 1976 as Die Menschenjäger von Antares. In 2006 the book was published as an E-book by Mushroom Books.

== Book covers ==
The cover of the original US edition was illustrated by Jack Gaughan. The second German edition was illustrated by Boris Vallejo.
