= Kenneth Bulmer =

British writer

- Kenneth Bulmer c. 1956
- Born: 14 January 1921; London, England
- Died: 16 December 2005 (aged 84); Tunbridge Wells, Kent, England
- Occupation: Author
- Spouse: Pamela Buckmaster
- Writing career
- Genre: Science fiction

Henry Kenneth Bulmer (14 January 1921 – 16 December 2005) was a British writer, primarily of science fiction.

== Life ==
Born in London, he married Pamela Buckmaster on 7 March 1953. They had one son and two daughters, and they divorced in 1981. Bulmer lived in Tunbridge Wells, Kent where he died on 16 December 2005.

== Career in science fiction ==
A prolific writer, Bulmer penned over 160 novels and numerous short stories, both under his real name and various pseudonyms. For instance, his long-running Dray Prescot series of planetary romances was initially published as by Alan Burt Akers, and later as by the first-person protagonist of the series, Prescot himself.

Bulmer's works are popular in translation, particularly in Germany, to the extent that in some cases they have been published only in German editions, with the original English-language versions remaining unpublished.

Bulmer did some work in comics, writing Jet-Ace Logan stories for Tiger, scripts for War Picture Library, Lion and Valiant, and helping to create the British comics antihero The Steel Claw. Paul Grist's comics series Jack Staff acknowledges this in the real name of its character The Claw, Ben Kulmer.

Bulmer was also active in science fiction fandom, including travelling to the United States in 1955 as the TransAtlantic Fan Fund (TAFF) delegate.

In the 1970s he edited nine issues of the New Writings in Science Fiction anthology series in succession to John Carnell, who originated the series.

== Pen names and imaginary biographies ==
Bulmer's pseudonyms include Alan Burt Akers, Frank Brandon, Rupert Clinton, Ernest Corley, Peter Green, Adam Hardy, Philip Kent, Bruno Krauss, Karl Maras, Manning Norvil, Chesman Scot, Nelson Sherwood, Richard Silver, H. Philip Stratford and Tully Zetford. Kenneth Johns was a collective pseudonym used for a collaboration with author John Newman. Some of Bulmer's works were published along with the works of other authors under "house names" (collective pseudonyms), such as Ken Blake (used for a series of tie-ins with the 1970s television programme The Professionals; some later books in the series were written by Robert Holdstock), Arthur Frazier, Neil Langholm, Charles R. Pike, and Andrew Quiller. He also ghost-wrote books for Barry Sadler.

In some cases, Bulmer used not only a different name but also included in the books a detailed imaginary biography giving specific personal details substantially different from the true ones. For example, the Viking series published under the name "Neil Langholm" included biographical details intended to create the impression that the series – as appropriate to its subject – was written by a Dane:

Neil Langholm was born in Copenhagen in 1931, but was educated in England at Eton and Oxford. He started his career as a veterinary surgeon but gave up in 1960 to begin writing full time. He is the author of several bestselling western and science fiction series, which he writes under a pseudonym. Mr. Langholm now lives with his wife and five children in Ruislip. His hobbies are breeding dogs and archery.
