= Gor (film) =

- VHS cover
- Directed by: Fritz Kiersch
- Written by: Rick Marx; Peter Welbeck (screenplay)
- Based on: Tarnsman of Gor by John Norman
- Produced by: Avi Lerner; Harry Alan Towers
- Starring: Urbano Barberini; Rebecca Ferratti; Oliver Reed
- Cinematography: Hans Khule
- Edited by: Ken Bornstein; Max Lemon
- Music by: Pino Donaggio
- Distributed by: The Cannon Group, Inc.
- Release date: May 9, 1987 (Cannes Film Festival)
- Running time: 94 minutes
- Countries: United States; South Africa
- Language: English
- Box office: $159,731

Gor is a 1987 science fiction fantasy film. It was loosely based on the 1966 novel Tarnsman of Gor, the first in the Gor series of sword and planet novels. The series was written by philosophy professor and author John Frederick Lange Jr. under his pen name John Norman. There was a sequel to the film, Outlaw of Gor (1989).

== Plot ==
After being snubbed before a weekend getaway by his teaching assistant, socially awkward professor of physics Tarl Cabot accidentally unlocks the magical properties of a ring that transports him to the planet Gor. After his arrival, Cabot encounters a village being attacked by the army of the tyrannical self-appointed priest-king Sarm. Sarm's forces are invading neighboring settlements in an effort to retrieve the Home Stone, a mystical object that creates pathways between Gor and distant Earth. Cabot too is abruptly attacked by Sarm's warriors. After inadvertently killing Sarm's own son during the encounter, he is left for dead in the desert. He awakens to find himself being nursed back to health by Talena (Rebecca Ferratti), a scantily clad barbarian princess of the Kingdom of Ko-ro-ba. Cabot learns that Talena's father, the King, has been captured by Sarm, along with the Home Stone. Cabot travels with Talena on a rescue mission to Sarm's lands, where they are captured. Cabot leads a group of rebels in an escape effort, whereupon Cabot is able to kill Sarm, rescue Talena and her father, and reacquire the Home Stone. Tarl et al. return to Ko-ro-ba, where, Cabot and Talena admit their love for one another. Questioning if his life on Earth is a dream, Cabot activates the Home Stone and is returned to Earth.

== Cast ==
- Urbano Barberini as Tarl Cabot
- Rebecca Ferratti as Talena
- Jack Palance as Xenos
- Paul L. Smith as Surbus
- Oliver Reed as Sarm
- Larry Taylor as King Marlenus
- Graham Clarke as Drusus
- Janine Denison as Brandy
- Donna Denton as Queen Lara
- Jenifer Oltman as Tafa
- Martina Brockschmidt as Dorna
- Anne Power as Beverly
- Arnold Vosloo as Norman
- Chris du Plessis as Sarsam
- Ivan Kruger as Sarm's Rider
- Joe Ribeiro as Auctioneer
- Visser du Plessis as Compound Guard
- Philip Van der Byl as Whipman
- George Magnussen as Old Man
- Fred Potgieter as Brand Master
- Etty Orgad as Hooded Woman
- Amanda Haramis as Hooded Woman
- Eve Joss as Auction Slave
- Bobby Lovegreen as Sarsam's Rider
- Rick Skidmore as Prisoner
- Vic Tearnan as Body Guard
- Andre du Plessis as Body Guard
- Fred Swart as Feast Master
- Nobby Clark as Merchant
- Nigel Chipps as Hup

== Production ==
Cannon Films had initially planned to release the film in September 1987, but the theatrical release was cancelled. Gor was shot back-to-back with its sequel Outlaw of Gor.

== Release ==
The film was theatrically released on May 9, 1987. A home video release followed on December 21, 1988.

== Critical reception ==
Gor was widely panned upon its release (and subsequently remembered) for its poor production value and camp. The film has been the target of criticism for its overt sexual themes and its portrayal of women as slaves to men.

In a 2002 interview with online fanzine The Gorean Voice, John Norman recalled that Ballantine Books, holder of the rights to his novels, balked at the idea of publishing movie tie-in books. He said that Ballantine had to be circumvented in order to make the movie:

Ballantine Books refused to do movie tie-ins to either film; they failed even to answer my letters. My attorney finessed his way around Ballantine's rights department and contacted the legal department at Random House. The movies were made by going over the heads of the censors.
