= Fencer of Minerva =

Original video animation

ミネルバの剣士 (Minerva no Kenshi)
- Genre: Fantasy, Drama, Erotica, Romance
- Original video animation
- Studio: All Products
- Licensed by: NA: U.S. Manga Corps
- Released: 1994 (Japan), 2001 (US)
- Episodes: 5

Fencer of Minerva (ミネルバの剣士, Minerva no Kenshi) is a five episode borderline hentai anime series released in the U.S. by Central Park Media in two DVD volumes.

== Plot summary ==
Set in a world reminiscent of John Norman's Gor novels, the story has political intrigue, adventure, and romance. The main characters are Diana, a royal princess-turned-slave, and Sho, a royal prince and her childhood friend who later becomes her master.

The two were parted ten years before when Randis, Diana's father, had taken the throne of the kingdom of Doria from Sho's father, King Baasen. Several of Randis' guards then tried to kill the young Sho, Baasen's heir and believed him dead when he fell over the mesa where Doria's castle had been built. Diana watched the attack and tried to let her father know, only to see Randis standing over King Baasen's body.

Ten years later, Diana is now the princess of Doria, but hates the position. Her father, now king of Doria, tries to have her married-off to Prince Dunan of the kingdom of Guptia. Diana, however, runs away, fleeing the castle. Disguised as a man, she manages to get a slave called Fina out of a jam and they flee Doria. However, they are soon attacked by creatures as well as nomads. The nomads discover Diana is a girl, but don't listen to her princess story, instead, proceeding to train her and Fina into slaves. While Diana is being whipped, a stranger walks in asking to spend a night, but the nomads want a rumble. The stranger, who is wearing a mask that covers half his face, slaughters one of them and is ready to fight the other nomads. However, after one match with the chief, Teo, the stranger is accepted by the tribe and is allowed to spend the night. When the stranger puts away his dagger, Diana immediately recognizes the stranger as her friend Sho, who she thought had died. Diana is then made Sho's slave. Sho also recognizes Diana and after consummating their relationship, along with the help of the nomads, they proceed to take back Doria.

Unfortunately, the sadistic Prince Dunan from Gupta manages to kill one of the nomads in order to find the whereabouts of the two. Dunan takes Diana back to Doria, where he violates her. Meanwhile, Sho and the nomads start to take over Doria. During a reunion between Diana and Sho, Dunan interrupts but is killed by Diana before he can discover Sho. Afterwards, they go to King Randis and inform him that Doria is being taken over. Randis takes his own life. Sho is made king of Doria but relinquishes the position to Teo. Instead, Sho prepares to travel through the land. When he is ready to begin his journey across the country, Diana comes with him saying she would rather be his slave and be by his side than be free and not be with him. So, they leave Doria and Sho leaves behind his mask.

Some time later, they come across a town which is ruled by the rich. These elitists are led by a girl named Patris. Under the request of her uncle, Yajil, Diana and Sho agree to try to improve her attitude. But, unbeknownst to the pair, Yajil is only using them to get Diana. A little encounter between Diana, Patris and the bodyguard Kyle helps Patris change her attitude. Yajil tricks Patris into going to deliver a document in order to have Sho killed by Kyle. Diana interferes and, in the process, reveals to Patris that Kyle is in love with her. The group confronts Yajil about his deception, after which he escapes in a cowardly fashion.

Kyle leaves also but does not take Patris, as she wants to be Sho's slave. Diana is reluctant to the idea but accepts the proposition. As Sho proceeds to train Patris, Diana goes off alone and cries. The next morning, Sho tells Diana to look for Kyle in the bar. She finds him there and tells him to go back to the house. Upon arrival, Kyle and Diana are shocked to find Patris tied up. Sho offers Kyle to take Patris as his slave, a proposal which both Kyle and Patris happily accept.

Meanwhile, back in Doria, in their desperate search for Dunan, the Guptans try to assassinate Teo, the new king. The siblings, Hanna, who is in love with Gupta's prince Marlon, and Alberto nearly succeed in an assassination attempt but Teo's slave Ulsra manages to save him.

Meanwhile, Sho and Diana are in another town where Diana manages to beat a chess master and take his slave. After a night of training, the chess master wants to buy back the slave. However, Sho tells him there's no need to pay and gladly gives him his slave back. The chess master also tells the couple of the assassination attempt. Sho and Diana quickly go back to Doria and start formulating a plan with the king's adviser Imil. (Fina is in love with Imil and later becomes her master). Sho and Diana become the new king and queen of Doria and, while Teo recovers, they must now travel to Gupta and settle the score.

En route to Gupta, Marlon plants Hanna as a slave in order to gain information. However, Sho and Diana are aware of Hanna's true purpose and use Hanna's feelings for Marlon to their advantage. When Diana beats Hanna in a match, she tells Hanna to ask Marlon to make her his slave. Marlon is reluctant at first but agrees after some talking with Sho. Later, Sho and Diana admit to killing Dunan. However, even if revenge is taken, the conflict will not end. While the conversation takes place, Dorian troops invade Gupta, leaving them no choice but to make amends.

Later, Diana takes Hanna to Marlon where they proceed the slave training. Teo goes back to the nomadic life, living with Ulsra. Before leaving, he has one final conversation with Diana, who reveals she has chosen to remain Sho's slave instead of living as a free woman. She is now known throughout the world as the Slave Queen, inspiring other slaves to be by their master's sides rather than living in freedom.
