= Outlaw of Gor =

- Theatrical release poster
- Directed by: John "Bud" Cardos
- Written by: Peter Welbeck; Rick Marx
- Based on: Outlaw of Gor by John Norman
- Produced by: Avi Lerner; Harry Alan Towers
- Starring: Urbano Barberini; Rebecca Ferratti; Donna Denton; Russell Savadier; Jack Palance
- Cinematography: Johan van de Vyvfer
- Edited by: Mac Errington
- Music by: Pino Donaggio
- Production company: Breton Film Productions
- Distributed by: Cannon International
- Release date: March 21, 1988 (video)
- Running time: 89 minutes
- Countries: United States; South Africa; Canada
- Language: English

Outlaw of Gor (also known as Gor II) is a 1988 adventure fantasy science fiction film directed by John "Bud" Cardos. A sequel to Gor, it is loosely based on the Gor series of novels by John Norman but contains substantial plot and qualitative differences from the original 1967 book Outlaw of Gor.

== Plot ==
While drinking alone one night, reminiscing of his previous adventures on the planet Gor, Professor Tarl Cabot comes across Watney Smith, a fellow professor with a keen interest in women yet little success in pursuing them. Watney insists on accompanying Cabot to his next drinking spot, and Cabot's ring activates during the car journey transporting both him and Watney to Gor. The Elder initiates the teleportation from Gor using a rose quartz (the Home Stone) because of suspicions that Xeno, the Priest, has eyes for the throne. Cabot is overjoyed at the thought of being reunited with his lover Talena, and the townspeople of Koroba are similarly overjoyed at Cabot's return. After fending off a brief attack by slavers, Cabot meets Talena and also discovers that her father, King Marlenus, is now married to an ambitious woman named Lara. At a feast that night, Marlenus announces that he will soon step down from the throne, and he names Cabot to succeed him.

Lara desires the throne herself, and she gets the high priest Xenos to agree to help assassinate Marlenus. She then recruits the easily persuaded Watney to provide her with an alibi and proceeds to kill Marlenus, framing Cabot for the murder. While Cabot protests his innocence, and Talena believes him, the guards capture her, and Cabot is forced to flee along with his diminutive sidekick, Hup. Recognising the danger that Cabot represents, Lara and Xenos hire a "Hunter" to pursue and capture him. In the meantime, Lara betrays Watney and has him thrown in the dungeon, and she attempts to have Talena killed by putting her in a fight with two female gladiators, only for Talena to easily triumph.

In the desert, Cabot and Hup encounter another band of slavers, and they rescue a female slave after attacking the slavers' encampment. That night, the Hunter finds Cabot, Hup, and the freed slave, and captures them while they sleep. Upon being brought back to Koroba, the three are thrown into the dungeon by Lara, despite Xenos's attempts to persuade her that Cabot is too dangerous to be left alive even as a hostage. Xenos attempts to persuade Cabot to return to Earth, and Lara tries seducing him, but both attempts are unsuccessful, as Cabot is now determined to bring them to justice over Marlenus's death. The alliance between Lara and Xenos breaks down, with the former becoming frustrated at Xenos's lack of loyalty and the latter realising just how disastrous it would be for Lara to rule Koroba. This leads to the two double-crossing and attempting to kill each other, though Lara's attempt ends up being the successful one.

The following day, Cabot, Talena, Hup and Watney are brought outside the castle for a ceremonial execution. However, the four fight off their executioners until Lara sends in her entire guard and the Hunter, overwhelming the four. As the Hunter prepares to strike the death blow on Cabot, Watney reveals that Lara was the actual killer of Marlenus, the Hunter believes this without question and throws a spear at Lara, immediately killing her.

With Cabot and Talena now crowned King and Queen, respectively, they prepare to finally consummate their relationship. However, Cabot's ring then starts glowing, causing him to be worried that he's about to be sent back to Earth. Instead, Watney ends up being the person sent back to Earth, where he promptly finds himself being arrested for jaywalking in a busy road.

== Cast ==
- Urbano Barberini as Cabot
- Rebecca Ferratti as Talena (credited as Rebecca Ferrati)
- Jack Palance as Xenos
- Donna Denton as Lara
- Russel Savadier as Watney
- Nigel Chipps as Hup
- Alex Heynsas as Elder
- Tullio Moneta as Ost (credited as Tulio Monetta)
- Larry Taylor as Marlenus
- Michael Brunner as Targus
- Michelle Clarke as Vera
- Christobel d'Ortez as Alicia (credited as Christobel D'Ortez)
- Jean Gilpin as shop lady
- Natasha Piotrowski as Lady Tima
- Nicole Gruchy as leather lady
- Martina Brockschmidt as barbarian woman

== Production ==
Cannon Films had Outlaw of Gor shot back-to-back with Gor.

== Release ==
The film was released direct-to-video on March 21, 1989.

== Mystery Science Theater 3000 ==
Under the name Outlaw, the film was featured in episode #519 of Mystery Science Theater 3000. The episode debuted December 11, 1993, on Comedy Central. The episode marked the end of the invention exchanges between the Satellite of Love and the evil scientists in Deep 13, a feature of the show since the beginning. Kevin Murphy claims this change was made to fit with the non-technical nature of the character of new host Mike Nelson.

Writer (and later performer on the show) Mary Jo Pehl wrote, "The real highlight of this baby is Jack Palance in a stunning array of goofy hats." The episode also featured host Mike Nelson and his robot pals singing "Tubular Boobular Joy", an original song about the plentiful bare flesh displayed by the actors in the film, along with many in-movie riffs about the scantily clad performers.

Outlaw ranks highly with fans, finishing #38 out of 177 in a poll of MST3K Season 11 Kickstarter backers. Writer Jim Vorel concurred almost exactly, placing the episode #43 (out of 197 total MST3K episodes). Vorel wrote, "Highlights include the ditzy queen, Cabot’s white-haired little person sidekick, and good old surly Jack Palance, playing the Jafar-esque grand vizier role and looking like he absolutely detests having to be in this movie." In an article at Vulture, writer Courtney Enlow lists Outlaw as one of the series' 25 essential episodes.

The MST3K version of Outlaw was included as part of the Mystery Science Theater 3000, Volume XXX DVD collection, released by Shout! Factory on July 29, 2014. The other episodes in the four-disc set include The Black Scorpion (episode #113), The Projected Man (episode #901), and It Lives by Night (episode #1010). Special features on the Outlaw disc include interviews with producer Danny Learner discussing producer Harry Alan Towers, an interview with director John "Bud" Cardos and a feature on the novels of John Norman, who created Gor.
