= Ghost Dance (disambiguation) =

The Ghost Dance is a Native American ceremony.

Ghost Dance may also refer to:

== Books ==
- Ghost Dance (novel), a 1970 historical fiction novel by John Norman
- Ghost Dance, the third novel in a children's fantasy trilogy by Susan Price
- The Ghost Dance: The Origins of Religion, a 1970 nonfiction book by Weston La Barre

== Film and television ==
- The Ghost Dance (film), a 1982 American Western slasher film
- Ghost Dance (film), a 1983 British drama film
- "Ghost Dance", the sixth and final episode of Into the West

== Music ==
- Ghost Dance (band), a British gothic rock and post-punk band

=== Albums ===
- Ghost Dance (Brian Tarquin album), 1996
- Ghost Dance (The Cult album), a 1996 album by The Cult
- Ghost Dance (The Pine Hill Haints album), 2007

=== Songs ===
- "Ghost Dance", a 1978 song by the Patti Smith Group on the album Easter
- "Ghost Dance", a 1994 song by Robbie Robertson on the album Music for The Native Americans
- "Ghost Dance", a 1997 song by Cusco on the album Apurimac III: Nature-Spirit-Pride
- "Ghost Dance", a 2007 song by Tomahawk on the album Anonymous
- "Ghost Dance", a 2008 song by Lite on the album Phantasia

== See also ==
- Butoh, a Japanese dance form
- Ghost Dance War, an 1890–1891 armed conflict between the Lakota and the United States
- Ghost shirt, a garment worn by some of the dancers in the ceremonies
- "Ghostdancing", a 1983 song by Simple Minds
- Spirit Dance (disambiguation)
