= Imaginative Sex =

1974 non-fiction book by John Norman

- First edition
- Author: John Norman
- Language: English
- Genre: Non-fiction
- Publication date: 1974
- Publication place: United States
- Media type: Print (paperback)

Imaginative Sex is a 1974 non-fiction book by John Norman which includes a list of male-dominant/female-submissive heterosexual BDSM-type sexual fantasy scenarios, and suggested guidelines as to how a couple can act them out in order to improve their sex life.

== Publication ==
First published in paperback form in 1974 by fiction publisher DAW Books, the then-publisher of Norman's Gor series (and distributed through the same channels as the science-fiction and fantasy paperbacks in DAW's line), the book was then republished in 1997 by Rhinoceros Books, a division of the adult book publishing company Masquerade Books, with a new foreword by noted BDSM author Patrick Califia. According to Califia, the original 1974 edition of the book "was one of the first above-ground nonfiction books to offer a rationalization for dominant/submissive role-playing and some instructions about how to do it". However, the book does not use the terminology which later became common in BDSM circles "for the very simple reason that the jargon and conventions we take for granted had not been created when he wrote the book". While Norman focuses exclusively on male-dominant heterosexual couples, "Imaginative Sex could, however, be used by readers of any sexual orientation or gender", according to Califia, since "Norman is very good at pinpointing archetypal situations that are ideal for building the tension and polarization crucial to a good scene" and "It's fairly easy to adapt these scenarios to any S/M or D/S relationship".

== Outline ==
In the book, Norman states that one of his goals as a writer is to allow people's imaginations to become "sexually liberated". He encourages married couples to use sexual fantasies and role playing in order to enliven their sex lives and explore the mental and spiritual aspects of sexual intercourse. While Norman defends his male dominant/female submissive psychosexual theories (which also underlie the Gor books), it is notable that he does not advise couples to attempt to adopt the customs and institutions of the fictional planet Gor in any literal or simplistic way. Norman places more emphasis on "pair-bonding" and stable heterosexual relationships than in the Gor books, and when fantasy-scenario whippings are to be enacted, for example, Norman recommends that the man sharply clap his hands together, "while the slave reacts as if being whipped".
