= Polygraff =

Canadian anthology

- Categories: Anthology of short stories in science fiction, fantasy, horror, pulp, and other genres of speculative fiction.
- Frequency: Quarterly
- First issue: June 2009
- Final issue: January 2012
- Company: Polymancer Studios, Inc.
- Country: Canada
- Language: English
- Website: www.polymancer.com
- ISSN: 1918-655X

Polygraff was a quarterly anthology of short stories in science fiction, fantasy, horror, pulp, cyberpunk, and other genres of speculative fiction. It was available in print since 2009. As of July 2010, Polygraff had completed its first volume of publication, consisting of 4 issues.

The contents of Polygraff included short stories, an editorial, publication reviews and interviews. The magazine featured an in-depth interview with Gor author John Norman in Volume 1, Issue No. 2. This was the only known interview with Mr. Norman currently in print (at that time).

== See also ==
Polymancer magazine, another publication by the company that produces Polygraff.

== Notes ==
- Polygraff Volume 1, Issue No. 1 (2009)
- Polygraff Volume 1, Issue No. 2 (2010)
- Polygraff Volume 1, Issue No. 3 (2011)
- Polygraff Volume 1, Issue No. 4 (2012)
