= Polymancer =

Canadian roleplaying games magazine

- Editor: Staff
- Categories: Role-playing games
- Frequency: Quarterly
- First issue: December 2004
- Final issue: 2011
- Company: Polymancer Studios, Inc.
- Based in: Montréal
- Language: English
- Website: www.polymancerstudios.com
- ISSN: 1708-4474

Polymancer was a magazine covering roleplaying games and related hobbies such as miniatures, wargaming, and LARPs. The magazine was published in Canada by Polymancer Studios Inc. It was distributed across the United States, across Canada, in the UK, in Australia, and in New Zealand, as well as having hard copies archived with Archives Canada. The first issue was published in 2004 and it ran for 32 issues.

== Nature and content ==
Polymancer's articles and scenarios were written without reference to any specific rules system - there were a few exceptions to this rule where specific roleplaying game rule systems were referenced. The magazine for the most part was “system-independent” so that “players of different game systems could make use of them”

The magazine covered many gaming genres such as fantasy, science fiction, horror, modern day, pulp. Most roleplaying game magazines at that time, just covered fantasy, in large measure due to Dungeons & Dragons, a fantasy RPG that was (and continues to be) the most popular RPG of its kind.

Polymancer was different from many magazines that covered RPGs by being printed. Many gaming magazines such as Pyramid were only available online. The April 19, 2007 announcement that Paizo Publishing's license to produce Dragon and Dungeon magazines was to end in September 2007, without being renewed, left Polymancer as one of the few printed RPG hobby magazines geared towards consumers left (see the Wikipedia roleplaying game magazines category for a list). (Wizards announced that the two magazines will be replaced by a yet-unspecified "online initiative".)

There was a complete adventure scenario in every issue of the magazine, which remained for the life of the publication as being “playable right out of the box.” A scenario map was included in each issue's center spread. There was also downloadable material to aid the gamemaster available on the publisher's web site for most of the scenarios.

Articles in Polymancer tended to be long (over four pages) and the black and white illustrations differed from the color artwork found in Dragon. Polymancer was comparable to how Dragon was in the 1980s. The articles in Polymancer were eclectic but they appeared under a few regular headings:

- “Jousting With Words” was the editorial. An opinion piece by the editor.
- “The Lich’s Niche” was a ranting opinion column written in the form of an interview with a lich.
- “Tech Talk” was about ways to use technology (especially computers) in gaming. It did not last beyond 2006.
- “Gaming Digital” was about play by email games.
- “The Gauntlet” was generally a column dealing with problems gamemasters might face and how to solve them. They tended to be instructional in tone.
- “Mojo” was Polymancer's own generic game rules system. Each article grew the rule system in a serialized manner, it also presented additional rules should a particular entry for that issue required them. Mojo was announced in issue #2 with the description that it was meant to be easy to convert to other game systems. Mojo was available for free from the magazine's website.
- “Plot Fodder” was about creating adventure ideas or more importantly adventure seeds and threads from everyday or general topics.

== Adventure scenarios ==
There was a full adventure scenario in every issue. During its run, Polymancer had horror, fantasy, post-apocalyptic, science fiction, pulp, cyberpunk, and Espionage scenarios. One scenario was written to be played as a set of linked miniatures wargame battles, as an RPG adventure, or both. Most Polymancer adventures were written for use with any RPG rules system, however, three adventures were written for specific RPGs: C.J. Carella's Witchcraft (by Eden Studios), Jovian Chronicles (by Dream Pod 9), and HARP (by I.C.E.). The latter two adventures had the statistics that were compatible with the rules for the games the adventures were written for side-by-side with Polymancer's own "Mojo" rules system (see below), which was written to be convertible into many other game rules systems. The Witchcraft adventure contained very few references to rules so it was hoped to be easily convertible into the rules for other horror RPGs.

== Comics ==
More than one comic (or cartoon) appeared in Polymancer magazine during its publication run. There was a serial comic called “SideQuest” about a group of rolepayers that appeared in issues 1 through 8. As well as a one panel cartoon entitled "Quotable Quotes", that started in issue #8; this one panel cartoon was based on humorous quotes from games that were supplied the magazine's readership. There was also "Dice Quest" which began in issue #10, a 4 panel cartoon about the dice used by roleplayers; the characters being anthropomorphized polyhedral dice.

== Games Published in Polymancer magazine ==
As of May 2009, three game rules systems had been published in Polymancer magazine as articles, Mojo, (a generic multipurpose rules system designed for the magazine) PUMMEL!, (a rules lite system designed for use by and inclusion in Polymancer during its initial publication run) and Space PUMMEL!. (a rules lite system designed for use by and inclusion in Polymancer during its initial publication run). Each of these game rules systems were implemented in Polymancer magazine in order to allow the content to contain usable game stats, while maintaining the publication's policy of being easily convertible to rules systems that the magazine's readers would prefer to use themselves. Each of these game systems was playable on its own, however.

=== Mojo ===
Mojo RPG Rules System
- Designers: Polymancer Studios Inc.
- Publishers: Polymancer Studios Inc.
- Publication: 2004
- Genres: Universal
- Systems: Mojo

Mojo was a free role-playing game system designed to adapt to any campaign setting. The Mojo rules system were created by Polymancer Studios, Inc. in 2004 and was first offered in the publication in 2004, and first serialized in Polymancer in January 2005.

==== Purpose of Mojo ====
Mojo was a roleplaying game rules system developed by Polymancer Studios, Inc.. Mojo was described in the pages of Polymancer magazine as a "percentile-based system" and in Polymancer Studios's press releases as "the infinitely convertible‚ roleplaying rules system".

The Mojo RPG was created as an "ultrageneric, barebones RPG system" The publisher described this rules system as one that was designed so that game statistics for tasks, skills, items, magic spells, and so on could be easily converted to their equivalents in other RPGs. They did this so that adventure scenarios, equipment articles, and scenario based content could contain material with relevant stats, and still be useful to as many different kinds of RPG players as possible. It was stressed that Polymancer Studios did not intend to create another generic RPG as a product, but rather as a tool to make the magazine more relevant. This was repeatedly stated by people who worked for Polymancer Studios in the magazine itself, and also in podcast interviews

==== Format of publication ====
Mojo was first introduced in Polymancer Volume 1, Issue #2. The rules have been published incrementally, in the pages of Polymancer magazine, one section of rules at a time, with each rules section being a magazine article. For example, the Mojo article in Volume 1 Issue #4 of Polymancer covered character generation, while the Mojo article in Volume 2 Issue #4 of Polymancer was a set of psionics rules.

As of May 2009, there were 16 published Mojo articles in Polymancer magazine.

==== Basic rules ====
Although based on percentile dice, Mojo differed from other percentile-based games such as Call of Cthulhu and Rolemaster. Basic task resolution was accomplished by rolling under the character's attribute + relevant skill + a modifier set by the gamemaster on an ad hoc basis. Combat used the same system.

A free PDF of the Mojo rules system was available from the publisher's website.

==== Mojo history ====
- 2002 - Mojo Rules set entered final playtesting.
- 2003 - Basic Mojo Rules available to public.
- 2004 - Mojo Advanced released to public.
- 2005 through 2009
- Polymancer magazine (Volume #1, Issue #2) - Introduction to Mojo.
- Polymancer magazine (Volume #1, Issue #3) - Task Resolution in Mojo.
- Polymancer magazine (Volume #1, Issue #4) - Character Creation I: Skills and Attributes in Mojo.
- Polymancer magazine (Volume #1, Issue #5) - Character Creation II: Education & Background in Mojo.
- Polymancer magazine (Volume #1, Issue #6) - Fleshing out the Character in Mojo.
- Polymancer magazine (Volume #1, Issue #7) - Equipping for Combat in Mojo.
- Polymancer magazine (Volume #1, Issue #8) - Equipping Your Character II, Mojo.
- Polymancer magazine (Volume #1, Issue #9) - Character Advancement in Mojo.
- Polymancer magazine (Volume #1, Issue #11) - Combat Resolution in Mojo.
- Polymancer magazine (Volume #2, Issue #1) - Mystical Casting in Mojo.
- Polymancer magazine (Volume #2, Issue #2) - Schools of Magic in Mojo.
- Polymancer magazine (Volume #2, Issue #4) - Psionics I: Mojo.
- Polymancer magazine (Volume #2, Issue #5) - Psionic II: Mojo.
- Polymancer magazine (Volume #2, Issue #6) - Martial Arts I: Mojo.
- Polymancer magazine (Volume #2, Issue #7) - Martial Arts II: Mojo.

=== PUMMEL! ===
PUMMEL! (Pick-Up Multigenre Miniatures, Easy to Learn) was a set of quick miniatures wargame rules, designed for adaptability to RPGs, so that RPG scenarios in Polymancer magazine could have large-scale combats.

=== Space PUMMEL! ===
Space combat and ship design rules, based on PUMMEL!.

== See also ==
- Polygraff, a quarterly anthology of science fiction, fantasy, horror, pulp, and other genres of speculative fiction; also published by Polymancer Studios, Inc.
- Polyglot, a game and entertainment industry newsletter, also published by Polymancer Studios, Inc.
