= Jack Palance =

American actor (1919–2006)

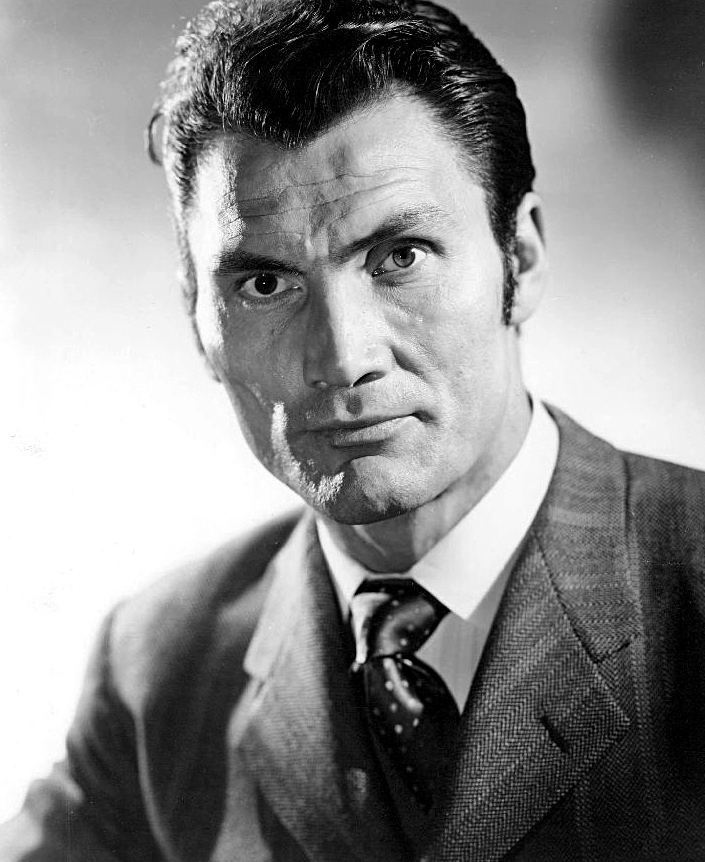
- Palance in 1954
- Born: Volodymyr Palahniuk; February 18, 1919; Lattimer Mines, Pennsylvania, U.S.
- Died: November 10, 2006 (aged 87); Montecito, California, U.S.
- Other names: Jack Brazzo; Walter Palance; Walter J. Palance; Walter Jack Palance
- Occupation: Actor
- Years active: 1947–2004
- Spouses: Virginia Baker (m. 1949; div. 1968); Elaine Rogers (m. 1987)
- Children: 3; including Holly
- Military career
- Allegiance: United States
- Branch: United States Army; Army Air Forces
- Service years: 1942–1944
- Rank: 2nd Lieutenant
- Conflicts: World War II

Walter Jack Palance (/ˈpæləns/ PAL-əns; born Volodymyr Palahniuk; February 18, 1919 – November 10, 2006) was an American actor. He gained stardom for his masculine portrayals of men in neo-noirs, crime dramas and westerns. He acted on stage and screen earning an Academy Award, a Golden Globe Award and a Primetime Emmy Award. He received a star on the Hollywood Walk of Fame in 1960.

Born in Lattimer Mines, Pennsylvania, the son of Ukrainian immigrants, Palance served in the United States Army Air Forces during World War II. He attended Stanford University before pursuing a career in the theater, winning a Theatre World Award in 1951. He made his film acting debut in Elia Kazan's Panic in the Streets (1950). He was nominated for three Academy Awards, all for Best Actor in a Supporting Role, for his roles in Sudden Fear (1952) and Shane (1953), and winning almost 40 years later for City Slickers (1991).

Beginning in the late 1950s, he would work extensively in Europe, notably in a memorable turn as a charismatic-but-corrupting Hollywood mogul in Jean-Luc Godard's Contempt (1963). Palance is also known for his roles in The Big Knife (1955), Attack (1956), Barabbas (1961), The Professionals (1966) and Monte Walsh (1970) with later roles in Young Guns (1988), Tango & Cash (1989), and Batman (1989).

On television, he won the Primetime Emmy Award for Best Single Performance by an Actor for the Playhouse 90 teleplay Requiem for a Heavyweight (1957). He also portrayed the title character in the TV movie Bram Stoker's Dracula (1973). He hosted Ripley's Believe It or Not! (1982–86). Off-screen, he was involved in the Ukrainian American community and served as a chairman of the Hollywood Trident Foundation.

== Early life ==
Palance was born Volodymyr Palahniuk on February 18, 1919, in Lattimer Mines, Pennsylvania, the son of Anna (née Gramiak) and Ivan Palahniuk, an anthracite coal miner. His parents were Ukrainian Catholic immigrants, his father a native of Ivane-Zolote in southwestern Ukraine (modern Ternopil Oblast) and his mother from the Lviv Oblast. One of six children, he worked in coal mines during his youth before becoming a professional boxer in the late 1930s.

Boxing under the name Jack Brazzo, Palahniuk lost his only recorded match, in a four-round decision on points, to the future heavyweight contender Joe Baksi in a Pier-6 brawl rough fight. Other sources record him winning 15 consecutive club fights, with 12 knockouts. Years later he recounted: "Then I thought, 'You must be nuts to get your head beat in for $200.' The theater seemed a lot more appealing."

=== World War II ===
Palance enlisted in the United States Army Air Forces during World War II, and was trained as a pilot. He suffered head injuries and burns during a 1943 crash of a B-24 Liberator bomber he was co-piloting, with sources citing it as sustained either in a patrol off the California coast or a training flight near Tucson, Arizona (at what is now Davis–Monthan Air Force Base). He was discharged in 1944 after undergoing reconstructive surgery, which contributed to his distinctively gaunt appearance.

According to some sources he was awarded a Purple Heart, though he does not appear on official rolls for the decoration. Purple Hearts are not awarded for training injuries.

=== College ===
Palance won a football scholarship to the University of North Carolina at Chapel Hill but left after two years, disgusted by commercialization of the sport.

After the war, Palance enrolled at Stanford to study journalism, but switched to drama. He left one credit shy of graduating to pursue a career in the theater. During his university years, he worked as a short order cook, waiter, soda jerk, lifeguard at Jones Beach State Park, and photographer's model.

It was around this time that he changed his name to Walter Jack Palance, reasoning that most people could not pronounce his birth name and deriving his new surname from the original one. In an episode of What's My Line?, he described how no one could pronounce his last name, and how it was suggested that he be called Palansky. From that he decided just to use Palance instead.

== Career ==
=== 1947–1959: Broadway debut and film stardom ===
In New York City, Palance studied method acting under Michael Chekhov, while working as a sportswriter. He made his Broadway debut in 1947 as a Russian soldier in The Big Two, directed by Robert Montgomery. Palance's acting break came as Marlon Brando's understudy in A Streetcar Named Desire, and he eventually replaced Brando on stage as Stanley Kowalski. Palance appeared in two plays in 1948 with short runs, A Temporary Island and The Vigil. He made his television debut in 1949.

Palance made his big-screen debut in Panic in the Streets (1950), directed by Elia Kazan, who had directed Streetcar on Broadway. He played a gangster, and was credited as "Walter (Jack) Palance". That year he was featured in Halls of Montezuma (1951), about United States Marines during World War II. He returned to Broadway for Darkness at Noon (1951) by Sidney Kingsley, which was a minor hit. Palance was second-billed in just his third film, opposite Joan Crawford in the thriller Sudden Fear (1952). His character is a former coal miner, as Palance's father had been. Palance received an Oscar nomination for Best Supporting Actor. He was nominated in the same category the following year for his role as hired gunfighter Jack Wilson in Shane (1953). The film was a huge hit, and Palance became an established film name.

Palance played a villain in Second Chance opposite Robert Mitchum, and was a Native American in Arrowhead (both 1953). He got a chance to play a heroic role in Flight to Tangier (1953), a thriller. He played the lead in Man in the Attic (1953), an adaptation of The Lodger. He was Attila the Hun in Sign of the Pagan with Jeff Chandler, and Simon Magus in the Ancient World epic The Silver Chalice (both 1954) with Paul Newman (who disowned his participation in the film). He had the star part in I Died a Thousand Times (1955), a remake of High Sierra, and was cast by Robert Aldrich in two star parts: The Big Knife (1955), from the play by Clifford Odets, as a Hollywood star; and Attack (1956), as a tough soldier in World War II. In 1955, he had an operation for appendicitis.

Palance was in a Western, The Lonely Man (1957), playing the father of Anthony Perkins, and played a double role in House of Numbers (1957). In 1957, Palance won an Emmy Award for best actor for his portrayal of Mountain McClintock in the Playhouse 90 production of Rod Serling's Requiem for a Heavyweight. Warwick Films hired Palance to play the hero in The Man Inside (1958), shot in Europe. He was reunited with Robert Aldrich and Jeff Chandler when they worked on Ten Seconds to Hell (1959), filmed in West Germany, playing a bomb disposal expert.

=== 1960–1988: International films and return to Hollywood ===
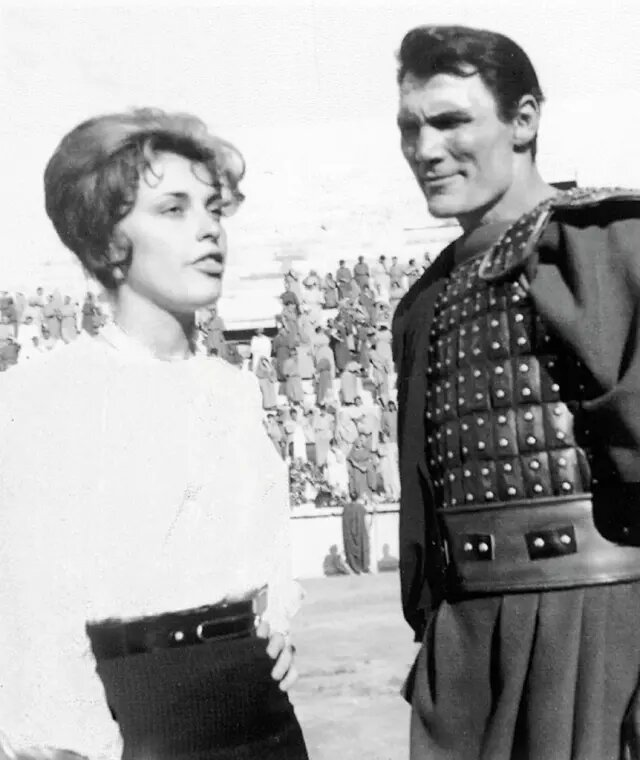
Palance on the set with Sharon Tate during the filming of Barabbas (1961).

He made Beyond All Limits (1959) in Mexico, and Austerlitz (1960) in France, then did a series of films in Italy: Revak the Rebel, Sword of the Conqueror, The Mongols, The Last Judgment, and Barabbas (all 1961), and Night Train to Milan and Warriors Five (both 1962). Jean-Luc Godard persuaded Palance to take on the role of Hollywood producer Jeremy Prokosch in the nouvelle vague movie Le Mépris (1963) with Brigitte Bardot. Although the main dialogue was in French, Palance spoke mostly English.

Palance returned to the U.S. to star in the TV series The Greatest Show on Earth (1963–64). The series only lasted one season, and the 30th and final episode. "You're All Right, Ivy," which starred Buster Keaton, also marked Palance's debut as a director. "For Keaton it was one of his peaks as an actor, an unforgettable role, and for Palance, an artist and a poet as well as an actor, it was the only time in his life that he ever tried directing anything."

In 1964, his presence at a recently integrated movie theater in Tuscaloosa, Alabama, prompted a riot from segregationists who assumed Palance was there to promote civil rights. He played a gangster in Once a Thief (1965) with Alain Delon. In the following year he appeared in the television film Alice Through the Looking Glass, directed by Alan Handley, in which he played the Jabberwock, and had a featured role opposite Lee Marvin and Burt Lancaster in the Western adventure The Professionals. Palance guest-starred in The Man from U.N.C.L.E., and the episodes were released as a film, The Spy in the Green Hat (1967). He went to England to make Torture Garden (1967), and made Kill a Dragon (1968) in Hong Kong.

Palance provided narration for the 1967 documentary And Still Champion! The Story of Archie Moore. He was in the TV film The Strange Case of Dr. Jekyll and Mr. Hyde produced by Dan Curtis, during the making of which he fell and injured himself. In 1969, Palance recorded a country music album in Nashville, released on Warner Bros. Records. It featured his self-penned song "The Meanest Guy that Ever Lived". The album was re-released on CD in 2003 by the Water label (Water 119). His films were often international co-productions by this time: They Came to Rob Las Vegas, The Mercenary (both 1968), The Desperados, and Marquis de Sade: Justine (both 1969). Palance had a part in the Hollywood blockbuster Che! (1969) playing Fidel Castro opposite Omar Sharif in the title role, but the film flopped. Palance went back to action films and Westerns: Battle of the Commandos (1970), The McMasters (1970) and Compañeros (1970).

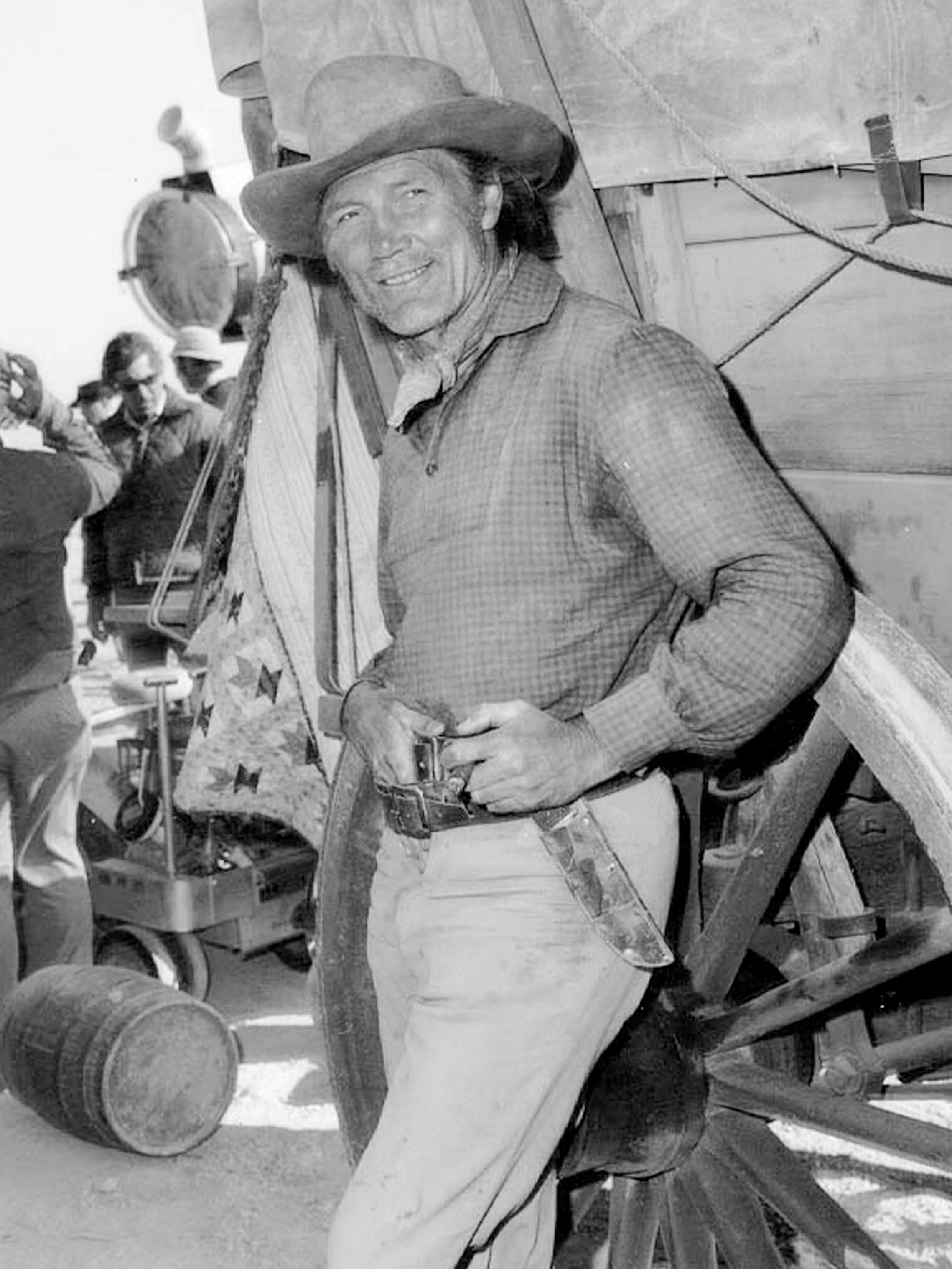
Palance in The Godchild (1974)

Palance had another role in Monte Walsh (1970), from the author of Shane, opposite Lee Marvin, but the film was a box-office disappointment. So too was The Horsemen (1971) with Sharif, directed by John Frankenheimer. He supported Bud Spencer in It Can Be Done Amigo and Charles Bronson in Chato's Land (both 1972), and had the lead in Sting of the West (1972) and Brothers Blue (1973).

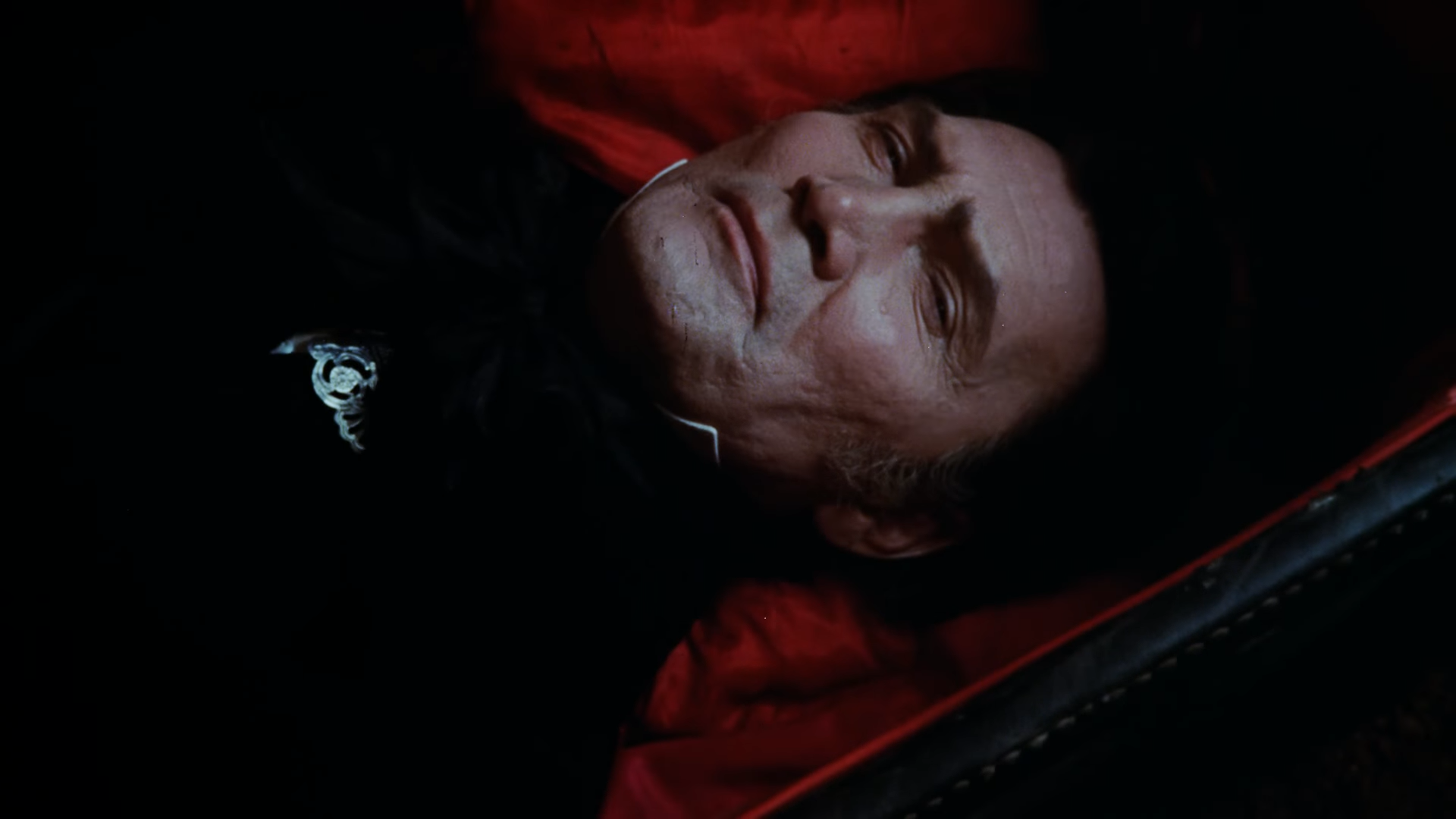
Palance as Count Dracula in Bram Stoker's Dracula (1973)

In Great Britain he appeared in a highly acclaimed TV film, Bram Stoker's Dracula (1973), in the title role; it was directed by Dan Curtis. Three years earlier, comic book artist Gene Colan had based his interpretation of Dracula for the acclaimed Marvel Comics comic book series The Tomb of Dracula on Palance, explaining, "He had that cadaverous look, a serpentine look on his face. I knew that Jack Palance would do the perfect Dracula." Palance went back to Hollywood for Oklahoma Crude (1973) then to England to star in Craze (1974). He starred in the television series Bronk between 1975 and 1976 for MGM Television, and starred in the TV films The Hatfields and the McCoys (1975) and The Four Deuces (1976).

In the late 1970s, Palance was mostly based in Italy. He supported Ursula Andress in Africa Express and The Sensuous Nurse, Lee Van Cleef in God's Gun, and Thomas Milian in The Cop in Blue Jeans (all 1976). He was in Black Cobra Woman; Safari Express, a sequel to Africa Express; Mister Scarface; and Blood and Bullets (all 1976). He traveled to Canada to make Welcome to Blood City (1977) and the US for The One Man Jury (1978), Portrait of a Hitman and Angels Revenge (both 1979). Palance later said his Italian sojourn was the most enjoyable of his career. "In Italy, everyone on the set has a drinking cubicle, and no one is ever interested in working after lunch", he said. "That's a highly civilized way to make a movie." He went back to Canada for H. G. Wells' The Shape of Things to Come (1979).

In 1980, Jack Palance narrated the documentary The Strongest Man in the World by Canadian filmmaker Halya Kuchmij, about Mike Swistun, a circus strongman who had been a student of Houdini. Palance attended the premiere of the film on June 6, 1980, at the Winnipeg Art Gallery. He appeared in The Ivory Ape (1980), Without Warning (1980), Hawk the Slayer (1980), and the slasher film, Alone in the Dark (1982). In 1982, Palance began hosting a television revival of Ripley's Believe It or Not!. The weekly series ran from 1982 to 1986 on the American ABC network. The series also starred three different co-hosts from season to season, including Palance's daughter Holly Palance, actress Catherine Shirriff and singer Marie Osmond. Ripley's Believe It or Not! was in rerun syndication on the Sci-fi Channel (UK) and the Sci-fi Channel (U.S.) during the 1990s. He appeared in the films Gor and Bagdad Café (both 1987).

=== 1989–1995: Career resurgence and City Slickers ===
Palance had never been out of work since his career began, but his success on Ripley's Believe It or Not! and the international popularity of Bagdad Cafe (1987) created a new demand for his services in big-budget Hollywood films.

He made memorable appearances as villains in Young Guns (1988) as Lawrence Murphy, Tango & Cash (1989) and Tim Burton's Batman (1989). He also performed on Roger Waters' first solo album release, The Pros and Cons of Hitch Hiking (1984), and was in Outlaw of Gor (1988) and Solar Crisis (1990).

Palance was then cast as cowboy Curly Washburn in the 1991 comedy City Slickers, directed by Ron Underwood. He quipped:

I don't go to California much any more. I live on a farm in Pennsylvania, about 100 miles from New York, so I can go into the city for dinner and a show when I want to. I also have a ranch about two hours from Los Angeles, but I don't go there very often at all...But I will always read a decent script when it is offered, and the script to City Slickers made sense. Curly (his character in the film) is the kind of man I would like to be. He is in control of himself, except for deciding the moment of his own death. Besides all that, I got paid pretty good money to make it.

Four decades after his film debut, Palance won an Academy Award for Best Supporting Actor on March 30, 1992, for his performance as Curly. Stepping onstage to accept the award, the 6-foot-4-inch (1.93 m) actor looked down at 5 ft 7 in (1.70 m) Oscar host Billy Crystal (who was also his co-star in the movie) and joked, mimicking one of his lines from the film, "Billy Crystal ... I crap bigger than him." He then dropped to the floor and demonstrated his ability, at the age of 73, to perform one-armed push-ups.

The audience loved the moment and host Crystal turned it into a running gag. At various points in the broadcast, Crystal announced that Palance was "backstage on the StairMaster", had bungee-jumped off the Hollywood sign, had rendezvoused with the space shuttle in orbit, had fathered all the children in a production number, had been named People magazine's "Sexiest Man Alive", and had won the New York primary election. At the end of the broadcast Crystal said he wished he could be back next year, but "I've just been informed Jack Palance will be hosting."

Years later, Crystal appeared on Inside the Actors Studio and fondly recalled that, after the Oscar ceremony, Palance approached him during the reception: "He stopped me and put his arms out and went, 'Billy Crystal, who thought it would be you?' It was his really funny way of saying thank you to a little New York Jewy guy who got him the Oscars."

In 1993, during the opening of the Oscars, a spoof of that Oscar highlight featured Palance appearing to drag in an enormous Academy Award statuette with Crystal again hosting, riding on the rear end of it. Halfway across the stage, Palance dropped to the ground as if exhausted, but then performed several one-armed push-ups before regaining his feet and dragging the giant Oscar the rest of the way across the stage. He appeared in Cyborg 2 (1993); Cops & Robbersons (1994) with Chevy Chase; City Slickers II: The Legend of Curly's Gold (1994); and on TV in Buffalo Girls (1995). He also voiced Rothbart in the 1994 animated film The Swan Princess.

=== 1996–2004: Final films ===
Palance's final films included Ebenezer (1998), a TV Western version of Charles Dickens's classic A Christmas Carol, with Palance as Scrooge; Treasure Island (1999); Sarah, Plain and Tall: Winter's End (2000); and Prancer Returns (2001).

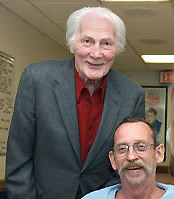
Palance (left) visits a VA Hospital in 2005

Palance, at the time chairman of the Hollywood Trident Foundation, walked out of a Russian Film Festival in Hollywood in 2004. After being introduced, Palance said, "I feel like I walked into the wrong room by mistake. I think that Russian film is interesting, but I have nothing to do with Russia or Russian film. My parents were born in Ukraine: I'm Ukrainian. I'm not Russian. So, excuse me, but I don't belong here. It's best if we leave." Palance was awarded the title of "People's Artist" by Vladimir Putin, president of Russia; however, Palance refused it. In 2001, Palance returned to the recording studio as a special guest on friend Laurie Z's album Heart of the Holidays to narrate the classic poem "The Night Before Christmas". In 2002, he starred in the television movie Living with the Dead opposite Ted Danson, Mary Steenburgen and Diane Ladd. In 2004, he starred in another television production, Back When We Were Grownups, once again directed by Ron Underwood, opposite Blythe Danner; it was his final performance.

== Personal life ==
=== Marriages and family ===
Palance lived for several years around Tehachapi, California. He was married to his first wife, Virginia (née Baker), from 1949 to 1968. They had three children, of whom Holly Palance and another daughter became actors. On New Year's Day, 2003, Virginia was struck and killed by a car in Los Angeles. In May 1987, Palance married his second wife, Elaine Rogers.

=== Interests ===
He painted and sold landscape art, with a poem included on the back of each picture. He was also the author of The Forest of Love, a book of poems published in 1996 by Summerhouse Press.

Palance enjoyed raising cattle on his ranch in the Tehachapi Mountains. He gave up eating red meat after working on his ranch, commenting that he couldn't eat a cow.

He acknowledged a lifelong attachment to his Pennsylvania heritage and visited there when able. Shortly before his death, he sold his farm in Butler Township and put his art collection up for auction.

He was a devout Ukrainian Catholic and a staunch conservative Republican. He was a member of the Hollywood Republican Committee and the Motion Picture Alliance for the Preservation of American Ideals. During his career, he was supportive of the campaigns and administrations of Dwight D. Eisenhower, Barry Goldwater, Richard Nixon, Gerald Ford, Ronald Reagan, George H. W. Bush, Bob Dole, and George W. Bush.

=== Death ===
Palance died at the age of 87 from natural causes at his daughter Holly's house in Montecito, California, on November 10, 2006. Following his death, a memorial service was held at St. Michael's Ukrainian Catholic Church in Hazleton, Pennsylvania.

== Acting credits ==
=== Films ===
Year	Title	Role	Director	Notes
1950	Panic in the Streets	"Blackie"	Elia Kazan	
1951	Halls of Montezuma	"Pigeon" Lane	Lewis Milestone	
1952	Sudden Fear	Lester Blaine	David Miller	
1953	Shane	Jack Wilson	George Stevens	
1953	Second Chance	"Cappy" Gordon	Rudolph Maté	
1953	Arrowhead	Toriano	Charles Marquis Warren	
1953	Flight to Tangier	Gil Walker	Charles Marquis Warren	
1953	Man in the Attic	Slade	Hugo Fregonese	
1954	Sign of the Pagan	Attila	Douglas Sirk	
1954	The Silver Chalice	Simon The Magician	Victor Saville	
1955	Kiss of Fire	"El Tigre"	Joseph M. Newman	
1955	I Died a Thousand Times	Roy Earle / Roy Collins	Stuart Heisler	
1955	The Big Knife	Charles Castle	Robert Aldrich	
1956	Attack	Lieutenant Joe Costa – Fox Company	Robert Aldrich	
1957	The Lonely Man	Jacob Wade	Henry Levin	
1957	House of Numbers	Arnie Judlow / Bill Judlow	Russell Rouse	
1958	The Man Inside	Milo March	John Gilling	
1959	Ten Seconds to Hell	Eric Koertner	Robert Aldrich	
1959	Beyond All Limits	Jim Gatsby	Roberto Gavaldón	
1960	Austerlitz	General Franz von Weyrother	Abel Gance	
1960	The Barbarians	Revak	Rudolph Maté	
1961	Sword of the Conqueror	Alboin	Carlo Campogalliani	
1961	The Mongols	Ogotaï	Andre de Toth	
1961	The Last Judgment	Matteoni	Vittorio De Sica	
1961	Barabbas	Torvald	Richard Fleischer	
1962	Night Train to Milan	Bauer / Schneider	Marcello Baldi	
1962	Warriors Five	Jack	Leopoldo Savona	
1963	Contempt	Jeremy Prokosch	Jean-Luc Godard	
1965	Once a Thief	Walter Pedak	Ralph Nelson	
1966	The Professionals	Raza	Richard Brooks	
1967	Torture Garden	Ronald Wyatt	Freddie Francis	(segment 4 "The Man Who Collected Poe")
1967	Kill a Dragon	Rick Masters	Michael Moore	
1968	Madigan's Millions	Matteo Cirini	Stanley Prager	Uncredited (Note: voice of Riccardo Garrone in the English-language version)
1968	They Came to Rob Las Vegas	Douglas	Antonio Isasi-Isasmendi	
1968	The Mercenary	"Curly" Ricciolo	Sergio Corbucci	
1969	The Desperados	Parson Josiah Galt	Henry Levin	
1969	A Bullet for Rommel	Major John Heston	León Klimovsky	
1969	Marquis de Sade: Justine	Father Antonin	Jesús Franco	
1969	Che!	Fidel Castro	Richard Fleischer	
1969	Legion of the Damned	Colonel Charley MacPherson	Umberto Lenzi	
1970	The McMasters	Kolby	Alf Kjellin	
1970	Monte Walsh	Chet Rollins	William A. Fraker	
1970	Compañeros	John	Sergio Corbucci	
1971	Horsemen	Tursen	John Frankenheimer	
1972	It Can Be Done, Amigo	Sonny Bronston	Maurizio Lucidi	
1972	Chato's Land	Captain Quincey Whitmore	Michael Winner	
1972	Sting of the West	Buck Santini	Enzo G. Castellari	
1972	And So Ends	The Narrator (voice)	Robert Young	Short
1973	Brothers Blue	Captain Hillman	Luigi Bazzoni	
1973	Oklahoma Crude	Hellman	Stanley Kramer	
1974	Craze	Neal Mottram	Freddie Francis	
1974	Dan Curtis' Dracula	Count Dracula	Dan Curtis	
1975	The Four Deuces	Victor "Vic" Morono	William H. Bushnell	
1975	The Great Adventure	William Bates	Gianfranco Baldanello	
1975	Africa Express	Robert Preston / William Hunter	Michele Lupo	
1975	The Sensuous Nurse	Mr. Kitch	Nello Rossati	
1976	God's Gun	Sam Clayton	Gianfranco Parolini	
1976	The Cop in Blue Jeans	Norman Shelley / Richard J. Russo	Bruno Corbucci	
1976	Black Cobra Woman	Judas Carmichael	Joe D'Amato	
1976	Safari Express	Van Daalen	Duccio Tessari	
1976	Mister Scarface	"Scarface" Manzari	Fernando Di Leo	
1976	Blood and Bullets	Duke	Alfonso Brescia	
1977	Welcome to Blood City	Frendlander	Peter Sasdy	
1978	The One Man Jury	Lieutenant Wade	Charles Martin	
1979	Angels' Brigade	Mike Farrell	Greydon Clark	
1979	The Shape of Things to Come	Omus	George McCowan	
1979	Portrait of a Hitman	Jim Buck	Allan A. Buckhantz	
1979	Cocaine Cowboys	Raphael	Ulli Lommel	
1980	Without Warning	Joe Taylor	Greydon Clark	
1980	Hawk the Slayer	Voltan	Terry Marcel	
1982	Alone in the Dark	Frank Hawkes	Jack Sholder	
1987	Gor	Xenos	Fritz Kiersch	
1987	Bagdad Café	Rudi Cox	Percy Adlon	
1988	Young Guns	Lawrence Murphy	Christopher Cain	
1988	Outlaw of Gor	Xenos	John Cardos	
1989	Batman	Carl Grissom	Tim Burton	
1989	Tango & Cash	Yves Perret	Andrei Konchalovsky	
1990	Solar Crisis	Colonel Travis James Richards	Richard C. Sarafian	
1991	City Slickers	"Curly" Washburn	Ron Underwood	
1992	Eli's Lesson	Old Pilot	Peter D. Marshall	
1993	Cyborg 2	Mercy	Michael Schroeder	
1994	Cops & Robbersons	Detective Jake Stone	Michael Ritchie	
1994	City Slickers II: The Legend of Curly's Gold	Duke Washburn	Paul Weiland	
1994	The Swan Princess	Rothbart	Richard Rich	Voice, animated film
1998	The Incredible Adventures of Marco Polo	Beelzebub	George Erschbamer	
1999	Treasure Island	Long John Silver	Peter Rowe	
2001	Prancer Returns	Old Man Richards	Joshua Butler	Direct to DVD
2003	Between Hitler and Stalin	The Narrator	Slavko Nowytski	Voice

=== Television ===
Year	Title	Role	Notes
1950	Lights Out	Unknown Role	Episode: "The Man Who Couldn't Remember"
1952	Westinghouse Studio One	Unknown Role	Episode: "The King in Yellow"
1952	Curtain Call	Unknown Role	Episode: "Azaya"
1952	Westinghouse Studio One	Unknown Role	Episode: "Little Man, Big World"
1952	Gulf Playhouse	Unknown Role	Episode: "Necktie Party"
1953	Danger	Unknown Role	Episode: "Said the Spider to the Fly"
1953	The Web	Unknown Role	Episode: "The Last Chance"
1953	Suspense	Tom Walker	Episode: "The Kiss-Off"
1953	The Motorola Television Hour	Scott Malone / Kurt Bauman	Episode: "Brandenburg Gate"
1953	Suspense	Unknown Role	Episode: "Cagliostro and the Chess Player"
1955	What's My Line	Himself	1 episode
1956	Playhouse 90	Harlan "Mountain" McClintock	Episode: "Requiem for a Heavyweight"
1956	Dick Powell's Zane Grey Theatre	Dan Morgan	Episode: "The Lariat" opposite Constance Ford
1957	Playhouse 90	Monroe Stahr	"The Last Tycoon"
1957	Playhouse 90	Manolete	"The Death of Manolete"
1963	The Greatest Show on Earth	Circus Manager Johnny Slate	Series – top billing, 30 episodes
1964	What's My Line	Himself	Mystery guest
1965	Convoy	Harvey Bell	Episode: "The Many Colors of Courage"
1966	Run for Your Life	Julian Hays	Episode: "I Am the Late Diana Hays"
1966	Alice Through the Looking Glass	Jabberwock	(Live Theatre)
1966	The Man from U.N.C.L.E.	Louis Strago	2 episodes "The Concrete Overcoat Affair: Parts I and II" (reedited as The Spy in the Green Hat)
1968	The Strange Case of Dr. Jekyll and Mr. Hyde	Dr. Henry Jekyll / Mr. Edward Hyde	Television film
1970	NET Playhouse	President Andrew Jackson	"Trail of Tears"
1973	The Sonny & Cher Comedy Hour	Himself	
1974	Bram Stoker's Dracula	Count Dracula	Television film
1974	The Godchild	Rourke	Television film
1975	The Hatfields and the McCoys	Anderson "Devil Anse" Hatfield	Television film
1975–1976	Bronk	Lieutenant Alex "Bronk" Bronkov	Series – top billing, 25 episodes
1979	Buck Rogers in the 25th Century	Kaleel	Episode: "Planet of the Slave Girls"
1979	Unknown Powers	Presenter / The Narrator	
1979	The Last Ride of the Dalton Gang	Will Smith	Television film
1980	The Ivory Ape	Marc Kazarian	Television film
1980	The Golden Moment: An Olympic Love Story	"Whitey" Robinson	Television film
1981	Evil Stalks This House	Stokes	Television film
1981	Tales of the Haunted	Stokes	Episode: "Evil Stalks This House"
1982–1986	Ripley's Believe It or Not!	Himself / Host	Series
1992	Keep the Change	Overstreet	Television film
1994	Twilight Zone: Rod Serling's Lost Classics	Dr. Jeremy Wheaton	Segment: "Where the Dead Are"
1995	Buffalo Girls	Bartle Bone	Television film
1997	I'll Be Home for Christmas	Bob	Television film
1998	Ebenezer	Ebenezer Scrooge	Television film
1999	Sarah, Plain and Tall: Winter's End	John Witting	Television film
2001	Night Visions	Jake Jennings	Segment: "Bitter Harvest"
2001	Living With the Dead	Allan Van Praagh	Television film
2004	Back When We Were Grownups	Paul "Poppy" Davitch	Television film; Film role

=== Theater ===
Year	Title	Role	Venue	Ref.
1947	The Big Two	Russian soldier	Booth Theatre, Broadway	
1948	A Temporary Island	Mr. Boutourlinsky	Maxine Elliott's Theatre, Broadway	
1948	The Vigil	Simon	Royale Theatre, Broadway	
1948	A Streetcar Named Desire	Stanley Kowalski (understudy, replacement)	Ethel Barrymore Theatre, Broadway	
1951	Darkness at Noon	Gletkin	Alvin Theatre, Broadway	
1951	Darkness at Noon	Gletkin	Royale Theatre, Broadway	
1955	Julius Caesar	Cassius	American Shakespeare Theatre, Connecticut	
1955	The Tempest	Caliban	American Shakespeare Theatre, Connecticut	

== Awards and nominations ==
Organizations	Year	Category	Work	Result
Academy Awards	1952	Best Supporting Actor	Sudden Fear	Nominated
Academy Awards	1953	Best Supporting Actor	Shane	Nominated
Academy Awards	1991	Best Supporting Actor	City Slickers	Won
American Comedy Awards	1992	Funniest Supporting Actor in a Motion Picture	City Slickers	Won
Chicago Film Critics Association	1992	Best Supporting Actor	City Slickers	Nominated
DVD Exclusive Awards	2001	Best Supporting Actor	Prancer Returns	Won
Golden Globe Awards	1992	Best Supporting Actor – Motion Picture	City Slickers	Won
Golden Boot Awards	1993	Golden Boot		Won
National Cowboy & Western Heritage Museum	1993	Bronze Wrangler – Factual Narrative	Legends of the West	Won
Primetime Emmy Awards	1957	Best Single Performance by an Actor	Playhouse 90	Won
Theater World Award	1951	Outstanding New York City Stage Debut	Darkness at Noon	Won
WorldFest Flagstaff	1998	Lifetime Achievement Award		Won
Online Film & Television Association	2004	Best Supporting Actor in a Motion Picture or Miniseries	Back When We Were Grownups	Nominated

== Legacy and reception ==
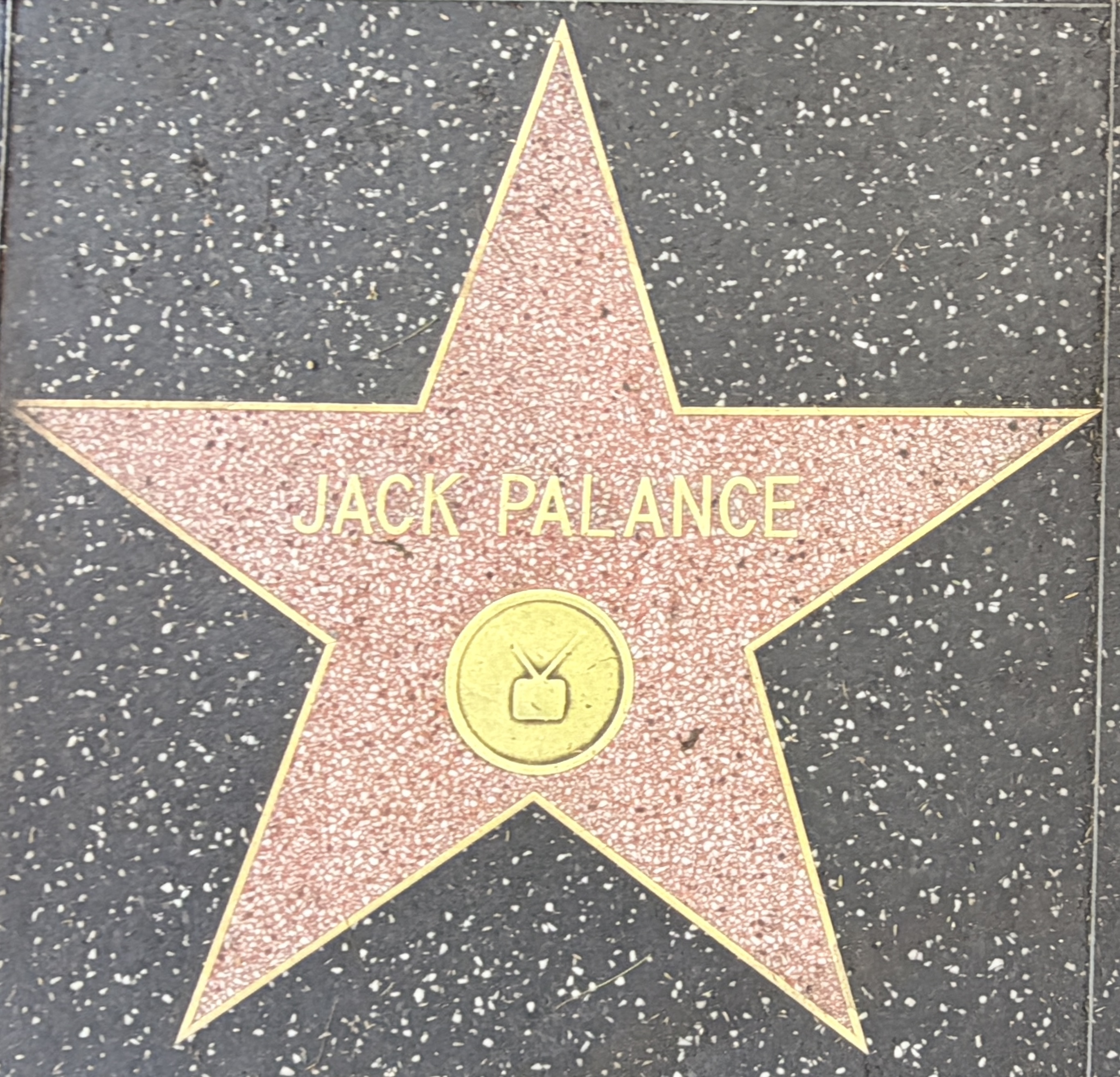
Hollywood Walk of Fame star

Palance has a star on the Hollywood Walk of Fame at 6608 Hollywood Boulevard.

In 1992, he was inducted into the Western Performers Hall of Fame at the National Cowboy & Western Heritage Museum in Oklahoma City, Oklahoma.

According to writer Mark Evanier, comic book creator Jack Kirby modeled his character Darkseid on the actor.

The Lucky Luke 1956 comic Lucky Luke contre Phil Defer by Morris features a villain named Phil Defer who is a caricature of Jack Palance. The song "And now we dance" by punk band The Vandals features the lyrics, "Come on and do one hand pushups just like Jack Palance."

American comedian Bill Hicks incorporated a reference to Palance in one of his most famous routines, likening Palance's character in Shane to how he views the United States' role in international warfare.

Novelist Donald E. Westlake stated that he sometimes imagined Palance as the model for the career-criminal character Parker he wrote in a series of novels under the name Richard Stark.

In 2023, Palance was inducted into the Luzerne County Arts & Entertainment Hall of Fame. He was included among the inaugural class of inductees.

== Discography ==
- Palance, Warner Bros, 1969
