= Lynne Austin =

American actress (born 1961)

Playboy centerfold appearance
- July 1986
- Preceded by: Rebecca Ferratti
- Succeeded by: Ava Fabian

Personal details
- Born: April 15, 1961 (age 65) Plant City, Florida, U.S.
- Height: 5 ft 6.5 in (1.69 m)

Lynne Austin (born April 15, 1961, in Plant City, Florida) is an American model and actress. She was chosen as Playboy's Playmate of the Month in July, 1986 and has appeared in numerous Playboy videos. Austin was also selected as the 1987 Playmate of the Year for the Dutch edition of Playboy.

== Career ==
Austin came to the attention of Playboy's magazine after featuring in an ad campaign for Hooters restaurant as the original "Hooters girl". She was the first waitress hired by one of the chain founders after he had spotted her at a bikini contest. Austin continues to represent Hooters and eventually became a "Hooters Icon." In 1989 she appeared in "Her Cups Runneth Over", a third-season episode of Married... with Children.

Following her Hooters and modeling career, Austin became a radio personality in the Tampa-St. Petersburg, Florida area, appearing daily on the Hooters Nation Morning Show on 1010Sports AM.

In 2008, she was named among the Top Hooters Girls of all time as part of the restaurant chain's 25th anniversary.

== Personal life ==
She was married to Phillies catcher Darren Daulton from 1989 to 1995, with whom she has one child, and is now married to Ron Lacey and they share five children together.

Sherry Arnett	Julie McCullough	Kim Morris	Teri Weigel	Christine Richters	Rebecca Ferratti
Lynne Austin	Ava Fabian	Rebekka Armstrong	Katherine Hushaw	Donna Edmondson	Laurie Carr
