= Hollywood Trident Foundation =

The Hollywood Trident Foundation was formed in 2001 under Jack Palance's leadership to facilitate contact among professionals working in the entertainment industry who are interested in Ukrainian affairs.

== Lobby efforts ==
=== Holodomor ===
The Hollywood Trident Foundation works closely with the Ukrainian Genocide Famine Foundation to interview film survivors of the Holodomor. Peter Baristow reports: "When I came to Chicago last year to interview survivors of the Holodomor, I came with childhood memories of tears—the tears cried by my mother as she remembered how her brothers and sisters died of starvation."

=== Ukrainian Election ===
Members of the Foundation and others petitioned for a fair, transparent and fully internationally monitored election in Ukraine on December 26, 2004.
