= Ghost Dance (novel) =

1970 novel by John Norman

- First edition
- Author: John Norman
- Cover artist: Frank McCarthy
- Language: English
- Genre: Historical fiction
- Publisher: Ballantine Books
- Publication date: 1970
- Publication place: United States
- Media type: Print (paperback)
- Pages: 342
- ISBN: 978-0-7592-9774-6
- OCLC: 429657480

Ghost Dance is a 1970 historical fiction novel by John Norman. A Sioux man and his tradition comes into conflict with a white woman and her civilization as the Wounded Knee Massacre approaches. As with his Gor series, his main body of work, Norman displays both philosophical reaction and an affinity with incorporating historical events into the plotlines of fictional characters.

== Release ==
Ghost Dance was first published in paperback in the United States in 1979 through Ballantine Books. It received an additional printing in 1979, through DAW Books, and an e-book release in 2014, through Open Road Media.

== Reception ==
Charles Beardsley reviewed the novel, praising it for its writing as it was "As good a popular insight into the Indian world of our past as has been projected in some time." Bob James of the Evening Despatch had similar praise, stating that it was "a yarn to stir the heart and blood of everyone who's ever played back street cowboys or gawped at one of those good old-fashioned horse dramas."

In their book Shape Shifting, authors Andrew Macdonald, Gina Macdonald, and MaryAnn Sheridan noted that Ghost Dance could "allow different understandings of what it was like to meet and deal with the many "alien" cultures, not just the Native American, on the frontier."
