= Rebecca Ferratti =

American model

Playboy centerfold appearance
- June 1986
- Preceded by: Christine Richters
- Succeeded by: Lynne Austin

Personal details
- Born: November 27, 1964 (age 61) Helena, Montana, U.S.

Rebecca Ferratti (born November 27, 1964) is an American model and actress. She was Playmate of the Month for June 1986.

She has worked in over 25 films. She has been a dancer in many music videos and has posed in many magazines, including Playboy.

== Early life ==
Ferratti was born in Helena, Montana and grew up in Peoria, Arizona.

== Career ==
After her pictorial in Playboy, she had roles in several B movies. She was the señorita who kissed Martin Short's character at the end of Three Amigos. She appeared in Ace Ventura Pet Detective as the former wife of Randall "Tex" Cobb's character, who hires Ace Ventura to retrieve her Shih Tzu in the film's first scene. In Gor, and Outlaw of Gor she played a lead role. She was an original American Gladiator on TV for Metro-Goldwyn-Mayer Studio. She appeared in one episode of the 1st and 10 TV series with OJ Simpson, and in CBS's Sweating Bullets. Her last films were Wild CAT, Power Elite, and SWAT: Warhead One alongside Olivier Gruner. Ferratti has appeared in over 33 music videos.

== Filmography ==
=== Film ===
Year	Title	Role	Notes
1978	Malibu Beach	-	
1985	Just One of the Guys	Prom Date	
1986	Three Amigos	Hot Señorita	
1987	Gor	Talena	
1987	Beverly Hills Cop II	Playboy Playmate	
1988	Silent Assassins	Miss Amy	
1988	Cheerleader Camp	Theresa Salazar	
1989	Outlaw of Gor	Talena	
1989	How I Got Into College	Game Show Hostess	
1992	Small Kill	Dianna Conti	
1994	Ace Ventura Pet Detective	Sexy Woman	
1994	Hard Vice	Christine	
1995	Embrace of the Vampire	Princess	
1995	To the Limit	Lupe	
1995	Indecent Behavior III	Morenika	
1995	California Heat	Alice	
1995	Cyborg 3: The Recycler	Elexia Cyborg	Video
1998	The Misadventures of James Spawn	The Model	Video
2002	Power Elite	Amanda Davis	
2004	SWAT: Warhead One	Luc's Ex-Wife	Video
2007	WildCat	Prof. Cindy Knox	Video

=== Television ===
Year	Title	Role	Notes
1989	The Associates	Sunset West	Episode: "Gunn and Bullette"
1992	Tropical Heat	Anita	Episode: "Don't Say Nothin' Bad About My Baby"
1996	Erotic Confessions	Rebecca/Ms. Mary	Episode: "Arresting Developments"

=== Music videos ===
Year	Song	Artist
1988	"Stand Up"	David Lee Roth
1988	"Seventeen"	Winger
1989	"Sacred Emotion"	Donny Osmond
1991	"A Lil' Ain't Enough"	David Lee Roth

== See also ==
- List of people in Playboy 1980–1989

Sherry Arnett	Julie McCullough	Kim Morris	Teri Weigel	Christine Richters	Rebecca Ferratti
Lynne Austin	Ava Fabian	Rebekka Armstrong	Katherine Hushaw	Donna Edmondson	Laurie Carr
