= Polyglot (webzine) =

- Screenshot of Polyglot Volume #3 Issue #12, announcing the release of Dungeons & Dragons 4th Edition
- Website type: Game Hobby Industry, Computer Games
- Available in: English
- Owners: Polymancer Studios, Inc.
- Creators: Polymancer Studios, Inc.
- Commercial: Yes
- Launched: 4 March 2005
- Current status: Discontinued

Polyglot was a biweekly online newsletter about the game hobby industry that ceased publication in 2012. It contained official press releases put out by roleplaying game, board game, miniatures, card game, LARP, comic book, and computer game companies. It was published for free as a downloadable PDF. Polyglot was published by Polymancer Studios, Inc., a Canadian publisher that also prints Polymancer magazine.

It was announced on July 19, 2007, that Polyglot would include editorials and product reviews. The webzine's publisher has not previously endorsed the inclusion of original or editorial content.

In the second anniversary issue (the filename for which indicates it was placed on the company's server on March 8, 2007), the publishers of Polyglot stated that there had been over 600,000 "unique downloads" of Polyglot since March 2005. This was stated in the 53rd issue of the webzine, and similar press releases were made in other outlets.

== Format ==
Polyglot's issues were numbered in a volume/issue format that is similar to how printed magazines are numbered; that is, not sequentially. For example, the 27th issue of Polyglot was not "Polyglot issue #27" but "Polyglot Volume #2 Issue #1."

Polyglot was formatted as a US letter size PDF. It was divided into two sections, one for "traditional" games (RPGs, card games, board games, miniatures, etc.) and one for "digital" games. Every page of Polyglot had a banner image of the top containing Polyglot's logo. There are two different logos, one for the "traditional" gaming section and one for the "digital" gaming section. The front page of each of the two sections has a slightly larger logo. The "traditional" gaming section's logo has the slogan "the language of gaming" and the digital section's logo simply says "digital section." In both sections, the logos have different colors on each page, repeated in sequence (there are 5 different colors for the "traditional" section" and 4 for the "electronic" section).

The first 12 issues of Polyglot (i.e., Volume #1 Issues #1 to #12) did not have any images in them other than the Polyglot "traditional" section logos. Starting in Volume #1 Issue #13, images of games, game company logos, and convention photographs have appeared in the newsletter.

There was no "digital" section in Polyglot until Polyglot Volume #1 issue #25. The first computer game press release appeared in the previous issue alongside press releases for "traditional" games. A table of contents first appeared in Volume #1 Issue #25 as well, the first one with clickable internal links was in Volume #2 Issue #4.

Most URLs in Polyglot press releases were clickable. Many of the items that appear in the newsletter have contact information for the game company or the publicist who issued the press release. Often (but not always), the writers are attributed.

As of November 1, 2007, the largest issue of Polyglot to date was Polyglot Volume #3 Issue #9 at 65 pages.

== Impact ==
Polyglot grew from a 3-page PDF of all text to as large as 65 pages with over 50 press releases and as many as 91 images in Volume #3 Issue #9; the PDF's file size ranges was 5.3 megabytes.

Stephen V Cole of Starfleet Games identified Polyglot as one of the "People Who Will Contact You" in his online book about how to run a game company. He advises game companies to "ask them to tell you the kind of information they want... and give it to them." Cole also stated in his blog that "If you really want to know what's going on in the adventure game industry, you can't do better than" reading Polyglot.

Polymancer Studios encouraged other companies in the game business to adopt professional press release writing techniques such as using the inverted pyramid in a style guide on their web site. A press release by Polymancer Studios in Polyglot Volume #3 Issue #1 indicated that this has had the effect that the company intended.

Polyglot was distributed freely on other game companies' websites.

== Regular contributors ==
Apart from editorials, Polyglot's only "contributors" were companies in the game industry. More than 100 companies sent material to Polyglot since it first went online in March 2005.

Roleplaying game companies that have had material posted in Polyglot include Wizards of the Coast, White Wolf, Mongoose Publishing, Columbia Games, Eden Studios, Paizo Publishing, and a large number of smaller "independent" game companies. Polyglot also regularly has had marketing and publicity material from Mayfair Games (known for Settlers of Catan) and other German game companies. Several miniatures companies also send to Polyglot (usually including color photos of their products) including Games Workshop and Rackham Miniatures. Traditional wargame companies like Amarillo Design Bureau and Avalanche Press also have sent product announcements on a regular basis. Some toy companies (e.g. Briarpatch), conventions (e.g. Gen Con), game industry professional associations (e.g. GAMA, and film festivals (e.g. Fantasia) have also had marketing material appear in Polyglot's "Traditional" gaming section.

The various computer games that have been featured in Polyglot include Activision, id Software, Electronic Arts, MTV (who have a game studio), Ubisoft, and numerous smaller companies. Activision was the most frequent contributor, generally having several press releases, product announcements, and pages of screenshots or video stills placed in every issue of Polyglot.
