= Telnarian Histories =

- The Chieftain; The Captain; The King; The Usurper; The Emperor
- Author: John Norman
- Cover artist: Dorian Vallejo (only for the first three novels)
- Country: United States of America
- Language: English
- Genre: Science fantasy
- Publisher: Warner Books
- Published: 1991–2019
- Media type: Print (paperback)

The Telnarian Histories are a series of five space opera novels by American writer John Norman; the first three were published between 1991 and 1993.

The setting of the novels is a galactic realm closely parallel to the later history of the Roman Empire and its wars with Germanic barbarians. The ruling family of the empire is human, but extraterrestrials exist, while individuals pursue destinies of freedom and slavery. The depiction of slavery in the books resembles that found in the Gor series, with female slaves dominated by male masters.

== Books ==
The individual books in the series are:

- The Chieftain (1991)
- The Captain (1992)
- The King (1993)
- The Usurper (2015)
- The Emperor (2019)

== Reception ==
Many fans of Norman's Gor novel series didn't like the Telnarian books as much. One novel concept explored in the second and third books of the series is that of Dira, the goddess of love and beauty in the pantheon of the Telnarian Empire, is also the goddess of slave girls and is herself enslaved among the gods.
