= Time Slave =

Book by John Norman

- First edition
- Author: John Norman
- Cover artist: Gino D'Achille
- Language: English
- Genre: Historical fiction, science fiction
- Publisher: DAW Books
- Publication date: 1975
- Publication place: United States
- Media type: Print (paperback)
- Pages: 380
- ISBN: 978-0-7592-9778-4
- OCLC: 1942479

Time Slave is a 1975 hybrid of historical fiction and science fiction by John Norman. In this book, Norman presents his personal theories of human evolution, exemplified by the case of a modern 20th century woman sent back in time 50,000 years or more; he mourns the loss of human evolutionary fitness and distortion of "natural" social relations which, in his view, occurred when farming spread and farmers squeezed hunter/gatherers to the ecological margins. Time Slave features Norman's social philosophy of male-dominance (as also in his Gor series), and expresses an unexplained connection between female sexual subordination and the speeding up of the development of space travel.
