= Spirit Dance (disambiguation) =

The Spirit Dance is one of the dances of the Waashat religion, a native religion in the Pacific Northwest of North America.

Spirit Dance may also refer to:

== Religion ==
- Mountain Spirit Dance, a traditional dance of the Yavapai, a North American native tribe
- A spirit dance of the Apache, a North American native tribe
- Faun phii ("spirit dance" or "ghost dance"), a Thai religious ceremony honoring ancestral spirits
- Jagar, a Hindu religious ceremony invoking ancestral spirits in Uttarakhand, India.

== Music ==
=== Albums ===
- Spirit Dance (Michael White album), 1972
- Spirit Dance, the debut album by Nitin Sawhney
- Spirit Dance, the debut album by Animus
- Spirit Dance, a 1997 album by Peter Buffett
- Spirit Dance, a 2010 album by David Braid and Canadian Brass

=== Songs ===
- "Yulunga (Spirit Dance)", a song Dead Can Dance on their 1993 album Into the Labyrinth
- 魂之舞 "Spirit Dance", a song by Twelve Girls Band on their debut album Meili Yinyuehui

== See also ==
- Ghost Dance (disambiguation)
- American Spirit Dance Company, a dance company in association with Oklahoma City University
- Spirit Dance Entertainment, a former American film production company by Forest Whitaker
- Spirit Dance Team, a club at the McFarland High School in Wisconsin
- Spirit Dancer, a 2002 album by BlackHawk
