= Gor =

Setting of John Norman's novels

- First published in 1966, Tarnsman of Gor is shown here with 1976 artwork by Boris Vallejo.
- Author: John Norman
- Country: United States
- Language: English
- Genre: Sword and planet, science fantasy
- Publisher: Del Rey
- Published: 1966–1988; 2001–present
- Media type: Print (paperback)
- No. of books: 38

Gor (/ˈɡɔːr/) is the fictional setting for a series of sword and planet novels written by philosophy professor John Lange, writing as John Norman. The setting was first described in the 1966 novel Tarnsman of Gor. The series is inspired by science fantasy pulp fiction works by Edgar Rice Burroughs, such as the Barsoom series. It also includes erotica and philosophical content. The Gor series repeatedly depicts men abducting and physically and sexually brutalizing women, who grow to enjoy their submissive state. According to The Encyclopedia of Science Fiction, Norman's "sexual philosophy" is "widely detested", but the books have inspired a Gorean subculture.

The series has been variously referred to by publishers with several names, including The Chronicles of Counter-Earth (Ballantine Books), The Saga of Tarl Cabot (DAW Books), Gorean Cycle (Tandem Books), Gorean Chronicles (Masquerade Books), Gorean Saga (Open Road Media) and The Counter-Earth Saga (DAW Books, for novels with a protagonist other than Tarl Cabot).

== Background ==
Simplified map of known Gor

In an interview with the speculative fiction anthology Polygraff, John Norman spoke at length about the creation of the Gor universe and his influences.

The Counter-Earth, or Antichthon, is from Greek cosmology. Speculation on such a world, you see, is ancient. One of the premises of the Gorean series is that a race of aliens, whom we might speak of as the Priest-Kings, have a technology at their disposal compared to which ours would be something like that in the Bronze Age.

I think, pretty clearly, the three major influences on my work are Homer, Freud, and Nietzsche. Interestingly, however obvious this influence might be, few, if any, critics, commentators, or such, have called attention to it.

In the same interview, he said "one of the pleasures of writing science fiction is the development of, and characterization of, alien life forms".

== Setting ==
Gor is described as a habitable planet in the Solar System that shares the same orbit as Earth, but it is linearly opposed to Earth and consequently always hidden by the Sun, making direct observation of it from Earth impossible. The flora, fauna and customs of Gor are intricately detailed. Norman populates his planet with the equivalents of Roman, Greek, Native American, Viking, Inuit and other cultures. In the novels, these various population groups are transplants from Earth brought there by spacecraft through the behind-the-scenes rulers of Gor, the Priest-Kings, an extraterrestrial species of insectoid appearance. The Gorean humans are permitted advanced architectural, agricultural and medical skills (including life extension), but are forced to remain primitive in the fields of transportation, communication and weaponry (at approximately the level of Classical Mediterranean civilization) due to restrictions on technology imposed by the Priest-Kings. The most advanced form of transportation is the riding of large predatory birds called tarns by masterful men known as tarnsmen. The limitation of technology is imposed to ensure the safety of both the Priest-Kings and the other indigenous and transplanted beings on Gor, who would otherwise possibly come to harm due to the humans' belligerent tendencies.

The planet Gor has lower gravity than the Earth (which allows for the existence of large flying creatures and tall towers connected by aerial bridges in the cities) and would have an even lower gravity if not for the technology of the Priest-Kings. The known geography of Gor consists mainly of the western seaboard of a continent that runs from the Arctic in the north to south of the equator, with the Thassa ocean to the west, and the Voltai mountain range forming an eastern boundary at many latitudes. There are also offshore islands in the ocean and some relatively sparsely settled plains to the east of the Voltai. The word "Gor" itself means "home stone" in the Gorean language, the native language of the "northern civilized cities of known Gor" (which resemble ancient Greco-Roman city-states in many respects), and a widely spoken lingua franca in many other areas.

The Gorean Kajira "kef" symbol

== Plotlines ==
Most of the novels in the series are action and sexual adventures, with many of the military engagements borrowing liberally from historic ones, such as the trireme battles of ancient Greece and the castle sieges of medieval Europe. Ar, the largest city in known Gor, has resemblances to the ancient city of Rome, and its land empire is opposed by the sea-power of the island of Cos.

The series is an example of planetary romance with the first book, Tarnsman of Gor, opening with scenes reminiscent of scenes in the first book of the Barsoom series by Edgar Rice Burroughs; both feature the protagonist narrating his adventures after being transported to another world. These parallels end after the first few books, when the stories of the books begin to be structured along a loose story arc involving the struggles of the city-state of Ar and the island of Cos to control the Vosk river area, as well as the struggles at a higher level between the non-human Priest-Kings and the Kurii (another alien race) to control Gor and Earth.

Personal flag of Bosk of Port Kar (a.k.a. Tarl Cabot of Bristol), the main narrator of the Gor books

Most of the books are narrated by transplanted British professor Tarl Cabot, master swordsman, as he engages in adventures involving Priest-Kings, Kurii, and humans. Books 7, 11, 19, 22, 26, 27, 31, 34 and parts of 32 are narrated by abducted Earth women who are made into slaves. Books 14, 15, and 16 are narrated by male abductee Jason Marshall. Book 28 is narrated by an unknown Kur, but features Tarl Cabot. Book 30 and parts of 32 are narrated by three Gorean men: a mariner, a scribe and a merchant/slaver.

The series features several sentient alien races. The most important to the books are the insectoid Priest-Kings and the huge, sharp-clawed, predatory Kurii, both spacefarers from foreign star systems. The Priest-Kings rule Gor as disinterested custodians, leaving humans to their own affairs as long as they abide by certain restrictions on technology. The Kurii are an aggressive, invasive race with advanced technology (but less so than that of the Priest-Kings) who wish to colonize both Gor and Earth. The power of the Priest-Kings is diminished after the "Nest War" described in the third book and the Priest-Kings and Kurii struggle against each other via their respective human agents and spies.

Early entries in the series were plot-driven space opera adventures, but later entries grew more philosophical and sexual. Many subplots run the course of several books and tie back to the main plot in later books. Some of these plots begin in the first book, but most are underway in the first 10 books.

== Publication ==
DAW Books, which published the Gor series from the 8th volume (Hunters of Gor) to the 25th volume (Magicians of Gor), subsequently decided to cease publication of the books, citing low sales;

According to Betsy Wollheim, who took over DAW Books from her father Donald A. Wollheim in 1985,

I alone killed the Gor books. I am personally responsible for rejecting John Norman. ... I am very proud of that. We needed him in the beginning because he sold so well. And in the beginning he didn't write quite as much about female slavery. He was more Burroughs-like. But he got worse and worse and worse and it got to the point where it was demeaning our company to publish them. ... But when I rejected John Norman, he wrote a twenty-page letter to the head of Waldenbooks accusing me of censorship, which was pretty hilarious. The head of New American Library came up to me and said "Why aren't you publishing him?" I said, "Hey, he's yours. Go. Do it. You want to publish him, publish him." If you accuse a publisher of censorship every time they reject a manuscript, then by that definition every manuscript submitted would have to be published. Books would be terrible. A publisher has to have some sort of editorial discretion.

Norman attributed the decision to feminist influences, saying in 1996:

Tarnsman of Gor was published in late 1966. It has been reprinted 22 times... I have recently signed contracts for fresh French and German sales, and have recently been published for the first time in Czechoslovakia. There have been recent Spanish and Italian sales. There's no evidence that my books no longer sell... After DAW refused to buy any more Gor books, I sold a three-part Telnarian series to Brian Thomsen of Warner Books. The first book, The Chieftain, had a 67 percent sell-through. The second, The Captain, had a 91 percent sell-through, which is the sort of thing that would make Stephen King rush over to shake your hand... Brian Thomsen, my Warner editor for the Telnarian series... was replaced by an editor from one of the blacklisting presses, one that explicitly informed my agent they would not consider anything by John Norman. That new editor canceled the series despite its success and without waiting to see how the third book, The King, would do. That way things are made nicely clear...

Unfortunately for me, only about seven or eight publishing houses maintain a mass-market paperback line in science fiction and fantasy; this small, closely-knit group effectively controls the market. With such a group, a blacklist need not be an explicit, formal written or oral agreement subscribed to by a gathered cabal pledged to secrecy. It is an understanding that a certain individual is to be ostracized, excluded, methodologically overlooked or such.

Starting in 2001, John Norman's books were published by E-Reads as ebooks and print copies. According to their website, "they are among E-Reads' biggest sellers". Open Road Integrated Media acquired E-Reads in 2014.

== List of volumes ==
#	Title	Year	Narrator(s)	Publisher	ISBN
1	Tarnsman of Gor	1966	Tarl Cabot	Ballantine Books	ISBN 0-345-27583-7
2	Outlaw of Gor	1967	Tarl Cabot	Ballantine Books	ISBN 0-345-27136-X
3	Priest-Kings of Gor	1968	Tarl Cabot	Ballantine Books	ISBN 0-7592-0036-X
4	Nomads of Gor	1969	Tarl Cabot	Ballantine Books	ISBN 0-7592-5445-1
5	Assassin of Gor	1970	Tarl Cabot	Ballantine Books	ISBN 0-7592-0091-2
6	Raiders of Gor	1971	Tarl Cabot	Ballantine Books	ISBN 0-7592-0153-6
7	Captive of Gor	1972	Elinor Brinton	DAW Books	ISBN 0-7592-0105-6
8	Hunters of Gor	1974	Tarl Cabot	DAW Books	ISBN 0-7592-0130-7
9	Marauders of Gor	1975	Tarl Cabot	DAW Books	ISBN 0-7592-0141-2
10	Tribesmen of Gor	1976	Tarl Cabot	DAW Books	ISBN 0-7592-5446-X
11	Slave Girl of Gor	1977	Judy Thornton	DAW Books	ISBN 0-7592-0454-3
12	Beasts of Gor	1978	Tarl Cabot	DAW Books	ISBN 0-7592-1125-6
13	Explorers of Gor	1979	Tarl Cabot	DAW Books	ISBN 0-7592-1167-1
14	Fighting Slave of Gor	1980	Jason Marshall	DAW Books	ISBN 0-7592-1173-6
15	Rogue of Gor	1981	Jason Marshall	DAW Books	ISBN 0-7592-1179-5
16	Guardsman of Gor	1981	Jason Marshall	DAW Books	ISBN 0-7592-1368-2
17	Savages of Gor	1982	Tarl Cabot	DAW Books	ISBN 0-7592-1374-7
18	Blood Brothers of Gor	1982	Tarl Cabot	DAW Books	ISBN 0-7592-1380-1
19	Kajira of Gor	1983	Tiffany Collins	DAW Books	ISBN 0-7592-1926-5
20	Players of Gor	1984	Tarl Cabot	DAW Books	ISBN 0-7592-1932-X
21	Mercenaries of Gor	1985	Tarl Cabot	DAW Books	ISBN 0-7592-1944-3
22	Dancer of Gor	1985	Doreen Williamson	DAW Books	ISBN 0-7592-1950-8
23	Renegades of Gor	1986	Tarl Cabot	DAW Books	ISBN 0-7592-1956-7
24	Vagabonds of Gor	1987	Tarl Cabot	DAW Books	ISBN 0-7592-1980-X
25	Magicians of Gor	1988	Tarl Cabot	DAW Books	ISBN 0-7592-1986-9
26	Witness of Gor	2001	Janice	E-Reads	ISBN 0-7592-4235-6
27	Prize of Gor	2008	Ellen	E-Reads	ISBN 0-7592-4580-0
28	Kur of Gor	2009	An unnamed Kur	E-Reads	ISBN 0-7592-9782-7
29	Swordsmen of Gor	2010	Tarl Cabot	E-Reads	ISBN 1-6175-6040-5
30	Mariners of Gor	2011	A mariner	E-Reads	ISBN 0-7592-9989-7
31	Conspirators of Gor	2012	Allison Ashton-Baker	E-Reads	ISBN 1-6175-6731-0
32	Smugglers of Gor	2012	Margaret Alyssa Cameron, a scribe, and a merchant/slaver	E-Reads	ISBN 1-6175-6865-1
33	Rebels of Gor	2013	Tarl Cabot	E-Reads	ISBN 1-6175-6123-1
34	Plunder of Gor	2016	Phyllis	Open Road	ISBN 1-5040-3406-6
35	Quarry of Gor	2019	Margaret Henderson	Open Road	ISBN 1-5040-5831-3
36	Avengers of Gor	2021	Tarl Cabot	Open Road	ISBN 1-5040-6714-2
37	Warriors of Gor	2022	Tarl Cabot	Open Road	ISBN 1-5040-7672-9
38	Treasure of Gor	2024	Agnes Morrison Atherton	Open Road	ISBN 1-5040-8949-9

== Adaptations ==
Two films have been made, Gor in 1987 and Outlaw of Gor in 1989 (also known as Outlaw).

While not officially connected to John Norman's work, Fencer of Minerva is a Japanese animated series containing many of the elements and ideas discussed in Gorean philosophy.

During the mid-1990s, an attempt was made to publish an authorized graphic novel adaptation of the Gor series under Vision Entertainment. The project collapsed under a combination of financial issues and the nature of the imagery, which violated Canadian law, where the printer was located.

A Gor region was established in the virtual world of Second Life in 2005, where users roleplay as characters based on the novels. In it, characters interact in standard Middle Age scenarios, combat, and sexual situations. By mid-2024, many more regions had been added, and there is a body of fans who continue to roleplay in the Gorean settings.

The Gor novels have inspired short fan fiction parodies freely available online, including "Houseplants of Gor" and "Gay, Bejeweled, Nazi Bikers of Gor".

== Reception ==
The Gor novels have been criticized for their focus on relationships between dominant men and submissive women, the latter often in positions of slavery. The Encyclopedia of Fantasy has stated that the first several books are "passable exercises" of Edgar Rice Burroughs-style fiction while "later volumes degenerate into extremely sexist, sadomasochistic pornography involving the ritual humiliation of women, and as a result have caused widespread offence". Science fiction/fantasy author Michael Moorcock has suggested that the Gor novels should be placed on the top shelves of bookstores, saying, "I'm not for censorship but I am for strategies which marginalize stuff that works to objectify women and suggests women enjoy being beaten."

== Subculture ==
A fandom has developed based on the series. Gorean subculture developed independently of Norman's involvement, particularly starting as a fan network after the publishing houses ceased printing new paperback editions of the novels. Fans allege that due to the controversy and pressure from feminist circles, the Gor books went out of print in the late 1980s (trade paperback and e-book sequel novels were subsequently published from 2001 to 2016). It does not have a uniform following but encompasses different groups of varying views and practices.

The Gorean subculture particularly focuses on the master-and-slave dynamic in sexual relationships and associated forms of female submission as portrayed in the novels. Therefore, although they are estimated to comprise less than 5% of the total female population on Gor, training and keeping a female slave (often known as a kajira) is central to Gorean subculture. Formal slave training, slave positions, and commands, as well as slave attire and beautification, are practices central to the Gorean subculture.

Literalists, otherwise known as lifestylers, incorporate elements from the Gorean culture and gender roles in their daily lives and some followers of an unofficial splinter group known as Kaotians who adhered to this approach were prosecuted for leading coercive sex cults. As opposed to literalists, the role players, divided into real-life sexual roleplayers (engaged or not engaged in BDSM practices) and online role-playing gamers (present particularly in Second Life) are not necessarily committed to Gorean philosophy and ideals.

Starting from the 1990s, the Gorean subculture has become attractive to a number of male teenagers through role-playing in chat rooms. The teenage role-playing Goreans who concealed many of their personal aspects such as age or lack of experience, thanks to anonymity, managed to appeal to a considerable number of married and middle-aged women as kajirae in role-playing contexts. Such notoriety caused by this profile and related practices in the virtual Gorean community succeeded in creating disdain among both feminists and the BDSM community. Nevertheless, scholars have discussed the way that Gorean subculture groups on media such as Second Life and Internet Relay Chat have influenced the development of online role-playing and even the MMORPG genre.

Norman's non-fictional sex manual Imaginative Sex presents a series of elaborate fantasy scenarios to be acted out in isolated scenes. He also recommends the use of symbolic substitutes, such as the sound of claps as a substitute for whippings and other physical punishments. Patrick Califia asserts that Norman was critical of the psychological and physical harm that non-stop BDSM slavery and corporal punishment might inflict. However, such views of Norman are not part of the Gorean canon and debate on Gorean practices' relationship to BDSM, focusing on aspects such as Total Power Exchange and further complicated by the community's diverse nature, continue. BDSM writer Michael Makai nevertheless asserts that Gorean fiction may be found responsible for shaping or otherwise popularizing many of today's established BDSM protocols and tenets.

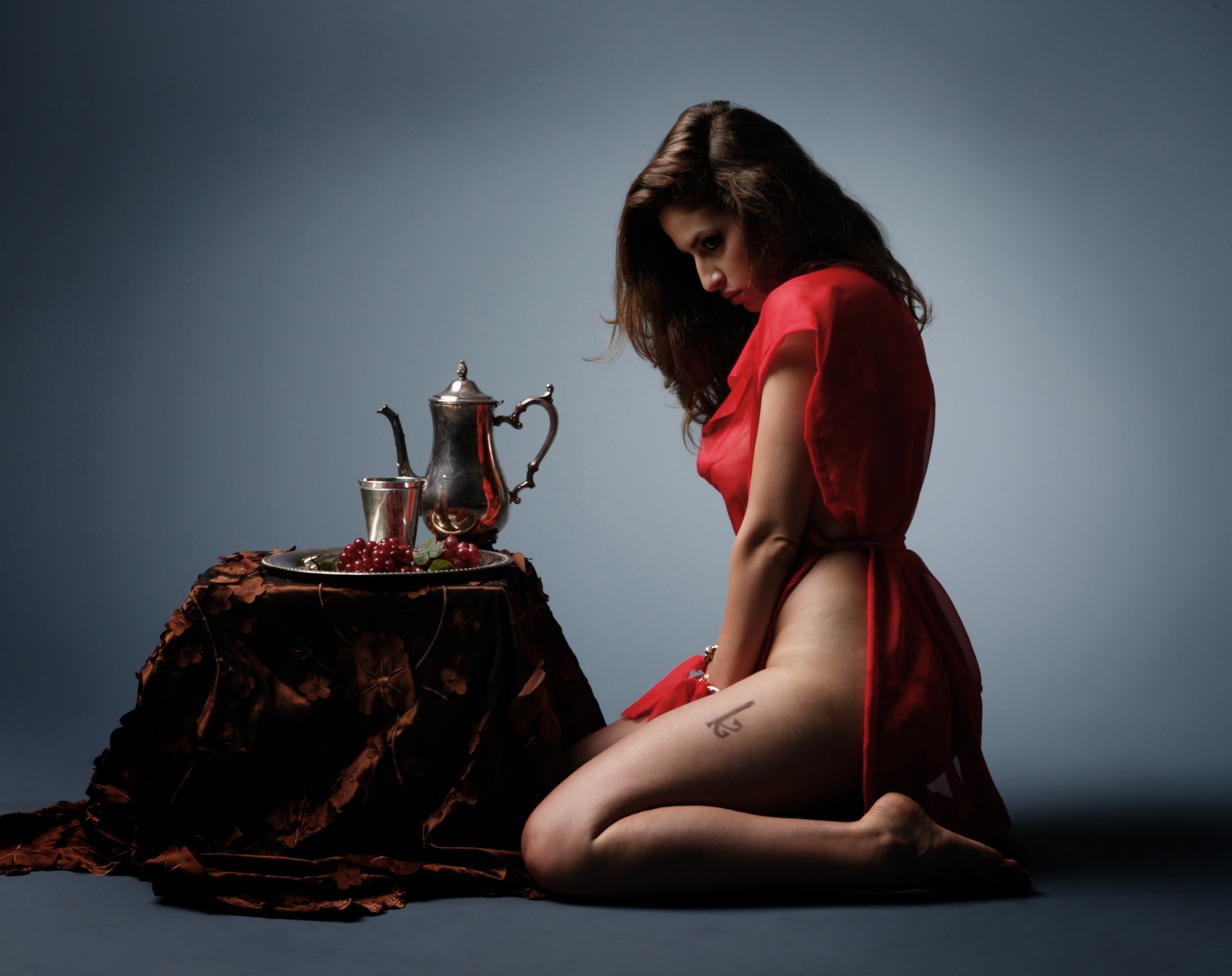
Model dressed as a kajira in a camisk with a simulated kef brand

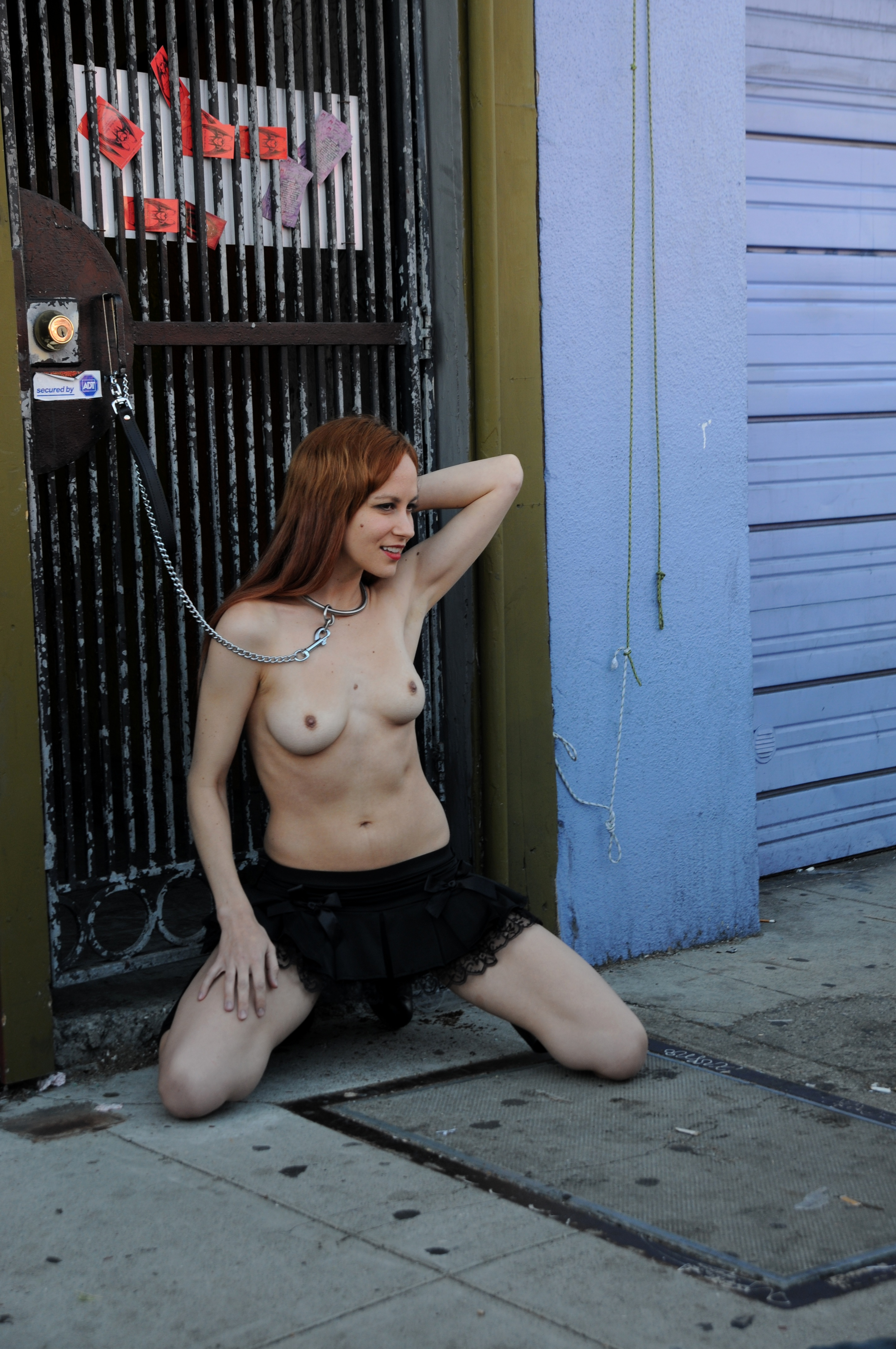
Sexual roleplayer in a kajira pose at Folsom Street Fair. The woman is posing in an approximation to nadu, the typical position of a "pleasure slave".

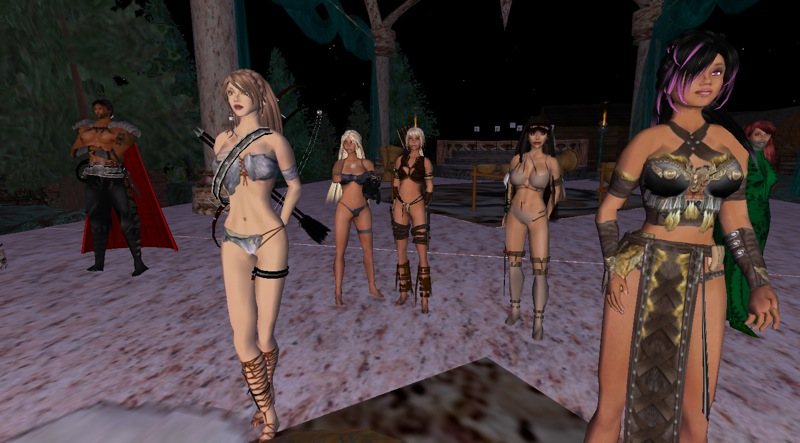
Gorean role-playing in Second Life. Panther Girls (Gorean quasi-Amazons) from the Northern Forest, attending a meeting at the town hall of the city Thentis.

== See also ==
- BDSM in culture and media – Stories, books and media about bondage
- Dominance and submission – Erotic roleplay involving the submission of one person to another
- Imaginative Sex – 1974 non-fiction book by John Norman
- Master/slave (BDSM) – Consensual authority-exchange structured sexual relationship
- Sex slave – Slavery with the intention of using the slaves for sex
- Story of O – 1954 erotic novel by Anne Desclos
- Telnarian Histories
- Time Slave – Book by John Norman
