= John Norman =

American professor and writer

- Born: John Frederick Lange Jr. June 3, 1931 (age 95); Chicago, Illinois, U.S.
- Education: Bachelor of Arts; Master of Arts; Doctor of Philosophy
- Alma mater: University of Nebraska; University of Southern California; Princeton University
- Occupations: Professor of philosophy, writer
- Spouse: Bernice L. Green (m. 1956)
- Children: 3
- Writing career
- Genres: Science fantasy Sword and planet
- Notable work: Gor novel series

John Frederick Lange Jr. (born June 3, 1931) is an American writer who, as John Norman, has authored the Gor series of science fantasy novels. Norman was also a philosophy professor.

== Early life and education ==
Lange was born in Chicago, Illinois, to John Frederick Lange and Almyra D. Lange (née Taylor).

He began his academic career in the early 1950s, earning a Bachelor of Arts degree from the University of Nebraska in 1953, and his Master of Arts degree from the University of Southern California in 1957.

== Personal life ==
Lange married Bernice L. Green on January 14, 1956, while he was still a student at USC. The couple have three children: John, David, and Jennifer.

== Academic career ==
Lange earned his PhD in 1963 from Princeton University. His dissertation was named: "In defence of ethical naturalism: an examination of certain aspects of naturalistic fallacy, with particular attention to the logic of an open question argument". Lange summed it up in an interview by saying "if one cannot make sense of morality within some sort of satisfying, natural context, then one is likely to end up with no morality, which is less than societally reassuring, or is likely to end up with a competitive plethora of moralities in which ninety-nine percent of the world's population is convinced that the other ninety-nine percent is unclean, stupid, uninformed, vicious, depraved, in need of coercive correction, and such. That too, seems less than reassuring."

He was a professor at Queens College of the City University of New York before retirement.

== Writing career ==
Norman's fiction attained popularity in the 1970s and early 1980s with an estimated 6 to 12 million copies sold.

John Norman's Gorean Saga is a long-running series of adventure science fantasy novels, starting in December 1966 with Tarnsman of Gor. The series was put on hold after its twenty-fifth installment, Magicians of Gor, in 1988, when DAW refused to publish its successor, Witness of Gor. After several unsuccessful attempts to find a trade publishing outlet, the series was brought back into print in 2001 with the publication of Witness of Gor. Norman has also produced a separate science fiction series, the Telnarian Histories, plus three other fiction works, five non-fiction works, and a collection of thirty short stories.

Norman has said that the three major influences on his work are Homer, Freud, and Nietzsche.

== Themes ==
According to Norman, his Gor books are science fiction or adventure fantasy works which are also "intellectual, philosophical, and psychological novels". His fiction depicts fantastic worlds where male-dominated bondage relationships are natural and widely practiced and respected culturally, whereas characteristics of modern society are criticized and philosophical themes are explored, especially from a Nietzschean view.

Although the bondage in his Imaginative Sex guide is directed to sexual practices, the bondage and slavery presented on "Gor" follows along the lines of societal or legal slavery; a common way of life as reflected in ancient Rome and other societies. While the philosophy presented is unquestionably that of male dominance, male characters are themselves occasionally enslaved by powerful females. In an interview with Polygraff magazine, Norman stated that he believes that it is obvious that all societies are based on dominance and hierarchy.

Despite his books being associated with BDSM, Norman is openly critical of the community. In a 2011 interview with Gizmodo, he stated, "I dissociate myself from BDSM, at least as I understand it. I may, of course, misunderstand it. I wonder if one would settle merely for 'real-life Gorean slavery', because, as I understand it, BDSM is not Gorean. If something is not beautiful, it is not Gorean."

His non-fiction works cover philosophy, ethics and historiography.

=== Gorean subculture ===
A fandom based on his Gor novels, known as the Gorean subculture, has developed without Lange's direct involvement. Scholars have discussed the way that Gorean subculture groups on media such as IMVU, Second Life, and Internet Relay Chat have influenced the development of online role-playing and even the MMORPG genre.

== Works ==
=== Fiction ===
==== Gor series ====
1. Tarnsman of Gor (1966) ISBN 0-345-27583-7
2. Outlaw of Gor (1967) ISBN 0-345-27136-X
3. Priest-Kings of Gor (1968) ISBN 0-7592-0036-X
4. Nomads of Gor (1969) ISBN 0-7592-5445-1
5. Assassin of Gor (1970) ISBN 0-7592-0091-2
6. Raiders of Gor (1971) ISBN 0-7592-0153-6
7. Captive of Gor (1972) ISBN 0-7592-0105-6
8. Hunters of Gor (1974) ISBN 0-7592-0130-7
9. Marauders of Gor (1975) ISBN 0-7592-0141-2
10. Tribesmen of Gor (1976) ISBN 0-7592-5446-X
11. Slave Girl of Gor (1977) ISBN 0-7592-0454-3
12. Beasts of Gor (1978) ISBN 0-7592-1125-6
13. Explorers of Gor (1979) ISBN 0-7592-1167-1
14. Fighting Slave of Gor (1980) ISBN 0-7592-1173-6
15. Rogue of Gor (1981) ISBN 0-7592-1179-5
16. Guardsman of Gor (1981) ISBN 0-7592-1368-2
17. Savages of Gor (1982) ISBN 0-7592-1374-7
18. Blood Brothers of Gor (1982) ISBN 0-7592-1380-1
19. Kajira of Gor (1983) ISBN 0-7592-1926-5
20. Players of Gor (1984) ISBN 0-7592-1932-X
21. Mercenaries of Gor (1985) ISBN 0-7592-1944-3
22. Dancer of Gor (1985) ISBN 0-7592-1950-8
23. Renegades of Gor (1986) ISBN 0-7592-1956-7
24. Vagabonds of Gor (1987) ISBN 0-7592-1980-X
25. Magicians of Gor (1988) ISBN 0-7592-1986-9
26. Witness of Gor (2001) ISBN 0-7592-4235-6
27. Prize of Gor (2008) ISBN 0-7592-4580-0
28. Kur of Gor (2009) ISBN 0-7592-9782-7
29. Swordsmen of Gor (2010) ISBN 1-6175-6040-5
30. Mariners of Gor (2011) ISBN 0-7592-9989-7
31. Conspirators of Gor (2012) ISBN 1-6175-6731-0
32. Smugglers of Gor (Oct. 2012) ISBN 1-6175-6865-1
33. Rebels of Gor (Oct. 2013) ISBN 1-6175-6123-1
34. Plunder of Gor (August 2016) ISBN 1-5040-3406-6
35. Quarry of Gor (June 2019) ISBN 1-5040-5832-1
36. Avengers of Gor (May 25, 2021), Open Road Distribution, ISBN 1-5040-6714-2
37. Warriors of Gor (Aug 30, 2022), Open Road Distribution, ISBN 1-5040-7672-9
38. Treasure of Gor (April 23, 2024), Open Road Distribution, ISBN 1-5040-8949-9

==== Telnarian Histories series ====
1. The Chieftain (1991) ISBN 1-58586-717-9
2. The Captain (1992) ISBN 1-58586-721-7
3. The King (1993) ISBN 1-58586-725-X
4. The Usurper (2015) ISBN 978-1497679269
5. The Emperor (May 2019) ISBN 1-5040-5816-X

==== Other novels ====
- Ghost Dance (1970) ISBN 0-7592-9774-6
- Time Slave (1975) ISBN 0-7592-9778-9
- The Totems of Abydos (2012) ISBN 978-1-6175-6476-5

==== Short-story collections ====
- Norman Invasions (2009) ISBN 0-7592-9577-8

=== Nonfiction ===
- Values and Imperatives: Studies in Ethics. (1969) [as John Lange, ed.; written by C. I. Lewis] ISBN 0-8047-0687-5
- The Cognitivity Paradox: An Inquiry Concerning the Claims of Philosophy (1970) [as John Lange] ISBN 0-691-07159-4
- Imaginative Sex (1974) ISBN 0-7592-1728-9
- The Philosophy of Historiography (2010) [as John Lange] ISBN 1-61756-130-4
- Philosophy and the Challenge of the Future (2012) [as John Lange] ISBN 1-61756-733-7
