= 1977 in games =

This page lists board and card games, wargames, miniatures games, and table-top tabletop role-playing games published in 1977. For video games, see 1977 in video gaming.

== Games released or invented in 1977 ==
- After the Holocaust
- Air Assault on Crete
- Air War
- Alpha Omega
- Arab-Israeli Wars
- Arduin (role-playing game)
- BattleFleet Mars
- Chitin: I
- Chivalry & Sorcery (role-playing game)
- CirKis
- Cosmic Encounter
- Down Styphon!
- Elric: Battle at the End of Time
- The Emerald Tablet
- Entropy
- Gondor: The Siege of Minas Tirith
- Hexagony
- Highway to the Reich
- Imperium
- Lords & Wizards
- Lords of Valetia
- Machiavelli
- Melee
- Middle Earth
- Nomad Gods
- Obsession
- Ogre
- Pente
- Professional Wrestling (role-playing game)
- Quazar
- Rail Baron
- Rivets
- Rummikub
- Sauron
- Skirrid
- Snit's Revenge
- Space Marines
- Space Quest (role-playing game)
- Squad Leader
- Star Empires
- StarSoldier
- Starwars
- Traveller (role-playing game)
- Victory in the Pacific
- War of the Ring
- The Warlord Game
- WarpWar

== Significant game-related events in 1977 ==
- Playboy Enterprises, Inc. published the first issue of Games magazine.
- Games Workshop published the first issue of White Dwarf magazine.

== Deaths ==
Date	Name	Age	Notability	Ref
November 10	Dennis Wheatley	80	Writer who also designed board games	

== See also ==
- 1977 in video gaming
