= Sauron (disambiguation) =

Sauron is a fictional character from J.R.R. Tolkien's Middle-earth fantasy writings, and the title of one of the three games in the board game Middle Earth based on the character.

Sauron may also refer to:

== Fiction ==
- Sauron (Marvel Comics), a character in the Marvel Comics universe
- Dictator Sauron, a character in the game Steel Empire
- Sauron, a Tyrannosaurus character in the game Primal Rage
- Sauron, a character in Captain Power and the Soldiers of the Future
- Sauron, a robot from the webcomic Anima: Age of the Robots
- Sauron, a planet in the CoDominium (book series) universe
- Sauron, a planet in the game Escape Velocity (video game)

== Other uses ==
- Sauron (game), a 1977 board wargame
- Sauron (spider), a genus of spiders in the family Linyphiidae
- Wojciech Wąsowicz, known as Sauron, the ex-vocalist from the Polish death metal band Decapitated
- SAURON, an astronomical instrument mounted on the William Herschel Telescope
- Project Sauron, malware

== See also ==
- Eye of Sauron (disambiguation)
- List of things named after J. R. R. Tolkien and his works
- Sur-Ron, electric motorcycle company
