= Warrior of Scorpio =

1973 novel by Kenneth Bulmer

- Cover of first edition
- Author: Kenneth Bulmer
- Cover artist: Tim Kirk
- Language: English
- Series: Dray Prescot series
- Genre: Sword and planet
- Publisher: DAW Books
- Publication date: 1973
- Publication place: United States
- Media type: Print (Paperback)
- ISBN: 0860078310
- Preceded by: The Suns of Scorpio
- Followed by: Swordships of Scorpio

Warrior of Scorpio is a science fiction novel written by Kenneth Bulmer under the pseudonym of Alan Burt Akers. It is the third volume in his extensive Dray Prescot series of sword and planet novels, set on the fictional world of Kregen, a planet of the Antares star system in the constellation of Scorpio. It was first published by DAW Books in 1973.

The Dray Prescot series is made of several cycles of novels, each cycle essentially forming a series within the series. In addition to being the third volume in the series as a whole, Warrior of Scorpio is also the third volume in the Delian Cycle and, like the second volume, is set on the fictional continent of Turismond and the Mediterranean Sea-like Eye of the World.

The 52 completed novels of the Dray Prescot series were written by Bulmer between 1972 and 1997, when a stroke stopped his writing, also the later Dray Prescot books, after 1988, were originally only published in German. The series is in the spirit of Edgar Rice Burroughs John Carter of Mars series.

== Plot summary ==
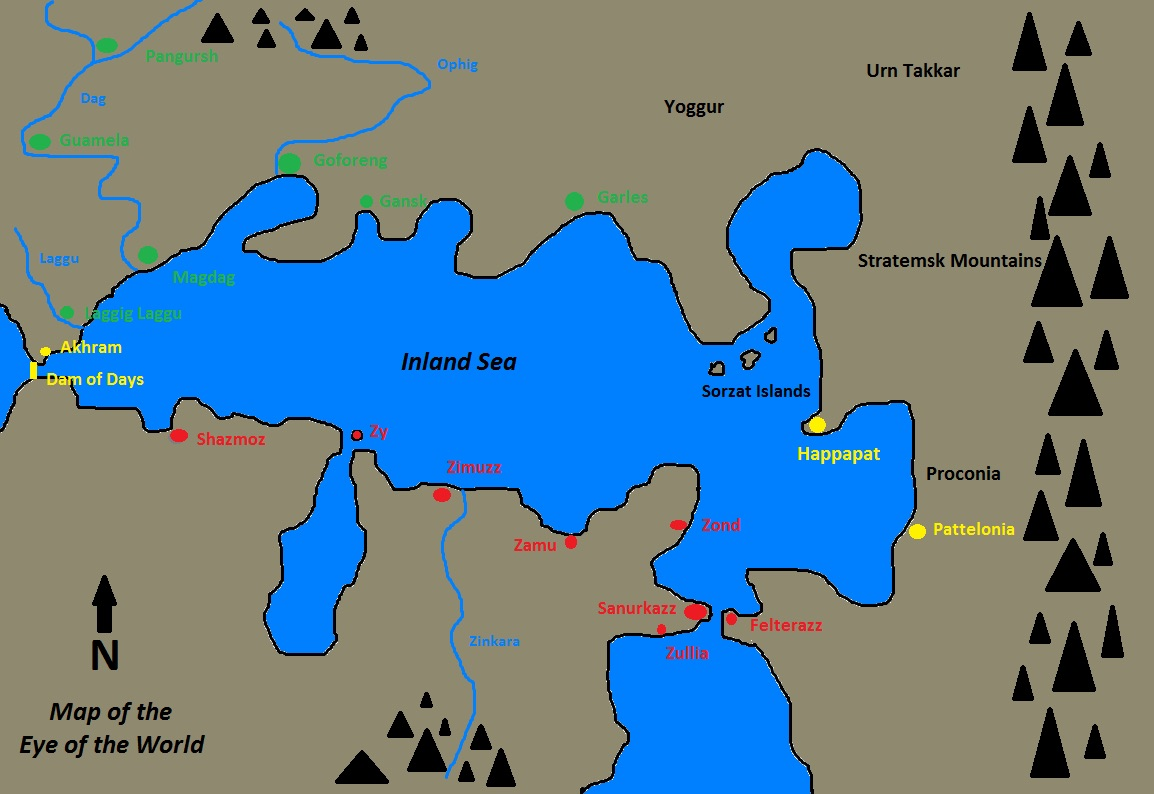
Map of the Eye of the World

The events of the book follow on directly from The Suns of Scorpio when Dray Prescot was taken away in the decisive moment of the slave uprising against the Overlords of Magdag. He resists the feared teleportation back to Earth but finds himself instead in a different location on Kregen. He makes the acquaintance of Seg Segutorio, a bowman from the continent of Loh, thereby beginning a life-long friendship. Seg works at the time as slave at a farm in the region of Proconia, in the east of the Eye of the World. Moments later the farm is attacked by semi-human, lizard-like Sorzart warriors which Prescot takes as the reason for him having been sent there rather than returned to Earth after he, as he presumes, failed to fulfil the Star Lords plans correctly in Magdag. Prescot manages to save the female owner of the farm, her child and Seg from the raiders.

After taking the women and child to safety and being incarcerated Seg and Prescot escape in a small boat. Attempts to head for Sanurkazz are thwarted by sudden storms, making it clear to Prescot that the Star Lords do not wish for him to go there. He learns that Seg was captured and enslaved after fighting for Pattelonia, the chief city of Proconia and ally of Sanurkazz as a mercenary. On the way the two come to a merchant ship from Pattelonia, damaged by storm and attacked by a galley from Magdag. Prescot uses the confusion of the battle to liberate the galley slaves and attack the crew of the galley. Heavily outnumbered the crew is defeated but Prescot learns that the sinking merchant ship has Delia trapped on board. He succeeds in rescuing her and learns that she has been heading for Magdag to find him. Once more he now tries, with Seg, Delia and one of her ladies-in-waiting, Thelda, to head for Sanurkazz but once again a sudden storm forces him eastwards, to Pattelonia.

In Pattelonia, Prescot meets his friend and fellow Kroziar, Pur Zenkiren, who wishes him to lead the army in the east against the forces of Magdag but Prescot explains that he is physically prevented from doing so. Instead, Prescot, Delia, Seg and Thelda head to a secret location where Delia had the flying boat, called a voller, hidden away after she arrived from Vallia in it. The four aim to take the Voller across the mountain range to the east, the Stratemsk, and over the hostile territories beyond to reach Vallia. The traverse the Stratemsk successfully but then crash in the hostile territories and continue on foot. The witness a battle between two of the many city states in the area, remnants of the collapsed empire of Loh and accidentally get involved with Delia being taken captive and carried off by warriors mounted on giant birds.

Because he saved Hwang, the nephew of Queen Lilah of Hiclantung during the battle Prescot and Seg enjoy the hospitality of the queen and recover from their battle wounds in the city. Prescot saves the queen from assassination and is offered to become her companion but declines. He learns that Thelda believes Delia died in the battle and investigates. A spy send by the queen however reveals that Delia may be held captive by Umgar Stro, the barbarian war lord of the Ullars, who have recently entered the region and captured a city. Prescot and Seg set out flying on giant birds, called corths, towards the city of Plicla, held by the Ullars. In the city they rescue one of the fabled Wizards of Loh instead, Lu-si-Yuong, and Prescot reluctantly leaves after learning that Delia was not there. Returning to Hiclantung, Prescot and Seg are forced to rescue Thelda from the queen.

Dray Prescot agrees to march with the queen's army against the Ullars and their allies, the city of Harfnar. The army initially is successful against the Ullars flying army but then is overrun by the land forces of Harfnar. Prescot is taken prisoner and kept in the dungeons of Harfnar. Prescot is finally reunited with Delia when fighting the Ullars and a beast of theirs, the Ullgishoa, in the arena. Prescot prevails, kills Umgar Stro, and escapes with Delia on the formers riding bird. The two are eventually rescued by a flying boat from Vallia, believing Seg and Thelda to be dead.

While having to land for the night with a defect on the voller, Prescot is drugged and left behind, with the situation arranged to look like he has left out of fear of facing Delia's father, the emperor. Prescot was drugged on orders of the Ractors, an influential political party of Vallia, who wanted him dead but his life is spared by Naghan Vanki, spy master of the emperor, who was also on board of the air ship. Observed by both the dove of the Savanti and the Gdoinye of the Star Lords, Prescot decides to head for the east coast of Turismond, to take a ship to Vallia and reunite with Delia.

== Publishing ==
The book was first published in English in August 1973. It was first published in German in 1976 as Der Schwertkämpfer von Scorpio. The book was also published in Italian as Guerriero A Scorpio in 1978. In 2005 the book was published as an E-book by Mushroom Books.

== Book covers ==
The cover of the original US edition was illustrated by Tim Kirk and the second one by Josh Kirby, while the British and first German edition was illustrated by Chris Achilleos and the second German edition was illustrated by Boris Vallejo. The cover of the Italian edition was illustrated by Marco Rostagno.
