= Professional wrestling (disambiguation) =

Professional wrestling is a form of athletic theater performance.

Professional wrestling or pro wrestling may also refer to:

- Pro Wrestling (NES video game), 1986
- Pro Wrestling (Master System video game), 1986
- Pro Wrestling Illustrated, a magazine
- Professional Wrestling (role-playing game), a 1977 game from Off the Wall

== See also ==
- Category:Professional wrestling genres
- Puroresu, professional wrestling in Japan
- Lucha libre, professional wrestling in Mexico
