= Archworld =

Archworld is a system of wargame rules for fantasy and medieval miniatures combat that was published by Fantasy Games Unlimited FGU in 1977.

== Description ==
The combat rules in the original fantasy role-playing game Dungeons & Dragons, published by TSR in 1974, used the traditional wargaming combat system from the previously published Chainmail, which measured movement and distances on a sand table in inches. Later editions made the use of miniatures optional, and assumed most players would make D&D a game of the imagination, where players would simply describe what their player characters were doing. However, by 1977, the use of 25 mm fantasy miniatures was becoming popular. In recognition of that, FGU published a set of combat rules for miniatures using a 1" hex grid rather than sand-table measurements. The early versions of D&D expected heroes would attract bands of henchmen, so the Archworld combat system provides for both single figures as well as figures representing groups of twenty henchmen or soldiers.

The movement system is based on numbers of paces, with one pace equalling 2.5 feet, and one hex equalling 25 feet (ten paces). The book also includes rules for medieval naval combat, and provides details of a fantasy campaign world, with a map of Archworld included.

== Publication history ==
Archworld is a 76-page stapled book with cardstock cover designed by Sheila & Mike Gilbert and published by FGU in 1977. The book includes a fold-out map, three cardstock sheets of naval vessel diagrams, and two cardstock reference cards. Mike Gilbert also did the cover art and interior art.

== Reception ==
Space Gamer noted that Archworld is designed to replace other combat systems that require too much paperwork, and called the interior art "excellent".

In the February 1978 issue of Craft, Model and Hobby Industry, Rick Mataka called Archworld's combat rules "well-written with many examples to aid the reader in understanding the system being employed." Since the system was moderately complex, Mataka thought this would be "More for the intermediate gamer who wants to add additional complexity into his games."
