= Air Assault on Crete =

1977 WWII board game

- Cover art by Rodger B. MacGowan
- Designers: Randall Reed; Vance von Borries
- Illustrators: Rodger B. MacGowan
- Publishers: Avalon Hill
- Publication: 1977
- Genres: WWII

Air Assault on Crete. The extra map for Malta is at the bottom of the picture.

Air Assault on Crete is a wargame published by Avalon Hill in 1977 that simulates the Battle of Crete during World War II.

== Description ==
Air Assault on Crete is a two-player wargame that simulates the German paratroop attack on Crete on May 20, 1941; one player takes on the defense of Crete by Allied forces, and the other player controls the invading German forces. The game provides a series of scenarios designed to simulate the various skirmishes and battles over the ten-day campaign at a company/battalion level. The 3-part 66 in × 8 in (1,680 mm × 200 mm) mapboard uses a hex grid scaled to 1.6 kilometres per hex. Other components include a 24-page rulebook and over 500 die-cut counters.

Each turn, the German player completes five phases, and then the Allied player completes three phases:

- German Play Segment
  - Aircraft Placement & Bombardment Phase
  - Airborne Assault and Air Landing Phase. German paratroops take losses both from scattering as they drop and from enemy fire, consolidated into a single die roll (unlike other games such as Descent on Crete, in which the two processes are shown separately).
  - Sea Movement Phase
  - Movement Phase
  - Combat Phase
- Allied Play Segment
  - Sea Movement Phase
  - Movement Phase
  - Combat Phase

As in reality the Allied forces are deployed to resist an amphibious landing from the north, and in the first turn each unit is only allowed to move a single hex. The Germans need to seize airfields with paratroopers to allow air landing of reinforcements, and also to seize a beach to allow sea landing of heavier supplies. The Germans have only a rough idea of Allied strengths as their counters are initially inverted, concealing their strength. Air rules are abstract.

Players can choose the Basic Game, with simplified rules and victory conditions, or the Advanced Game.

A separate bonus game, Invasion of Malta, 1942, is also included. The game simulates Operation Herkules, a proposed German invasion of Malta that was planned by the German Supreme Command but never initiated. This game has its own counters and a separate 11 in × 16 in (280 mm × 410 mm) mapboard, and uses the same rules system as Air Assault on Crete. As in the main game, defending forces are initially inverted. Only the Northern Beach, far from the German objectives, is easy to land at. Donald Mack in The Wargamer criticised the game for omitting the cliffs which made the Western Beach an unfeasible landing zone in reality.

=== Victory conditions ===
In the Basic Game, if the Germans can seize one airfield and hold it for four turns, then the German player wins the game.

In the Advanced Game, there are several routes to victory:

- If the Germans fail to seize an airfield by Turn 8, then the Allied player wins.
- If the Germans seize an airfield by Turn 8, the Allied player can still win by successfully evacuating combatant and non-combatant units via any of seven designated escape routes on Turn 8 or later (they were evacuated by sea from the south of Crete). If the Allied player has inflicted more than 75 German casualty losses, and has evacuated 80 casualty points in combat units or non-combatants after Turn 8, then the Allied player wins. If both of these conditions are not met, then the German player wins.

== Publication history ==
Air Assault on Crete and its companion game Invasion of Malta were designed by Randall Reed and Vance von Borries and published by Avalon Hill in 1977 as a boxed set with cover art by Rodger B. MacGowan.

== Reception ==
In Issue 32 of the British wargaming magazine Perfidious Albion, Geoff Williams and Peter Bartlam discussed the game. Williams called this "A very good game ... an exciting and desperate struggle for both sides." Williams thought the rules were clear and unambiguous but found issues with the breakdown and rebuild of battalions, and the "too perfect" Allied aircraft. Williams also felt the game should have been broken down into three shorter scenarios. Bartlam replied that the game had been "very enjoyable. The rules are straightforward enough for ease of play but with enough features ... to make it interesting." Bartlam thought the advanced rules made the game very well balanced, but found the basic game favored the German player. Williams concluded, "AAoC is a good game which gives a feeling of the fierce fighting for Crete. I can recommend it to anyone, especially if you have played Arnhem." Bartlam concluded, "It is ... an entertaining game and I hope many prospective buyers are not put off by what I consider to be the worst box-art [Avalon Hill] has come up with."

In the November–December 1978 issue of The Phoenix (Issue 16), Ralph Vickers called Air Assault on Crete "a good game for exercising your skills of simulating your own plans and out-guessing your opponent." While Vickers found most of the rules had "good internal logic", he criticized one rule about evacuation that prevented non-combatant units from leaving their initial sector until Turn 8, saying, "What rationale can make this convincing and realistic?" While Vickers agreed that without this rule, the game "won't hang together", he called the rule "hocus-pocus". Despite this fault, Vickers concluded by giving the game a thumbs up, saying, "this is a game that is going to stay high on the popularity charts for a long time."

In The General, Vance von Borries pointed out that even if the German player is able to capture one or more airfields, the game is far from over if the Allied player can evacuate as quickly as possible. "Although the German player has the unique ability to launch [a] humiliating aerial envelopment, the Commonwealth player can still turn that euphoric and overconfident airborne glory into a bloody fool holding an empty bag. Air Assault on Crete is, in that respect, probably the most satisfying wargame ever developed."

In his 1980 book The Best of Board Wargaming , Nicholas Palmer noted that "The title game is varied and interesting, but it is really upstaged by the beautiful cameo game Invasion of Malta which AH throw into the same box as a bonus!" Although he found that "the simulation is colourful but not terribly convincing", he concluded by giving the game an excellent "excitement" rating of 100%, and a rules clarity rating of 90%, saying, "The intricate victory conditions make for a challenging players' game, ideal for working out subtle defences and assault plans in between games." Palmer agreed with the game's decision to ignore the naval battles, in which Commonwealth ships took heavy losses to German aircraft while trying to disrupt the Axis naval forces, and to focus on the paratroop landings.

In the 1980 book The Complete Book of Wargames, game designer Jon Freeman called the game system "fairly basic and arguably dated [...] It has none of the insight of Simulations Publications' Descent on Crete, but it's a heck of a lot more fun to play." Freeman concluded by giving the game an Overall Evaluation of "Good", saying, "Sophisticated gamers may be somewhat disappointed, but most will enjoy the challenge of planning an invasion — or trying to repel it."

In The Escapist, John Keefer said, "The game does a good job of approximating the troop strengths, drops and reserves from the battle, offering several scenarios set over the course of the 10-day battle."

== Further reviews ==
- Campaign, Issue 85: "Thumbnail Analysis: Air Assault on Crete" (Don Lowry)
- Campaign, Issue 86: "Review, Analysis and Impressions" (John G. Alsen)
- Fire & Movement, Issue 14: "Air Assault on Crete" (A. Doum)
- The Wargamer, Vol. 1, #4: "Briefing: Air Assault on Crete" (Jack Greene)
- Casus Belli #5 (Sept 1981)
