= The Suns of Scorpio =

1973 novel by Kenneth Bulmer

- Cover of first edition
- Author: Kenneth Bulmer
- Cover artist: Tim Kirk
- Language: English
- Series: Dray Prescot series
- Genre: Sword and planet
- Publisher: DAW Books
- Publication date: 1973
- Publication place: United States
- Media type: Print (Paperback)
- ISBN: 0860078159
- Preceded by: Transit to Scorpio
- Followed by: Warrior of Scorpio

The Suns of Scorpio is a science fiction novel written by Kenneth Bulmer under the pseudonym of Alan Burt Akers. It is the second volume in his extensive Dray Prescot series of sword and planet novels, set on the fictional world of Kregen, a planet of the Antares star system in the constellation of Scorpio. It was first published by DAW Books in 1973.

The Dray Prescot series is made of several cycles of novels, each cycle essentially forming a series within the series. In addition to being the second volume in the series as a whole, The Suns of Scorpio is also the second volume in the Delian Cycle and introduces the reader to the fictional continent of Turismond and the Eye of the World.

The 52 completed novels of the Dray Prescot series were written by Bulmer between 1972 and 1997, when a stroke stopped his writing, also the later Dray Prescot books, after 1988, were originally only published in German. The series is in the spirit of Edgar Rice Burroughs John Carter of Mars series.

== Plot summary ==
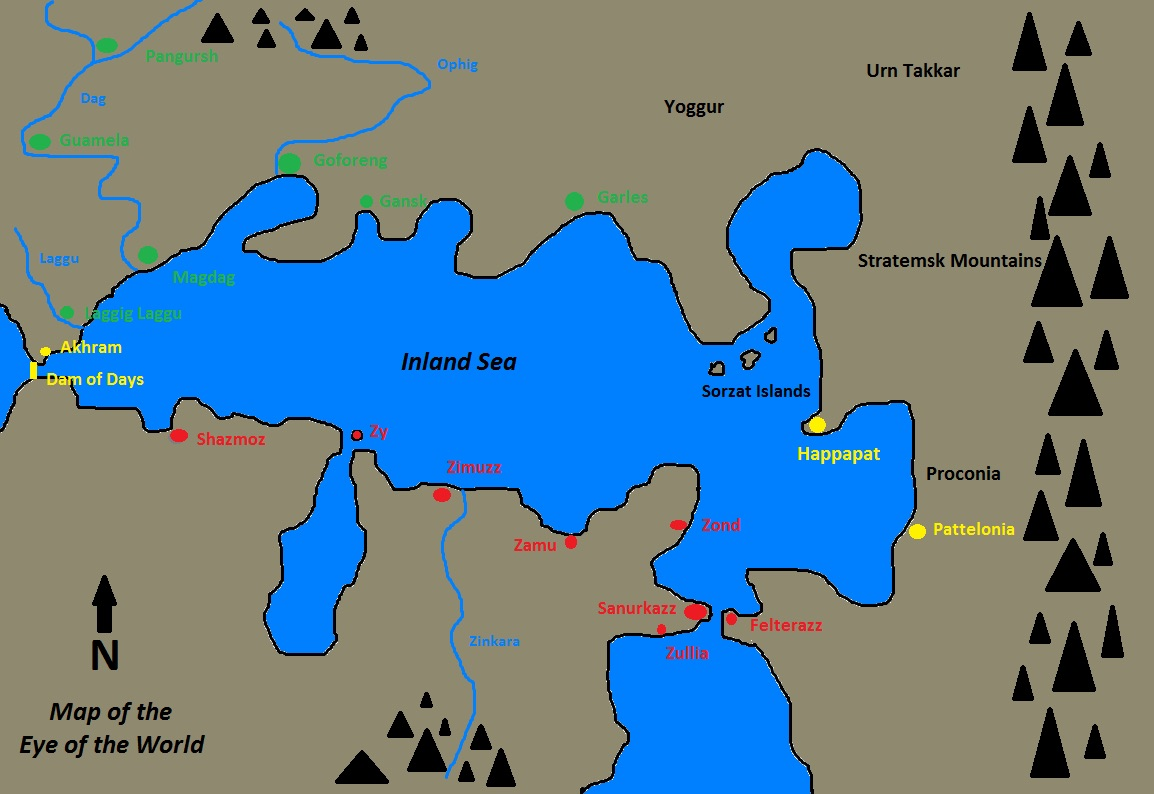
Map of the Eye of the World

The book follows on from the first volume and sees Dray Prescot banished to Earth, arriving in Lisbon. Prescot later takes part in the Battle of Waterloo and eventually travels to India where, shortly after his arrival, he is returned to Kregen through intervention of the Star Lords.

Prescot arrives on Kregen naked and without arms to save a young couple from an attack by rock apes but the two prove ungrateful and leave without thanking him. The significance of this event was later revealed in The Tides of Kregen but unclear to Prescot at the time. He spends the following days with the Todalpheme, an order devoted to calculate the complicated tides of Kregen. He learns that he has been sent to Turismond, a continent to the west of Segesthes, the scene of most of the first book. He finds himself to the far west of this continent at an ancient, possibly man made canal, the only link between the open ocean and a Mediterranean Sea-like inland see, the Eye of the World. The local Todalpheme are trusted with closing the canal in case of a severe storm through an ancient dam at the western end.

Prescot, in fear of banishment back to Earth does not dare search out Delia, who does not make an appearance in the novel, sensing that he was returned to Kregen for a specific purpose, and instead opts to travel along the northern shore of the Eye of the World. He is eventually taken captive, enslaved and taken to Magdag to work as a scribe in the local brickworks. He learned that Magdag is the chief city of the northern shore and dedicated to the God Grodno and Genodras, the green sun of Kregen. The southern shore in turn worships the God Zair and the red sun Zim. The two sides are locked in a long-standing small-scale conflict, with the North defined by an autocratic society ruled by Overlords, employing mostly half-human mercenaries and relying on slaves for labor while the South enjoys a somewhat freer society, which however is also more intolerant of half-humans. Prescot refuses to take part in a slave revolt and is treacherously sent to the galleys as an oar slave, where he meets and befriends a number of southerners. When the galley is attacked by another from the south Prescot breaks free, slows the galley and him and his comrades are rescued. He befriends the ship's captain, Pur Zeniken, a Krozair of Zy, an elite southern fighting order and is taken to Sanurkazz, the holy city of the south.

Dray Prescot rises to become a successful galley captain himself and is eventually chosen to train as a Krozair. After a year of training he is admitted to the order and continues his successful raiding career against the ships from the north. Prescots live is saved in an ambush by two Vallians, Kov Tharu of Vindelka and Vomanus, Delias half brother, unknown to Prescot at the time and send by Delia in search of him. He learns that she has returned to Vallia and send out emissaries in search of Dray Prescot. He takes off to sail to Vallia but the merchant ship he travels on is raided by a galley from Magdag and Prescot is involuntarily taken aboard under the disguise of Drak, Kov of Delphond, Kov being a noble title similar to the Earthly Duke. Prescot spends time with the nobles of Magdag while waiting for a ship to take him to Vallia but also makes contact again with his old slave friends to plot an uprising.

Prescot trains the slaves and designs and builds new weapons for an uprising. He is betrayed by two of his slave friends out of jeliousy over a slave girl and taken captive, identified as a Krozair but escapes with the help of Princess Susheeng, a noble women in love with him. At the time of the Great Death, when the green sun Gendoras is eclipsed by the red sun Zim the slaves rise up. While the Overloards of Magdag dress in red and perform their rituals the slaves rise up and attack, seemingly victorious. But once again, in the moment of triumph, Dray Prescot is taken away by the Star Lords and he learns later that the rebellion collapsed after his disappearance.

== Publishing ==
The book was first published in English in April 1973. It was first published in German in 1976 as Die Sonnen von Scorpio. The book was also published in Italian as I Soli Di Scorpio. In 2005 the book was published as an E-book by Mushroom Books.

== Book covers ==
The cover of the original US edition was illustrated by Tim Kirk and the second one by Josh Kirby, while the British and first German edition was illustrated by Chris Achilleos and the second German edition was illustrated by Boris Vallejo. The cover of the Italian edition was illustrated by Marco Rostagno.
