= Down Styphon! =

Down Styphon! is a miniatures wargame published by Fantasy Games Unlimited in 1977.

== Description ==
The Musket & Pike rules for simulating battles of the 16th and 17th centuries with 15mm miniature soldiers had originally been published in 1973 by Simulations Publications Inc. (SPI). Using modified Musket & Pike rules, Mike Gilbert designed Down Styphon!, a miniatures wargame that is based the battles described in H. Beam Piper's novel Lord Kalvan of Otherwhen.

== Reception ==
In the November-December 1977 edition of The Space Gamer (Issue No. 14), Tony Watson thought the game, although well-written, was just okay, saying, "The rules themselves are good, faithful to their inspiration. They are not very innovative, but they certainly provide all major components thus giving the players some interesting and accurate miniatures battles."

In the October 1979 edition of Dragon (Issue #30), Kenneth Hulme thought that most of the 18-page rule book was "top-notch", but had issues with a number of the rules, which he felt prevented the game from truly bringing Piper's novel to life. However, he concluded with a thumbs up, saying, "Once the purchaser of Down Styphon gets past the initial few bugaboos, however, the game is very playable. With a few modifications, it can be used for any Musket & Pike period battle simulation."
