= Eye of Sauron (disambiguation) =

The Eye of Sauron is the image most often associated with Sauron in The Lord of the Rings by J. R. R. Tolkien.

Eye of Sauron or Sauron's Eye may also refer to:

- M 1-42, "Eye of Sauron" nebula, a planetary nebula with an eye-like appearance, nicknamed due to the similarity with the theatrical eye.
- Helix Nebula, "Eye of Sauron", a planetary nebula with an eye-like appearance also called "The Eye of God"
- HR 4796, "Sauron's Eye", a star system with a bright dust ring whose alignment appears similar to the theatrical eye, and thus nicknamed.
- NGC 4151, "The Eye of Sauron", an intermediate spiral Seyfert galaxy, whose configuration appears similar to the theatrical eye, and thus nicknamed.
- Fomalhaut, 18th-brightest star in Earth's sky, likewise surrounded by a debris ring, with its resulting telescopic appearance causing some to nickname it "Great Eye of Sauron"

== See also ==
- McFarland Carillon#"Eye of Sauron" prank
