= Snit Smashing =

Snit Smashing is a 1977 board game published by TSR, Inc..

== Gameplay ==
Snit Smashing is a game in which players race breeding Snits across a hex‑grid beach while an opposing Bolotomu tries to smash them before they can multiply and win.

== Publication history ==
Snit Smashing was published in Dragon #10. It was later released along with Snit's Revenge as Snits!

== Reception ==
Perfidious Albion felt that "It is easy for two players to gang up on a third and reduce him to the status of an also ran. However, it is virtually impossible to eliminate a player, so one has to be careful of who you annoy. For the price you pay for the magazine, I feel sure that Snit Smashing is well worth it."
