= Imperium (board game) =

1977 Science fiction tabletop wargame

Empires in Conflict – Worlds in the Balance
- First edition box cover by Stephen Fabian, 1977
- Other names: Imperium, 3rd Millennium
- Designers: Marc W. Miller
- Publishers: Conflict Game Company & Game Designers' Workshop; Avalanche Press
- Publication: 1977; 49 years ago
- Genres: Science fiction board wargame

Imperium is a science fiction board wargame designed by Marc W. Miller, and published in 1977 by the Conflict Game Company and Game Designers' Workshop (GDW). It features asymmetrical forces, each of the two sides having its unique set of constraints. The game came in a cardboard box illustrated with a space battle on the exterior. It included a cardboard-mounted, folding map of a local region of the Milky Way galaxy, a set of rules and charts, and the 352 counters representing the various spacecraft, ground units, and markers, and a six-sided die. A second edition was published in 1990, a third in 2001, and the first edition republished in 2004.

== Description ==
Imperium is a two-player game simulating a series of conflicts between the emerging Terran (human) Confederation and an immense and ancient alien empire, the Imperium. The Sun and nearby stars lie at the extreme edge of this alien space-faring civilization, and the Terrans struggle to survive and expand against this powerful state. While the Terran player is in control of the entire Confederation military, the Imperial player represents a low-ranking provincial governor on the frontier, who is forced to petition the central government for reinforcements and is occasionally subject to its meddling.

When Imperium was published in 1977, its scenario was not connected to any other game. GDW published Traveller in the same year, but Traveller was at that point a system for running adventures in a generic science fiction setting, with no established background. However, as the company constructed the Third Imperium as the default setting for Traveller, the situation in Imperium was retconned into the Traveller Imperium's history; it became the First Interstellar War, the first of many wars leading to the overthrow of the Vilani Grand Empire of Stars (Ziru Sirka) by the Terran Confederation and the establishment of the Rule of Man.

The fold-out map depicts a nearby region of the Galaxy that includes important nearby stars as well as hyperspace jump routes between them. This sector forms a single province within the Imperium. The map is printed on a dark background and is overlaid by a hex grid. Each hex represents a half parsec, which would require about 1.8 years to traverse traveling at 90% the speed of light. Along the edges of the map are tracks for marking turns and tallying resources. The map includes a number of commonly known stars, such as Alpha Centauri, Procyon, Sirius, Epsilon Indi, and Altair, as well as a considerable number with more exotic names (mostly taken from the Sumerian language). Only a dozen stars have naturally habitable planets, although many more have planetary systems with outpost-capable worlds.

The game includes a variety of ship types, ranging in size from the small scouts and fighters to the mighty battleships. The ship counters are blue for the Terrans and red for the Imperium. Each counter includes a set of ratings, the ship type, and a silhouette. The combat ratings give the Beam weapon combat factor, the Missile factor, and the Screen factor. Beam weapons are for close range combat, while missiles are best fired at long range or used for planetary bombardment. Beam weapons are slightly more effective, but missiles get to fire first. The screen factor represents the ship's capacity for defense. The following ship types are available for production: Scout ships, destroyers; several different types of cruisers, dreadnaughts, and battleships; stationary monitor defense platforms, missile boats, and "mother ships" (functioning as aircraft carriers) with their fighter squadrons; transport and tanker ships. Ships with a black silhouette can perform a jump between stars, while ships with a white silhouette can only travel through regular space.

The two sides' ships are not mirror images. The Terrans generally have stronger ships overall and have the upper hand on beam weapons, while the Imperium favors missiles. Smaller Terran ships focus on beam weapons while smaller Imperial ships are more balanced. On the other hand, larger Terran ships are balanced while most large Imperial ships feature stronger missile ratings. But there are exceptions - both sides can build Strike Cruisers with high missile factors, and each side has at least one unique ship type not available to the opposing side: the Terrans can build cheaper Missile Boats, while the Imperium can build heavy Attack Cruisers.

The available jump routes can significantly hinder the movement of a side's forces. Certain star systems act as bottle-necks, and can be used by each side as a defensive front. Two of the stars do not allow refueling, so tankers are required to leave these sites. Ships (excepting fighters and missile boats) are allowed to move at sub-light speeds across the hex map, and so can move directly from star to star without following the jump routes. However the movement rate of these ships is only one hex per turn.

== Publication history ==
Imperium was designed by Marc W. Miller, developed by Frank Chadwick and John Harshman, and published in 1977 by the Conflict Game Company and GDW.

Marc Miller states that the playing of Phil Pritchard's game Lensman "well into many late nights inspired the Game Designers' Workshop staff to come up with a similarly star-spanning strategic interstellar wargame titled Imperium; that Imperium was never published, but was ultimately transformed into a simpler game with the same name: Imperium, Empires in Conflict/Worlds in the Balance."

GDW published a second edition with minor differences in 1990.

A third edition, Imperium, 3rd Millennium, was published in 2001 by Avalanche Press. This new release had new graphics and changed rules. The game was nominated for four Origins Awards in 2002.

The original game was republished in 2004 as part of Far Future Enterprises Traveller: The Classic Games, Games 1-6+.

== Game play ==
Game play consists of a series of wars fought between the two players until one player completely conquers the map (or the other player concedes). A single war may be fought over an evening, but a "Campaign" of multiple wars can take several weeks to complete. Starting positions for each new war are determined by the outcome of the last war, modified by rules for events during peacetime. Each war consists of a sequence of turns with alternating player-turns, each consisting of multiple phases. Each turn represents a period of two years. The game includes an economic system in which the units on each side are produced and maintained. The Terran income is based on what type of world the player currently possesses, and whether it is connected by friendly jump paths to Sol. The Imperial income on the other hand has a fixed budget, but an increment for each connected outpost and world.

Each player turn begins with an economics phase. The player then performs movement and combat, followed by the opposing player's reaction movement and combat phase, and finally the second movement and combat phases. Then the other player repeats the same sequence and the turn ends. A "Glory Point" tally earned by the Imperium tracks who is having the upper hand in any given war. Points are gained for conquering worlds and lost for their conquest by the Terrans. A habitable world is worth four Glory Points and an outpost world is worth one. If at the end of a turn the Glory Point total has reached the amount necessary for victory, then the war is ended with the Imperium declaring victory. If the total drops sufficiently, the war instead ends with Terra declaring victory. The players thus do not get to choose how long to wage a particular war. The range between the amount required for Imperium or Terran victory begins to shrink after turn three, representing the decreasing appetite for continued hostilities.

Combat is somewhat abstracted, with the ships being lined up off map. All combat begins at long range. On subsequent combat rounds a die is rolled to see which player gets to determines combat range (long or short) with the smaller fleet gaining a bonus to their die roll. The defender places the ships down one at a time, and the attacker places a ship down to match. At the end, any left-over ships can be assigned to also fire on enemy vessels, or kept out of combat. The missile or beam factors of the firing ships are compared to the screen factors of the defenders, and a die roll determines if a ship has been destroyed. Several combat options are available, including firing all of a ship's missiles at once, or the so-called "suicide attack" where a ship maneuvers to point-blank range for a beam attack. Combat continues until one side is destroyed or until either player decides to disengage.

The game also includes abstracted rules for ground combat. Terran land units are green while Imperium units are black. In addition to regular land units and planetary defense units that can oppose a landing, there are special drop troops that can land on a planet without requiring a ship to transport them to the surface. If one side is all standard troops and the other side is all drop troops, the standard troops gain a bonus artillery attack against the drop troops to simulate the inability of the drop troops to carry a lot of heavy vehicles with them. The ground units have a single combat factor, plus a symbol and a unit identifier. Surface combat used a combat differential with the defense combat factor subtracted from the attacker's combat factor. A die is then rolled to determine whether the unit is destroyed.

The game system includes a random events table for various Imperium events. These can favor or hinder the Imperium player. There is also a system built into the game for production of new units, colonization, and other changes during the inter-war periods. Ships can age and be scrapped; the Emperor can grant or withdraw permission to build certain ship types, and territory can be exchanged.

== Reception ==
In the January–February 1978 edition of The Space Gamer (No. 15), Tony Watson gave the game a strong recommendation, saying, ""Imperium brings together many common themes of science fiction, and ties them to an excellent and intriguing game system which places both players in a unique situation with unique abilities to respond to that situation. Its ease of play makes it an enjoyable game. I predict it will be a classic."

In Issue 29 of the British wargaming magazine Perfidious Albion, Charles Vasey and Geoffrey Barnard discussed this game. Vasey commented, "I was agreeably surprised by this game, it really hangs together as a story. It present both sides with different targets. The constant effect of the action off the board keeps things hopping." Barnard replied, "In a way this game manages to cover well the whole range of combat, from tactical through strategic to galactic, including economics and certain political considerations." Vasey concluded, "A fine game ... man the laser beams and summon my flagship." Barnard concluded, " The game could go on for a very long time ... The game is therefore probably best played as a continuing saga, where you record the positions at the end of each war/peace cycle and start your next war from that point."

In Issue 84 of Campaign, Don Lowry noted the open-ended structure of the length of games, writing, "At the end of each game, a die is rolled to determine the length of the peace before the next war begins, repatriation of forces, territorial exchanges, interwar income, postwar production, interwar attrition, interwar production, interwar colonization and redistribution of forces."

In Issue 11 of The Wargamer, Hugh Baldwin liked the wide variety of options available to each player, writing, "A nice feature of the counter mix is the very wide variety of unit types for both the Terran and the Imperial player, ranging from Scouts, Destroyers, Missile Boats and four types of Cruisers ... to Dreadnoughts and Battleships, and including auxiliaries such as Transports and Tankers." Baldwin concluded, "The overall result is a clean, fast moving, but very convincing game."

In the September 1978 edition of Dragon (Issue 18), Dave Minch was ambivalent about the game. He liked the straightforward rules, saying, "It is a medium sized game of no great complexity which demands strategic attention and can be in doubt to the end. It is simple in many respects and has some excellent solutions to design problems which work well." However, Minch found the production values of the game components to be poor — the counters were too thin and not cut well, and the map contained errors. He also wanted more historical background to explain the setting of the game. Minch concluded, "Imperium has good points and bad, the good ahead by a slim margin. I think it’s worth your time since it shows a real regard for science fiction among the designers."

In the December 1979 -January 1980 edition of White Dwarf (Issue #16), Colin Reynolds gave the game a rating of 9 out of 10, saying, "The whole is extremely well produced, boxed, with a colourful map and large, clear counters and simple, clear-cut rules. Imperium is, without exception, the best game of its kind I have seen to date, and is a valuable addition to any gamer's library."

In the inaugural edition of Ares Magazine (March 1980), David Ritchie gave Imperium a better than average rating of 8 out of 9, saying, "This is either a serendipitous design or a cold-blooded development of a classic. Nicely conceived and beautifully executed. A moderately complex game, playable in a few hours.".

In the 1980 book The Complete Book of Wargames, game designer Jon Freeman called the game's presentation "flawless", and said of the game, "While not wildly original, the rationale is suitable and appealing." He noted that "At both the strategic and tactical levels, players have almost a surfeit of options." Freeman concluded by giving an Overall Evaluation of "Very Good", saying, "It's marvelous fun and challenging, too. Hard to beat."

The Wargamer reviewed 3rd Millennium, writing: "Those of us who played the GDW original will lament the trade-off of simplicity and elegance in favor of greater detail. Progress has its price, and while the results here might be mixed, the whole is greater than the sum of the parts."

In a retrospective review that appeared in Warning Order 33 years after the game's original publication, Matt Irsik called Imperium "still regarded as one of the best sci-fi games of all time." Irsik noted, "There are a dozen strategies about what to buy for your fleet and how they will be used, which gives this game good replay value." Irsik concluded, "Although this can be a long game and you can go through several wars, it is in my opinion, one of the best sci-fi based games out there and fun to play."

== Other reviews and commentary ==
- 1981 Games 100 in Games
- 1982 Games 100 in Games
- Strategy Plus
- Moves #37, p16-17
- Analog Science Fiction and Fact

== Foreign-language versions ==
- The second edition of the game was published in Swedish by Äventyrsspel under the name Empire (1990). The name change was to avoid possible confusion with Stjärnornas krig Imperium, another Äventyrsspel product released at the time, a module for their line of Swedish-language translations of WEG's Star Wars: The Roleplaying Game. This created the ironic situation that they switched from a title immediately understandable to Swedes to another foreign-language title much less so. (While "Imperium" is the Swedish word for "Empire", "Empire" is not a Swedish word).
- A German edition was produced in 1990 by Fantasy Productions
- there were also translations into Japanese, Chinese, and Portuguese
- The second edition of the game was published in Italian by StrateLibri (1992) under the name "Imperium - Imperi in lotta: Pianeti in Fiamme" [Imperium - Empire in Struggle: Planets in Flames].

== See also ==
- Galac-Tac
- Starweb
