= Snit's Revenge =

Board game

Snit's Revenge is a two-player board game developed and illustrated by Tom Wham. It originally appeared as an insert in Dragon Magazine in 1977, and subsequently as a boxed game first published by TSR, Inc. and currently by Steve Jackson Games. The Steve Jackson version comes boxed together with Snit Smashing, which was also first published in Dragon Magazine and to which Snit's Revenge is technically a sequel. The rules of this version differ slightly from those of the TSR version.

== Theme ==
Bolotomi are large essentially immobile creatures who live on an alien beach, and come to enjoy smashing tiny Snits when the latter creatures charge up out of the sea to reproduce. The Snits decide to seek revenge, and begin attacking the Bolotomi from within. Snit's Revenge depicts the ensuing internal battle, with one player controlling the invading tribe of Snits, the other manning the target Bolotomus's bodily defences.

== Rules ==
The Snits and the various types of body defenders are represented by cardboard chits, each of which features unique artwork. The pieces move across a gameboard which is a cross-section of a Bolotomus's body, consisting of various whimsically-named internal organs connected by narrow tubes which restrict that movement to varying degrees. Three of these organs have holes to the "outside", and it is through these that the Snits enter the board and begin the game. Each of the organs is considered "alive" when manned by a matching chit called a Snorg; the Snit player wins by successfully Kicking (via dice-roll) a certain percentage of Snorgs to death, or by finding "The Spark Of Life" chit, which is hidden by the Bolotomus player under a chosen Snorg at the start of the game, along with three explosive decoys. The Bolotomus wins if his Runnungitms, which are the rough equivalent of a human's white blood cells, can Chomp all the invading Snits to death (Again, the result of a dice roll.)

The exact number of Snit attackers varies from game to game, but the Snit player cannot replace his losses, while the Bolotomus has three "Compositor" organs where destroyed Snorgs can be resurrected and sent back to work, and a "Lapotum" inaccessible to Snits where new Runnungitms can be produced. If a Runnungitm successfully Chomps a Snit, it dies as well, and turns into a PoPo, which mindlessly floats towards the nearest exit and can possibly be used by either side to block movement between organs.

The game includes some optional rules, such as giving each Snit and/or Runnungitm unique attributes like battle speed or strength. (The Steve Jackson version of the game has made this concept standard, while turning the use of the Spark into an option.) There is also the possibility of including more than two players by breaking the Snits into competing tribes.

== Reviews ==
- Jeux & Stratégie #9
