= Gondor: The Siege of Minas Tirith =

1977 board wargame

Ziplock bag edition, cover art by Tim Kirk, 1977

Gondor, subtitled "The Siege of Minas Tirith S.R. 1419", is a licensed board wargame published by Simulations Publications, Inc. (SPI) in 1977 that simulates the Battle of Pelennor Fields from the fantasy novel The Lord of the Rings by J.R.R. Tolkien.

== Description ==
Gondor is a two-player wargame that deals with the siege of Minas Tirith as described in Tolkien's Return of the King, the last volume of The Lord of the Rings trilogy.

=== Components ===
The game, packaged in a ziplock bag or a folio, comes with

- 17" x 22" paper hex grid map of Minas Tirith and the surrounding plains
- 200 die-cut counters
- two 4-page rulebooks (one with rules common to both this game and SPI's Sauron, and the other with rules exclusive to this game)
- two charts

=== Gameplay ===
The forces of Sauron attack Minas Tirith, trying to conquer all seven levels of the city. The defenders, led by Gandalf, are outnumbered, and must hold on until reinforcements led by Aragorn and forces from Rohan can arrive.

=== Victory conditions ===
The forces of Sauron win by eliminating all Minas Tirith defenders inside the city, as well as defeating all arriving reinforcements. The defenders of the city win by preventing a victory by Sauron.

== Publication history ==
In 1976, SPI was granted a license by the Tolkien Estate to produce wargames based on The Lord of the Rings. SPI subsequently produced three wargames in 1977: War of the Ring, Sauron, and Gondor. The latter was a game designed by Rob Mosca, with graphics by Redmond A. Simonsen and cover art by Tim Kirk. SPI also packaged all three games into a boxed set titled Games of Middle Earth. This proved to be one of SPI's bestsellers, debuting at Number 1 on SPI's Top Ten list four months before publication based on pre-orders alone. Following its release in November 1977, Games of Middle Earth remained SPI's bestselling game for almost two years.

== Reception ==
In Issue 17 of The Space Gamer, David James Ritchie was disappointed in both Gondor and Sauron, writing, "They are adequate, but nothing more. Yet this lack of excellent is a cheat. Those who buy these games will do so because of the familiarity with the Tolkien mythos. They will expect the same impact from these games as was present in the books. They will not find the same degree of experience".

Writing for the Dutch games review site Casus Belli, Frank van den Bergh called both Sauron and Gondor "clearly lesser games" compared to War of the Ring. Although he admitted, "they are fun games that offer many possibilities," van den Bergh concluded, "These games are only recommended for the devoted Tolkien fan."

== Other reviews ==
- Moves #32, designers notes on p28
