= Middle Earth (board game) =

Series of epic fantasy board games

Cover art by Tim Kirk, 1977

Games of Middle Earth is a trilogy of board games published by Simulations Publications, Inc. in 1977 that are all based on the epic fantasy novel The Lord of the Rings by J. R. R. Tolkien. It was a bestseller for SPI even before its publication, and remained at or near the top of SPI's Top Ten list for two years.

== Description ==
The boxed set contains three games

1. War of the Ring: The first licensed product to attempt to cover the entire series of conflicts depicted in Lord of the Rings from the Fellowship's departure from Rivendell to the final battle at the Black Gates of Mordor. Designed by Howard Barasch and Richard Berg, with graphics by Redmond A. Simonsen and cover art by Tim Kirk.
2. Gondor: The Siege of Minas Tirith: A simulation of the siege of Minas Tirith as described in Tolkien's Return of the King, the last volume of The Lord of the Rings trilogy. Designed by Rob Mosca, with graphics by Redmond A. Simonsen and cover art by Tim Kirk.
3. Sauron: A simulation of the battle at the end of the Second Age between an army of monsters led Sauron and the Last Alliance of Elves and Men led by the heroes Elendil, Isildur and Gil-galad. Designed by Rob Mosca, with graphics by Redmond A. Simonsen and cover art by Tim Kirk.

=== Components ===
- three hex grid maps, one for each game
- a rule book for War of the Ring, a rule book of common rules for both Sauron and Gondor, and one rule book each for Sauron and Gondor that contain rules exclusive to each game
- die-cut counters for each game
- reference sheets for each game

== Publication history ==
In 1976, SPI was granted a license by the Tolkien Estate to produce wargames based on Lord of the Rings. It subsequently produced three wargames in 1977: War of the Ring, Sauron, and Gondor: The Siege of Minas Tirith. SPI also packaged all three games into a boxed set titled The Games of Middle Earth. This proved to be one of SPI's bestsellers, entering SPI's Top Ten list at Number 1 four months before publication based on pre-orders alone. Following its release in November 1977, Games of Middle Earth remained SPI's bestselling game for almost two years.

== Reception ==
In White Dwarf #11, Bill Seligman called this product "one of the most artistic games [SPI has] ever published, and one of the easiest to learn." But on the other side of the coin, "it is also one of the least balanced games they have ever put out." Overall, he found Middle Earth a bit disappointing, saying, "All in all, I'd say the game set Middle Earth is only fair. Tolkien deserves much better." He concluded by giving the set of games a rating of 5 out of 10.

Writing for the Dutch games review site Casus Belli, Frank van den Bergh liked War of the Ring, but called both Sauron and Gondor "clearly lesser games". Although he admitted, "they are fun games that offer many possibilities," van den Bergh concluded, "These games are only recommended for the devoted Tolkien fan."
