= Lords & Wizards =

Fantasy board game

Cover art of the boxed edition by Mike Gilbert

Lords & Wizards is a fantasy board wargame published by Fantasy Games Unlimited (FGU) in 1977.

== Description ==
Lords & Wizards is a wargame of world conquest for 2–12 players. Players control leaders who amass armies and magical items in a bid to eliminate their opponents. Leader units advance in levels after gaining experience.

=== Components ===
The game box or ziplock bag contains:

- 28" x 22" paper hex grid map sheet,
- 72-page typewritten rulebook
- 800 die-cut counters
- Time/Money card
- three cards of tables
- six-sided die

=== Setup ===
A Legend is dealt out to each city and ruin on the map. Each player decides which type of leader to start with, either a Lord or a Wizard, and must also choose an alignment for the leader (Good, Neutral or Chaotic). Each alignment has both a advantages and disadvantages. The starting place for each player is randomly determined, and the player may then discover what Legend belongs to that player's starting city, and whether the Legend may be of use.

=== Gameplay ===
Each player uses their leader to search for allies, henchmen, creatures and magic items in order to create the strongest force. A turn represents half a month, and each year consists of nine months. The game ends at the end of the third year (54 turns). Each unit has a movement rating, which can be affected by terrain. Combat is resolved using a standard Combat Result Table (CRT) and a die roll. Magic items that have been gained or bought can be used in combat. Lords gain a level of experience every three months (six turns). A Wizard gains a level after four turns spent studying.

=== Victory conditions ===
The game can end before its scheduled finish if one player eliminates all the other players. If the game lasts until the end of the third year, the player with the leader who has gained the most levels wins. If two or more leaders are tied for levels gained, the following become the tie-breaker in order of precedence: greatest Gold Talent income, most magical items of the same alignment; most current Gold Talents.

== Publication history ==
In the mid-1970s, shortly after the publication of Dungeons & Dragons, 16-year-old Adam Gruen designed a fantasy-themed Risk-like game for his friends by borrowing the components from two SPI wargames. He used the isopmorphic maps from Strategy I to produce a never-ending map, and the graphical counters from Dark Ages to represent Tolkienesque elves, dwarves, and monsters. Gruen sold the game to FGU, who published it in both a ziplock bag and as a boxed set in 1977 with cover and interior art by Mike Gilbert.

== Reception ==
In Issue 7 of White Dwarf, Fred Hemmings noted that there was a constant shortage of certain types of counters, and found the map was of "an unwieldy size." He also found parts of the rules to be "vague and contradictory," and some of the allies, Legends and magical items unbalanced the game. Hemmings concluded by giving the game a below-average rating of 6 out of 10, stating "it is clear that a lot of work has gone into the game. Given this it seems a pity that the sides are not more evenly balanced."

In the inaugural issue of Ares (March 1980), Greg Costikyan called the game "nothing so much as a fantasy Blitzkrieg", and noted that "strategic finesse is the major factor in determining the outcome of the game." He didn't like that the counters had no labels on them, meaning "one must infer their nature from the illustration on the counter, which results in frequent reference to the counter summary in the game rules." He concluded by giving the game a below-average rating of 5 out of 9, saying, "Lords & Wizards is a solid, competent design with no great innovation, and some graphics problems."

== Awards ==
At the 1978 Origins Awards, Lords & Wizards was a finalist for the Charles S. Roberts Award for "Best Fantasy Board Game of 1977."

== Other reviews and commentary ==
- Wyrm's Footnotes #4
