= Descent on Crete =

1978 WWII board wargame

- Designers: Eric Goldberg
- Illustrators: Redmond A. Simonsen
- Publishers: Simulations Publications Inc.
- Publication: 1978
- Genres: WWII

Descent on Crete is a board wargame published by Simulations Publications Inc. (SPI) in 1978 that simulates the German airborne invasion of Crete during World War II. A game with two large maps, hundreds of counters, and complex rules, Descent on Crete initially sold well, but sales rapidly declined.

== Background ==
In May 1941, German paratroopers invaded the island of Crete, defended by British forces. The first day of battle went well for the British, and they were confident that the invasion had been contained. But their failure to guard a key airfield allowed the Germans to capture it and fly in reinforcements and materiel, turning the battle in their favor.

== Description ==
Descent on Crete is a two-player board wargame in which one player controls the German invaders and the other player controls the British defenders. The rules system was taken from SPI's previous publication, Highway to the Reich. With 800 counters, two large 22" x 34" hex grid maps scaled at 640 m (700 yd) per hex, and a large number of rules, it is a complex game.

The game includes several short scenarios that cover smaller aspects of the overall battle, as well as one long 60-turn campaign game that covers the entire battle.

== Publication history ==
Descent on Crete was designed by Eric Goldberg, who admitted in his game notes that "the German landing sites and strengths do not correspond with the historical ones." Goldberg did this for two reasons: play balance, and to purposefully force several situations that occurred historically to re-occur in the game. The game was published by SPI as a boxed set in 1978 with graphic design by Redmond A. Simonsen, and initially sold well, rising to #6 on SPI's Bestseller List the month it was released. But it immediately fell off the list, and did not resurface.

== Reception ==
In Issue 29 of the British wargaming magazine Perfidious Albion, Geoffrey Barnard commented, "Descent on Crete will not be an easy game to play, even the short 6 to 10 turn scenarios will be hard work to complete."

In his 1980 book The Best of Board Wargaming, Nick Palmer compared Descent on Crete to the rival game Air Assault on Crete (Avalon Hill, 1977), and said, "The AH game is more fun, as the Germans have a fairly free hand in landing against hidden Allied dispositions — in the SPI version, both Allied positions and initial German landings are predetermined." However, Palmer's main objection to Descent on Crete was a reaction to designer Eric Goldberg's comments about the deliberate historical inaccuracies of the game for reasons of game balance, and to force historical situations to reoccur. Palmer objected, saying, "Both of these reasons are totally unacceptable and reduce wargaming to abstract counterpushing. If a situation is unbalanced, then the usual device of awarding victory to the player who improves on history [...] is preferable to artificial fiddling. [...] If the game is innaccurate or historical situations are unlikely to occur, then some important factor has been omitted."

In Issue 43 of Moves, Thomas Pratuch called the game "an excellent simulation of history, recreating the often confused and always intense fighting that occurred on the island." He did warn that due to its complexity and size, "this game is not to be recommended as a first purchase by a new gamer. It is an excellent simulation for the historian or experienced gamer who enjoys a difficult battle situation."

In The Guide to Simulations/Games for Education and Training, Martin Campion commented on the game's limited usefulness as an educational tool, saying, "This is a very interesting and intricate game but hopelessly big and complex for most classroom situations."

Craft, Model, and Hobby Industry Magazine also warned that the game "should be recommended for experienced players due to its size and complexity."

== Other reviews and commentary ==
- Moves #39
- Fire & Movement #60
- Strategy & Tactics #66
