= Michael Gilbert (artist) =

Fan artist and author

Michael 'Mike' Gilbert (20 July 1947 – 14 August 2000) was a prolific U.S. fan artist in the late ’60s in Locus and other fanzines as well as an author, and publishing professional. Later he did illustrations for Fantasy Games Unlimited, Analog, F&SF, etc., and served as art director for If. He died August 14, 2000 of complications following open-heart surgery. He graduated from Rochester Institute of Technology in 1970. He married Sheila Gilbert, née Elkin, in 1971.

Gilbert won the Hugo Award for Best Fan Artist in 1971.

== Bibliography ==
=== Chapterbooks ===
- The Day of the Ness (1975) with Andre Norton

=== Cover art ===
- Victory on Janus (1968)
- Locus, June 24, 1969
- Locus, July 31, 1969
- Locus, August 23, 1969
- Locus, September 10, 1969
- Locus, December 31, 1969
- The Magazine of Fantasy and Science Fiction, February 1970
- If, March 1970
- Locus, April 9, 1970
- Locus, May 22, 1970
- Locus, October 20, 1970
- Locus, May 25, 1971
- Locus, January 22, 1972
- Breaking Point (1973)
- Analog Science Fiction/Science Fact, December 1974]
- The New SF Bulletin Index to SF Books 1974
- The Day of the Ness (1975)
- The Day of the Ness (1976)
- The Scream Factory #19, Summer 1997

=== Interior Art ===
- Pierheads in Space (1968)
- Cartoon: "Looks like another 'New Wave'" (1969)
- Locus #26 (1969)
- Locus #45 (1969)
- Locus #70 (1970)
- The Secret of the Time Vault (1971)
- The Habitat Manager (1971)
- Letter from an Unknown Genius (1971)
- A Little Knowledge (1971)
- Unfair Trade (1972)
- How to Design a Flying Saucer (1972)
- Lupoff's Book Week (1973)
- On Mars With Mike Gilbert (1974)
- Encounter Below Tharsis (1974)
- The Day of the Ness (1975)
- Blessing in Disguise (1976)
- "And Then There Were Nine . . ." (1977)
- The Last Battalion (1977)
- Trumpet #12 (1981)
- Cartoon: "Why Not to Use Electrical Outlets in Dungeons" (1986)
- Love of Life (1986)
- Empire's Horizon (map) (1989)
- The Last of the Renshai (map) (1992)
- Child of Thunder (Map) (1993)
- The Legend of Nightfall (map) (1993)
- Turning Point (map) (1993)
- The Glass Dragon (map) (1994)
- Profiteer (maps) (1995)
- Partisan (map) (1995)
- Fire Margins (maps) (1996)
- To Sheila E. Gilbert (1997)
- King's Dragon (map) (1997)
- The Dragon's Touchstone (map) (1997)
- The Broken Crown (Map) (1997)
- Razor's Edge (maps) (1997)
- The Uncrowned King (map) (1998)
- Sunderlies Seeking (map) (1998)
- Prince of Dogs (map) (1999)
- Dark Nadir (maps) (1999)
- Guardian of the Balance (map) (1999)
- Guardian of the Trust (map) (2000)
- Stronghold Rising (map / diagram) (2000)
- The Burning Stone (map) (2000)
- The Wizard's Treasure (Interior Montastery Map) (2000)
- Between Darkness and Light (map / diagrams) (2003)
- The Gathering Storm (map) (2003)
- The Riven Shield (map) (2003)
- The Hostile Takeover Trilogy (maps) (2004)
- Cartoon (Reap the Wild Wind) (2007)
- Map of Sholan Alliance and Valtegan Empire (Shades of Gray) (2010)
- Shades of Gray (drawings) (2010)
- The Stone Prince (map) (unknown)

=== Shortfiction ===
- The Happy Brotherhood (1985)
- The General's Bane (2000) with Sheila E. Gilbert

=== Essays ===
- Letter (The Alien Critic #9) (1974)
- On Mars With Mike Gilbert (1974)
- Letter (Science Fiction Review #14) (1975)
- Letter (Science Fiction Review #20) (1977)
- Letter (Science Fiction Review #22) (1977)
- Sabers, Lasers and Starships: An Introduction and Review of Science Fiction and Fantasy Wargaming (1979)
- Sabers, Lasers and Starships: An Introduction and Review of Science Fiction and Fantasy Wargaming, Part Two (1979)

=== Role Playing Games ===
- Royal Armies of the Hyborean Age (1975), illustrator.
- Bunnies & Burrows (1976), illustrator.
- Citadel (1976), illustrator.
- Archworld (1977), co-author with Sheila Gilbert & illustrator.
- Down Styphon! (1977), co-author & illustrator.
- The Blue-Light Manual (1977), illustrator.
- Broadsword (1977), illustrator.
- Chivalry & Sorcery (1977), illustrator.
- Chivalry & Sorcery Sourcebook (1978), illustrator.
- Swords & Sorcerers (1978), illustrator.
- Towers for Tyrants (1978), author & illustrator.
- Saurians (1979), illustrator.
- Privateers & Gentlemen (1982), illustrator.
