= M 1-42 =

Planetary nebula in the constellation of Sagittarius

Emission nebula
- Planetary nebula
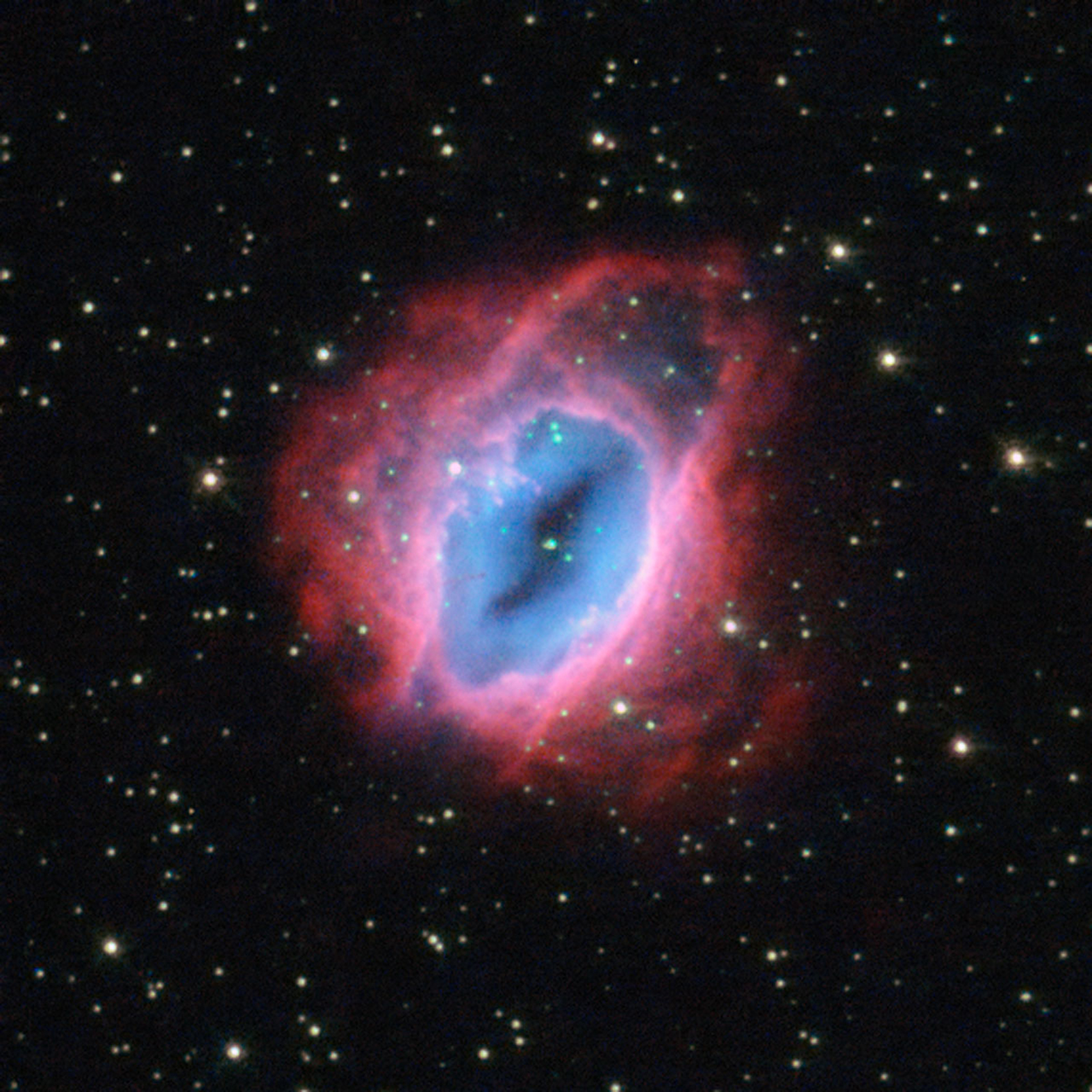
- Planetary nebula M 1-42

Observation data: J2000 epoch
- Right ascension: 18^{h} 11^{m} 05.028^{s}
- Declination: −28° 58′ 59.33″
- Distance: 10 000 ly
- Constellation: Sagittarius
- Designations: PK 002-04 2, PN VV' 357, WRAY 16-380, GSC2 S301212227655, PN G002.7-04.8, PN M 1-42, [DSH99] 456-4, Hen 2-359, PN Sa 2-305, PN VV 153, IRAS 18079-2859, PN StWr 2-8, SCM 187

M 1-42 is a planetary nebula located in the constellation of Sagittarius, 10 000 light-years away from Earth.

== Nickname ==
The nebula has been nicknamed the "Eye of Sauron Nebula" due to its resemblance to the Lord of the Rings film artifact.
