= The Warlord Game =

1977 board game

The Warlord Game is a 1977 board game published by Robert Williams Games.

== Gameplay ==
The Warlord Game is a fantasy role-playing board game about gaining power in medieval Europe.

== Reception ==
David James Ritchie reviewed The Warlord Game in The Space Gamer No. 16. Ritchie commented that "As history of even the flavor-of-the-era variety, it is something of a bust; as a role-playing vehicle, it is tremendous."

Don Turnbull reviewed The Warlord Game for White Dwarf #7, and stated that "This is quite an attractive game and could be fun with 4 players or more, though rather dull with two."

== Reviews ==
- The Guide to simulations/games for education and training
- Strategy & Tactics #66
