= The Emerald Tablet (board game) =

1977 fantasy miniatures ruleset

The Emerald Tablet is a set of fantasy miniatures rules published in 1977 by Creative Wargames Workshop.

== Gameplay ==
The Emerald Tablet sets out rules for using fantasy miniatures in combat, including selecting and building an army similar to one that would have been extant before the Thirty Years War, and rules for battle magic.

The rules for combat and movement are similar to other fantasy miniatures combat rule systems such as Chainmail, but the rules for magic are based on historic demonology and rituals. Magic spells are divided between the innate magic that a spellcaster can call forth without aid, such as levitation or invisibility; and magic which requires the assistance of a creature from another plane, be that angel, demon or some other spirit.

== Reception ==
In the September 1978 edition of Dragon (Issue 18), Dave Minch found the combat and movement rules fairly derivative, but thought the historically-based magic rules set The Emerald Tablet apart from all miniatures combat rules that had gone before. "This is the most developed and 'realistic' set of rules for magic I have ever seen. They are readily adaptable to any fantasy campaign and, I think, they are better suited to them." Minch concluded with a strong recommendation, saying, "The design team for these rules did the kind of research which should have gone into most others. The magic rules are worth the price of the book. I recommend them to anyone who knows something about Medieval magic and wants to bring that into wargaming."

In the March 1981 edition of The Space Gamer (No. 37), Glenn Williams was unimpressed with the complex rules, and felt that only certain gamers should buy it. "By itself, The Emerald Tablet is too complicated and requires too much effort to be enjoyed by any but the most hardcore gamer. However, given the main competition, TSR's Swords and Spells and Chainmail, The Emerald Tablet is clearly superior. If you want a game that can show what magic was like under the tutelage of Albertus Magnus or with the Key of Solomon, this is your game. If that's not what you want, stay well away."
