= CirKis =

Board game

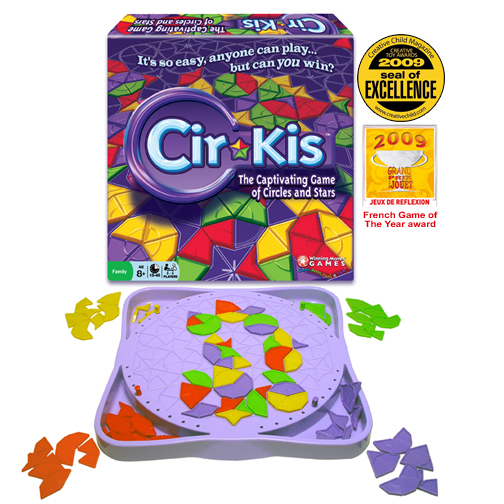
- Product Display
- Designers: Phil E. Orbanes
- Publishers: Winning Moves Games USA; Winning Moves France; Winning Moves Germany; Winning Moves UK; Hasbro
- Players: 2 to 4
- Playing time: 15-25 minutes
- Age range: 8 and up

CirKis is a piece placing board game, for two to four players, invented by Phil E. Orbanes and developed by Winning Moves Games USA in 2008. However, the game is no longer in production. The game is based on a Penrose tiling.

== Gameplay ==
The game is played on a decagonal board, which contains the scoring pegs, and has a storage well for each of the four coloured sets of pieces. There are 80 total pieces divided into four identical sets of purple, red, green and yellow.

Cirkis board (left) and pieces

The first player must place a piece inside, or touching, the center circle. Then, every piece played must touch the piece previously placed on the board. So, on a player's turn, they must place a piece so it touches the piece that was just played by the previous player.

Players score points by completing circles and stars. If a player has majority of the five segments in the circle or star, they scores 10 points. A five point bonus is awarded to the player who completes the shape if they do not have majority in the shape.

A player can earn a free turn – play anywhere, in three ways:

1. If they complete the centre star
2. If they are the first player to use their silver piece
3. If they place a piece that is completely surrounded and there is no adjacent spot for the other players to play.

== Strategy ==
- Each player has the same exact pieces. There are large pieces that cover three segments of a circle. If a player has the chance to play these, they have immediate majority and will score 10 points when the shape is completed. There are no pieces covering three segments in a star.
- The smaller pieces like the arrow and wedge will come in very handy later in the game when trying to navigate out of tight spots.
- Free turns can be very valuable, but if the game results in a tie, the winner is the player with the greatest number of pieces remaining. This means that it took fewer moves for that player to reach 40 points.
