= Skirrid (board game) =

Skirrid is a board game designed for 2–6 players.

== Description ==
It is played on a 19×19 square board which is divided into two areas: a central diamond (coloured white) and the four corner triangles (coloured black) that remain. One player has 18 translucent tiles made of clear plastic, the other of smoked plastic. These tiles come in six different shapes, each with their own name:

- The Eye (covers 1 square);
- The Rod (covers 2 squares);
- The Quoin (covers 3 squares);
- The Snake (covers 4 squares);
- The Door (covers 5 squares);
- The Gun (covers 6 squares).

== Television advert ==
Arthur Mullard starred in the games 1980 television advert.

== Two-player game ==
White begins by placing any of their tiles across the centre square. The players then take turns placing their pieces on the board, which is covered with numbers. Players must play within the white squares until they have achieved a score of 75 or more. The aim is to get as high a score as possible. Of the three pieces of each variety, one has an inscribed '2' above one square, and one has an inscribed '3' (the other is unmarked). When these pieces are played, the square on the board covered by the number written on the tile is multiplied by that number when it is added to the relevant player's score. Pieces may only be placed in positions where they are adjacent to (not just diagonally touching) a piece of either colour that has already been placed. The game ends when all 36 pieces have been placed on the board, and the highest score wins.

A player may block their opponent by placing a shape upside down. For the next turn only, the other player may not play adjacent to this blocking piece (but is permitted to touch it diagonally). The blocking shape scores half its normal total, rounding down if necessary.

== Reviews ==
- Games #14
- Jeux & Stratégie #6
- The Courier-Journal
