= Musket & Pike =

Board wargame

Musket & Pike, subtitled "Tactical Combat, 1550-1680", is a board wargame published by Simulations Publications Inc. (SPI) in 1973 that simulates combat in Europe during the transition from edged weapons to firearms in the 16th and 17th centuries.

== Background ==
During the English Civil War, the French War of the Three Henrys, the Dutch Revolt and the Thirty Years' War of the 16th and 17th centuries, battle tactics in Europe were forced to adapt as weaponry moved from the medieval pike to the single shot musket and pistol.

== Description ==
Musket & Pike is a two-player board wargame that examines the tactics needed during historical battles during the period when pikemen were still an important part of an army but as reasonably reliable single-person firearms came to the fore.

=== Components ===
The game box contains:

- 22" x 29" paper hex grid map scaled at 50 m (55 yd) per hex
- 400 die-cut counters
- map-folded rulesheet
- various player aids and charts
- small 6-sided die

=== Gameplay ===
The game uses an alternating "I Go, You Go" system. The first player

- Fires
- Moves
- Engages in melee combat

The second player is given the same opportunity. This complete one full game turn and represents 5 minutes of game time.

After familiarizing themselves with the basic rules, the players can use several optional rules including advanced road movement, infantry squares, cavalry dismounts and capturing artillery.

=== Scenarios ===
There are a total of 18 scenarios representing historical battles:

- Mookerheyde (14 April 1574)
- Coutras (20 October 1587)
- Nieuwpoort (2 July 1600)
- White Mountain (8 November 1620)
- Fleurus (29 August 1622)
- Breitenfeld (17 September 1631)
- Lützen (16 November 1632)
- Nördlingen (6 September 1634)
- Dunkirk Dunes (3 June 1658)
- Brentford (12 November 1642)
- Grantham (13 May 1643)
- Staverton (4 July 1643)
- Marston Moor (1 July 1644)
- Aberdeen (15 September 1644)
- Naseby (14 June 1645)
- Dunbar (3 September 1650)
- Szentgotthard (1 August 1664)
- Killiecrankie (27 July 1689)

== Publication history ==
Musket & Pike was designed by John Young, and was published by SPI in 1973 with graphic design by Redmond A. Simonsen. It was originally packaged in a plain white box with a red title ribbon. In 1974, SPI developed their "flatpack" box, and Musket & Pike was re-released in the new-style box with cover art by Manfred Milkuhn.

In a 1976 poll conducted by SPI to determine the most popular board wargames in North America, Musket & Pike, despite having been published four years before, scored very highly, placing 33rd out of 202 games.

== Reception ==
In the 1977 book The Comprehensive Guide to Board Wargaming, Nicholas Palmer commented that the game "deals with 1550–1680, with firearms turning warfare into a quite different affair from the Agincourt era, but before cannon had completed the transformation." Palmer concluded "One of the most popular of the tactical period games."

In Issue 11 of Moves, Martin Campion noted that "It was a period of great confusion in tactics because of the incompatibility of the two main infantry weapons, the musket and the pike. [...] This dilemma is neatly reflected in the stacking and other rules of this game. You can mix the two kinds of units this way, but no matter what you do it will be wrong." He concluded, "The game is smooth and simple to operate, the map is not overly cluttered with terrain [...] it is a fine and valuable interpretation of the warfare of the period."

In Issue 21 of the UK wargaming magazine Phoenix, Donald Mack found that the required mixture of pikemen and musketeers forced players to use tactical formations that were historically accurate, saying, "the player who does not will find his pike units disrupted by fire and his unprotected muskets overwhelmed by pikemen or swept away by cavalry; thus he will move (or be kicked) towards Tactics of the Time." Mack concluded, "the general success of the game system and its retention of simplicity make it a success within the limits set by the designer."

In The Guide to Simulations/Games for Education and Training, Martin Campion commented on this game as an educational aid, saying, "I have used Musket & Pike in my class, 'War in Western Civilization', playing it with somewhat altered rules as a simultaneous movement game. Played ordinarily it gives a fair representation of the tactical problems of the time although the game mechanics are too abstract."

In the 1980 book The Complete Book of Wargames, game designer Jon Freeman commented that "This is a good — if somewhat outmoded — game. It is easy to play, and most of the scenarios are fun." Freeman gave this game an Overall Evaluation of "Good", concluding, "While it is not exactly state-of-the-art, nothing has been done to take its place, and it's worth looking into."

== Other reviews and commentary ==
- Panzerfaust #62
- Strategy & Tactics #43
- The Wargamer Vol.1 #4 & #17
- Phoenix #12
