= Sauron (game) =

1977 board wargame

Cover of folio edition, art by Tim Kirk (1977)

Sauron, subtitled "The Battle for the Ring, S.A. 3434", is a licensed board wargame published by Simulations Publications, Inc. (SPI) in 1977 that simulates the battle between Sauron and the Last Alliance of Elves and Men mentioned in the fantasy novel The Lord of the Rings by J.R.R. Tolkien.

== Description ==
Sauron is a two-player wargame that deals with the battle as the Second Age ended between an army of monsters led by Sauron, and the Last Alliance led by the heroes Elendil, Isildur and Gil-galad.

=== Components ===
The game, packaged in a ziplock bag or a folio, comes with

- 17" x 22" paper hex grid map of Minas Tirith and the surrounding plains
- 100 die-cut counters
- two 4-page rulebooks (one with rules common to both this game and SPI's Gondor: The Siege of Minas Tirith, and the other with rules exclusive to this game)
- two charts

=== Gameplay ===
Both forces meet on the Plains of Dagorlad, and engage in combat using alternate turns. The winner is the player who completely destroys the other army.

== Publication history ==
In 1976, SPI was granted a license by the Tolkien Estate to produce wargames based on The Lord of the Rings. SPI subsequently produced three wargames in 1977: War of the Ring, Gondor, and Sauron. The latter was a game designed by Rob Mosca, with graphics by Redmond A. Simonsen and cover art by Tim Kirk. SPI also packaged all three games into a boxed set titled Games of Middle Earth. This proved to be one of SPI's bestsellers, debuting at Number 1 on SPI's Top Ten list four months before publication based on pre-orders alone. Following its release in November 1977, Games of Middle Earth remained SPI's bestselling game for almost two years.

== Reception ==
In Issue 17 of The Space Gamer, David James Ritchie was disappointed in both Gondor and Sauron, writing, "They are adequate, but nothing more. Yet this lack of excellent is a cheat. Those who buy these games will do so because of the familiarity with the Tolkien mythos. They will expect the same impact from these games as was present in the books. They will not find the same degree of experience".

Writing for the Dutch games review site Casus Belli, Frank van den Bergh called both Sauron and Gondor "clearly lesser games" compared to War of the Ring. Although he admitted, "they are fun games that offer many possibilities," van den Bergh concluded, "These games are only recommended for the devoted Tolkien fan."

In Issue 16 of Phoenix, Ed Merryweather found that the use of sorcery by the Dark Forces allowed the game to stay balanced, saying "this is what gives the game its sheer superbness in my eyes." He concluded that the game was "a good pitched battle, balanced and lots of fun."
