= Quazar (board game) =

Board game

Quazar is a 1977 board wargame published by Excalibre Games.

== Gameplay ==
Quazar is a science fiction simulation game for two or more players.

== Reception ==
W. G. Armintrout reviewed Quazar in The Space Gamer No. 23. Armintrout commented that "after this discouraging trip into sadness and despair, what can I say about Quazar? The rules are poor, incomplete, and contradictory. The game is ill-conceived, and too large for normal play. Players who want to play this wargame will need to write their own rules to replace or supplement the ones which come with the game."

David Ritchie reviewed Quazar in Ares Magazine #1, rating it a 2 out of 9. Ritchie commented that "The most innovative element in the design is the random appearance of secret weapons for both sides. The rational is not quite as logical as, let's say, a Marvel Comics plot, but if you bought this gobbler because of the cover, you shouldn't expect better."
