= Hexagony =

Board game

Hexagony is an abstract strategy board game for 2 to 6 players that was published as Bin'Fa by Taoist Arts Inc. in 1977, as Hexagony by Avalon Hill in 1980, and later re-released in a slightly modified form by Kenterprises as Bin'Fa.

== Gameplay ==
=== Components ===
- a map: a large hexagon divided into six differently colored equilateral triangles, each of which is further divided into sixteen smaller equilateral triangles.
- six sets of 12 tokens
- six supply track tokens
- 12 black plastic sticks
- 60 supply tokens
- two six-sided dice

=== Set-up ===
1. Each player chooses which color of army and home territory they wish to play and places their supply track token on their starting circle of the supply track.
2. One player places one of the black plastic rods on the side of a space in their home territory. The next player does the same, and this continues until there are no sticks left.
3. Each player places all twelve of their tokens anywhere in their "home" territory. Players can create stacks of either two or three tokens, and normally do not leave single tokens, since singletons have neither offensive nor defensive capabilities.
4. Finally each player rolls one die and takes that number of supply chits to start the game.

=== Play ===
On a player's turn, the player can choose to either seek supplies, or to move pieces.

=== Supplies ===
The supply track consists of a track of colored circles that runs around the perimeter of the board. A player who chooses to spend their turn seeking supplies rolls 2 dice and moves their supply track marker the number of squares equal to either one or both of the dice. There is no cost for this.

In Avalon Hill's edition, if the supply track token lands on the player's own color, the player gains a number of supply chits equal to the number of spaces moved. If the player's supply track token lands on a space with an opposing player's army symbol, the active player can choose to take supply chits from the bank or from the opposing player. Once supplies have been gained, the player can choose to end their turn, or may continue to attempt to gain supplies as many times as desired, but if the player rolls doubles (the same number on both dice), the player's turn is over and the player loses all supplies gained during the turn. For example, the red player rolls a 3 and a 4, and chooses the 4 since that will land their supply track token on red, gaining the player 4 supply chits. The player decides to try again, and rolls a 1 and a 3. The player chooses the 1 since that will land on red again, gaining one more supply chit. The player tries one more time and rolls double sixes. The player's turn immediately ends, and the player loses all five supply chits earned during the turn.

In Kenterprise's version, the rule has been added that if a player's supply track token lands on an opponent's color, and the active player has at least one token in that player's territory, the player can choose to take supply chits from either the bank or the opposing player.

=== Movement ===
In the Avalon Hill edition of the game, to move tokens, the player pays one supply chit and rolls two dice, choosing one of the dice. The player can then move tokens such that the number of tokens and the number of spaces moved equals the number rolled. For example, if the player rolls a 2 and a 4 and chooses the 4, the player can move one token four spaces, or two tokens two spaces each, or four tokens one space each. The player can voluntarily end the turn anytime, or can choose to continue rolling the dice and moving tokens as many times as desired. If the player runs out of supply chits or rolls doubles, the player's turn ends.

In the Kenterprises edition of the game, the player rolls two dice, and can move one entire stack the difference between the two dice. So if the player rolls a 2 and a 4 (a difference of two), the player can move one stack 2 spaces. All other aspects of movement, including supply payment and ending a turn upon rolling doubles, remains the same.

=== Dislodging ===
If a player moves a stack of tokens into a space adjacent to an opponent's smaller stack of tokens, the active player can attempt to dislodge the smaller stack out of that space by rolling two dice. If either die comes up as "6", the opposing player must retreat one space, and the active player moves their stack into the disputed space. If the active player rolls a double six, the defender must retreat two spaces. If the defender is unable to retreat to an empty space, the defending tokens are removed from play.

=== Surrounding ===
If a player can maneuver their pieces so that an opposing stack is surrounded on all three sides by stacks that are at least as large as the defender's, then the defender's pieces are removed from play. If a player is reduced to three tokens or less, they are out of the game.

=== Optional rules ===
There are a number of optional rules that can be used including unlimited stacking, movement variants and a "nuclear explosion" option.

=== Victory condition ===
The last player to survive is the winner.

== Publication history ==
In the mid-1970s, Ken Hodkinson designed an abstract strategy game he called Bin'Fa, and set up Taoist Arts Inc. to publish it in 1977. Wishing to have a wider distribution, Hodkinson sent the game to Avalon Hill to try to get it published. Alan Moon had just started work at Avalon Hill as a game developer, and thought Bin'Fa showed promise. He modified some of the rules, renamed it Hexagony, and it was released by Avalon Hill in 1980.

Ken Hodkinson later re-acquired the rights to the game, and under the company name Kenterprises, republished the game in its original form, using the title Bin'Fa: The Tao of War. In 2015, Hodkinson released a completely revised edition of Bin'Fa that features new rules, and a new map board.

== Reception ==
In the November 1980 edition of The Space Gamer (No. 33), Stephen Taylor was impressed by the Avalon Hill version of Hexagony, saying, "I highly recommend this game. It is easy to learn but still challenging and enjoyable to play. It's a great game to have on hand if time is limited and you're not sure how many people are playing."

Herb Levy reviewed the Kenterprises edition of Bin'Fa for Gamers Alliance, and found much to like, including the "attractive presentation". He thought the rulebook was very complete, and called the question and answer format "easy to read and understand." He noted that the changing position of the walls in each game meant that each game was a fresh tactical challenge. And he admired the "yin-yang" of the oppositional choices of needing supplies to move versus not moving in order to gain supplies. He also found the stoppage of play after rolling doubles "adds a heightened sense of tension and excitement to play." However, he noted that the game does require a lot of dice rolling, and much of the game is based on luck. rather than strategy and tactics. He concluded that this game "does combine elements into a pleasing package of movement strategies, supply considerations and pressing your luck (with a hefty dose of dice rolling) that make the game well worthy of attention."

In 2002, Mitch Tomashow reviewed the Kenterprises edition of Bin'Fa for The Games Journal, and found that "Bin'Fa is filled with agonizing decisions and choices, and you are always balancing patience and urgency". He further noted that "it is both game and philosophy, in the same way that any great game is. That is, you learn a lot about yourself as you self-reflect on your participation in the game." However, Tomashow did add the caveat that "Bin'Fa is decidedly abstract [...] there is virtually no dressing here, other than the Oriental milieu. If you can't deal with such an abstract design, you may not enjoy Bin'Fa." He concluded with a strong recommendation, saying, "The game is just great fun to play. The varied terrain, the die-rolling, the different ways to play, the interesting strategic choices, keep Bin'Fa fresh, original and entertaining."

In 2005, Caleb Diffell reviewed the Avalon Hill edition of Hexagony for The Games Journal, and found that it was "a combination of chance and skill that I find quite refreshing and indeed, quite challenging." However, he didn't like the design of the board, in which the two halves merely sat beside each other without being joined, so if they were moved, playing pieces could fall in between the two halves. He also noted that the "totally useless" counter tray only had four compartments, although there are six colours of tokens and another sixty supply chits. He commented that, "All in all, the production quality is really not up to Avalon Hill standard." Nonetheless, Diffell concluded by giving the game an above average overall score 8 out of 10, saying, "this is a great game that everyone should try if they can find it."

== Reviews ==
- Games
- 1981 Games 100 in Games
- 1982 Games 100 in Games
- Games & Puzzles #80
