= Professional Wrestling (role-playing game) =

Tabletop role-playing game

Professional Wrestling is a 1977 role-playing game published by Off the Wall Games.

== Gameplay ==
Professional Wrestling is a set of rules for two or more players that allow them to use wrestling maneuvers on their opponents.

== Reception ==
Tom Gordon reviewed Professional Wrestling in The Space Gamer No. 33. Gordon commented that "I would recommend this game to anyone who wants a change of pace. It provides real fun and is worth [the price]."
