= Tim Kirk =

American fantasy and science fiction artist

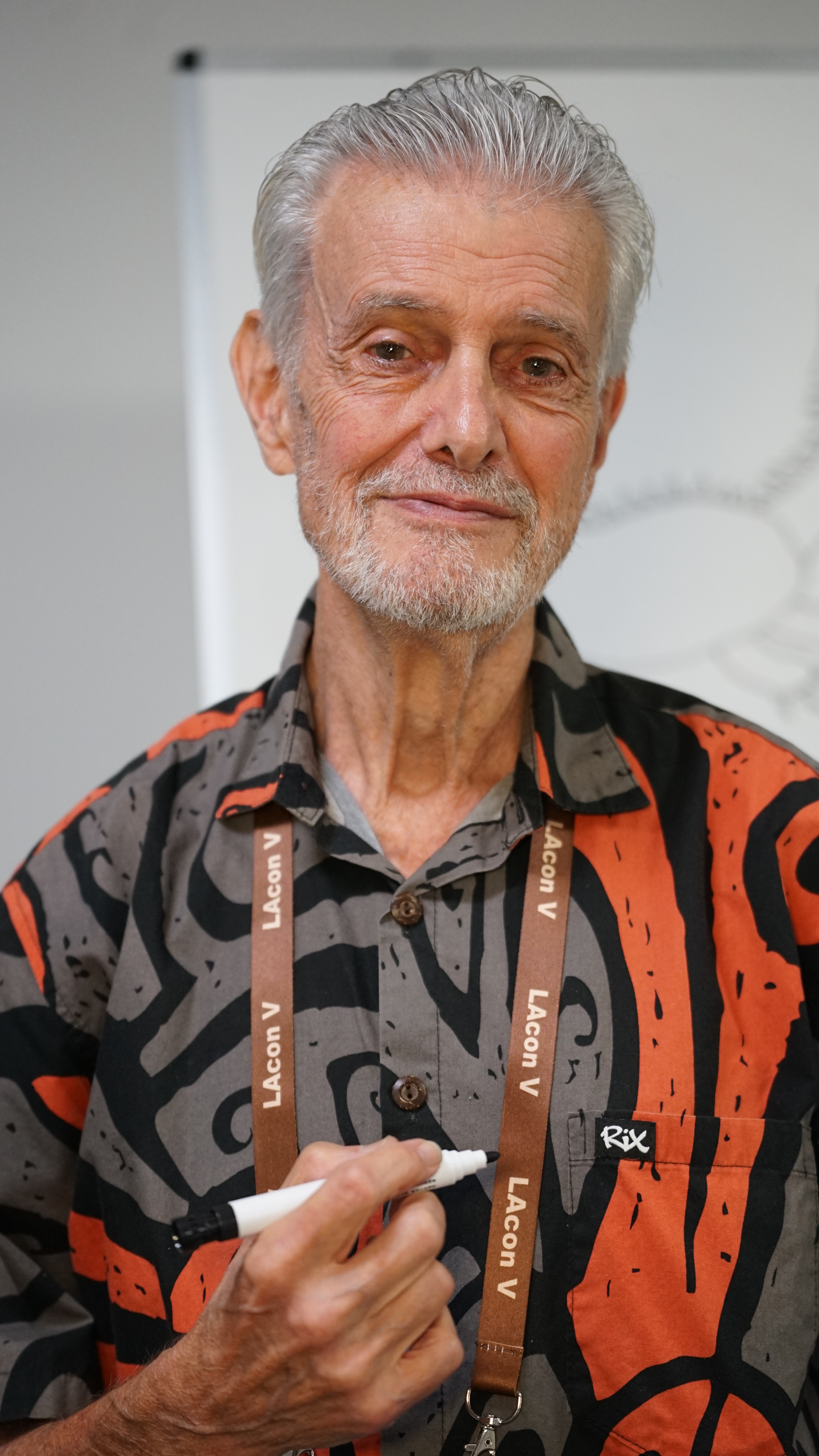
- Kirk at Worldcon 2026
- Born: October 30, 1947 (age 78); Long Beach, California, United States
- Education: California State University, Long Beach
- Known for: Painting, drawing
- Movement: Fantasy art
- Awards: Art awards
- Website: www.kirkdesigninc.com

Tim Kirk (born October 30, 1947) is both a professional artist and an American fan artist. He worked as a senior designer at Tokyo DisneySea, as an Imagineer for the Walt Disney company.

== Career ==
Tim Kirk was born October 30, 1947, in Long Beach, California.

Kirk became a fan of science fiction while attending California State University, Long Beach. While earning his bachelor's degree in fine arts, his artwork began appearing in fanzines. He was nominated nine time for the Hugo Award for Best Fan Artist, winning five times 1970 to 1976. He turned professional in the early 1970s, doing book covers for Mirage Press and DAW Books. He earned his master's degree in illustration from CSU-Long Beach in 1973. His master's thesis consisted of paintings inspired by J. R. R. Tolkien's The Lord of the Rings. Ballantine Books purchased several of the paintings, using most of them for the 1975 Tolkien Calendar and one of them as the cover for the Ballantine edition of Robert Foster's The Complete Guide to Middle-earth. Tim Kirk's Tolkien-inspired art also appears in the War of the Ring (SPI game) boardgame published by Simulations Publications, Inc. in 1977.

Kirk's artwork had a childlike quality that found few buyers in the science fiction and fantasy field at the time, so he took a job in 1973 as an illustrator for Hallmark Cards and then Current Inc., drawing cute animals for greeting cards, box covers, and wrapping paper.

Kirk joined Walt Disney Productions in 1980 as an illustrator, designer, and "Imagineer", playing an especially important role in the creation of the theme park DisneySea in Japan.

He co-designed the Typhoon Lagoon water park with his brother, Steve Kirk, and Imagineers Raellen Lescault, Chris Runco, Julie Svendsen, and others. He sketched out the "waterskiing alligator" logo for Disney's Blizzard Beach, which helped convince Disney CEO Michael Eisner to go with a winter sports theme, rather than alternative like a "dinosaur dig" or "Mayan temple". He also designed parts of the Great Movie Ride, Tower of Terror, Indiana Jones Stunt Spectacular, and Muppet*Vision 3D.

Kirk is retired from his design firm, Kirk Design, Inc., located in the Los Angeles, California area. He also sits on the advisory board of Seattle's Science Fiction Museum and Hall of Fame.

== Hugo Awards ==
Kirk won the Hugo Award for Best Fan Artist in 1970, 1972, 1973, 1974, and in 1976. With Ken Keller, he co-designed the first cold-cast resin base used for a Hugo, given in 1976 by the World Science Fiction Society at Kansas City's 34th World Science Fiction Convention; he has been additionally nominated other times for the award.
